= Saint-Germain – Boucles de Seine bus network =

Public bus network in France

Saint-Germain – Boucles de Seine
- Parent: Île-de-France Mobilités
- Founded: August 1, 2022
- Service area: Yvelines: (Aigremont, Chambourcy, Le Chesnay-Rocquencourt, L'Étang-la-Ville, Louveciennes, Mareil-Marly, Le Pecq, Poissy, Le Port-Marly, Saint-Germain-en-Laye, Le Vésinet); Hauts-de-Seine: (Courbevoie, Puteaux)
- Routes: 6301 6302 6304 6305 6306; 6307 6308 6309 6311 6312; 6315 6321 6350 6351 7824; 7826
- Operator: Keolis (Keolis Argenteuil Boucles de Seine)

Saint-Germain – Boucles de Seine is a French bus network run by Île-de-France Mobilités and the communauté d'agglomération Saint Germain Boucles de Seine, operated by Transdev through his subsidiary Transdev Boucle des Lys from August 1, 2022.

It consists of 16 lines serving the Communauté d'agglomération Saint Germain Boucles de Seine. The network is also completed with a night line, a demand-responsive transport and the Noctilien line N153.

== History ==
Before the opening to the competition of transports in Île-de-France, the bus lines were integrated to these networks: CTCOP, Entre Seine et Forêt, Poissy Aval - Deux Rives de Seine, Résalys and Transdev Montesson Les Rabaux.

=== Network development ===
==== Development of lines operated by CTCOP ====
Before the opening to the competition, the line Express A14 was operated by the CTCOP (Compagnie des transports collectifs de l'ouest parisien), this line have many services from La Défense – Terminal Jules Verne.

However, the line A14 were split into many lines and were transferred to Mantois and Poissy – Les Mureaux, excepting the line A14 Chambourcy.

===== Lines transferred to Mantois =====
- Mantes-la-Jolie – Hôpital François Quesnay: A14 Mantes (future line 7820)
- Bonnières-sur-Seine – Vallée française: A14 Bonnières (future line 7823)
- Gare de Bréval: A14 Bréval (future line 7825)

===== Lines transferred to Poissy – Les Mureaux =====
- Gare des Mureaux: A14 Verneuil (future line 7821)
- Gare de Vernouillet-Verneuil: A14 Mureaux (future line 7822)

===== Lines transferred to Saint-Germain – Boucles de Seine =====
- Chambourcy – Renaissance: A14 Chambourcy (future line 7824)

==== Development of lines operated by Entre Seine et Forêt ====
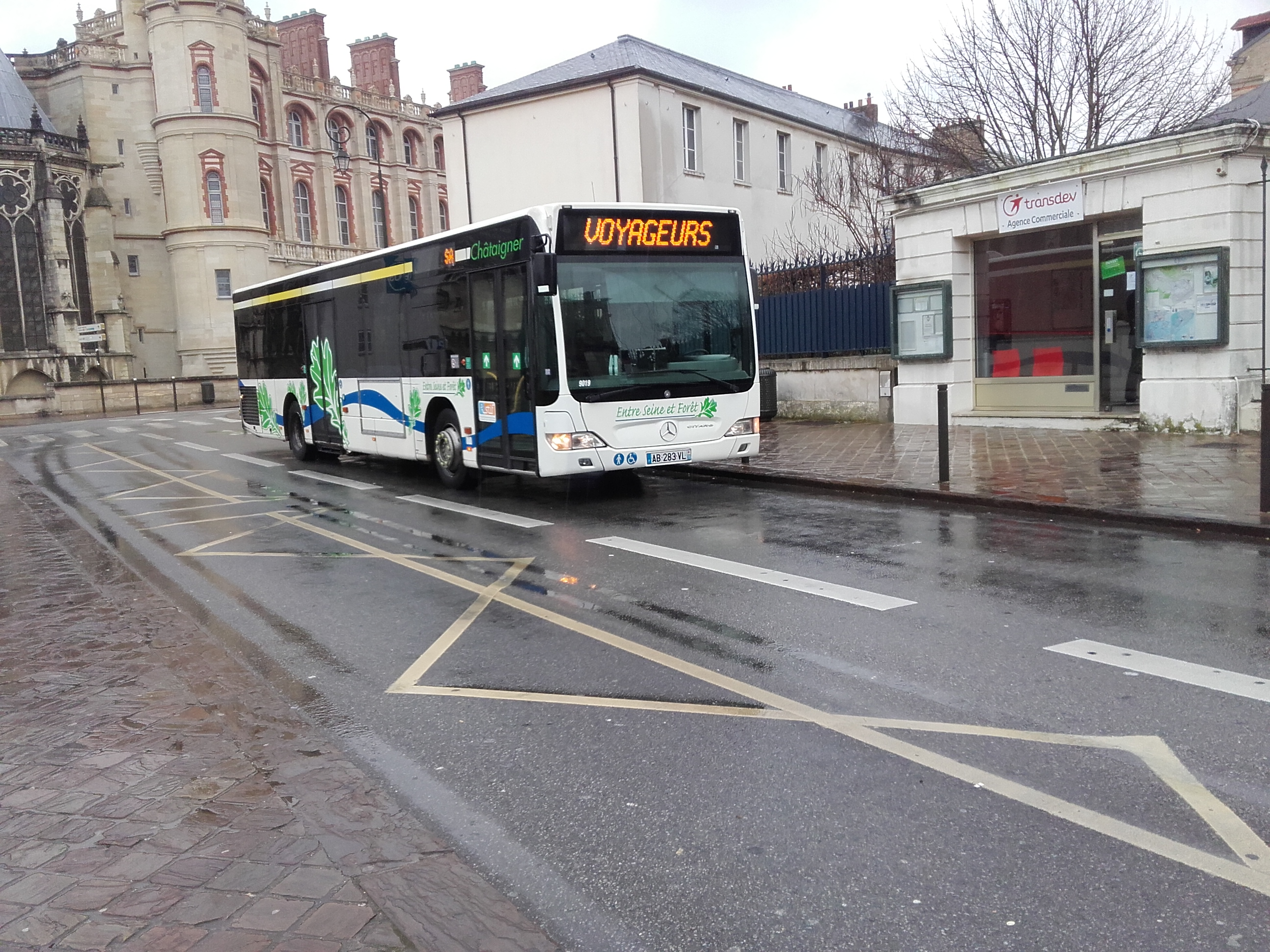
Mercedes-Benz Citaro Facelift n°9019 of the oldest network Entre Seine et Forêt

On July 31, 1998, the network of Entre Seine et Forêt was created. It consists of seven lines (9A, 9B, 9D, 9G, 10, 18 and 21). The network was operated with fourteen vehicles, including eleven standard buses. The fleet features a distinctive livery consisting of a blue pinstripe and two oak leaves on a white background.

On September 2, 2019, the network was restructured with many changes through the lines:

- A new shuttle was created under the name "NEX" and experimented for eight months between Le Mesnil-le-Roi (Quartier Cité) and Gare de Saint-Germain-en-Laye.
- The line 10 abandons his diversion to Le Pecq applicated during Sundays and holidays.
- The line 15 gains some services to Lycée International de Saint-Germain-en-Laye during school days.
- The line 20 is created between the Gare du Vésinet - Le Pecq to Gare du Vésinet - Centre, replacing the line 21M.
- The line 21 is simplified and extended to Gare de Marly-le-Roi, with a better frequency during rush hours.
- The line 21S is created as a school service of Le Pecq (École Félix-Éboué) replacing the old line 21M. However, this line serving a primary school, is limited to students only.

On January 1, 2022, the line 20 was integrated to Argenteuil – Boucles de Seine bus network due to the opening to the competition of transports in Île-de-France.

==== Development of lines operated by Poissy Aval - Deux Rives de Seine ====
Before the opening to the competition, the line 8 was integrated to Poissy Aval - Deux Rives de Seine.

==== Development of lines operated by Résalys ====
Before the opening to the competition, the old network of Résalys was restructured many times:

- In 1997, the network was operated by the CGEA Transport and serves the communes of Aigremont, Chambourcy, Fourqueux and Saint-Germain-en-Laye with the lines 3B, 3C, 3BC, 3D, 3E, 3F and 3G.
- In 2004, the network was operated by Connex Transport and serves the communes of Aigremont, Chambourcy, Fourqueux and Saint-Germain-en-Laye with lines A, B, C, BC, F, L, M, S, T, TS.
- In 2010, the network was operated by Veolia Transport and serves the communes of Aigremont, Chambourcy, Fourqueux, Mareil-Marly and Saint-Germain-en-Laye with lines R1, R2, R3, R4 and R5. Before the restructuring of the network this year, the commune of Mareil-Marly was served by the line 23 of Courriers de Seine-et-Oise (CSO).

On September 2, 2012, Transdev gained the operation of Résalys.

On August 30, 2015, a new line R6 was created.

On January 7, 2019, the network was restructured again, with a better frequency of the lines R1, R2, R3, R4 and R5 during rush hours.

==== Development of lines operated by Transdev Montesson Les Rabaux ====
Before the opening to the competition, the line Express 1 was integrated to Transdev Montesson Les Rabaux.

=== Opening to the competition ===
Due to the opening to the competition of public transport in Île-de-France, the networks operated by Transdev Montesson Les Rabaux and the CTCOP were merged to form the network of Saint-Germain – Boucles de Seine on August 1, 2022, corresponding to public service delegation number 32 established by Île-de-France Mobilités.

A call for tenders was therefore launched by the organizing authority to designate a company that will operate the network for a period of seven years. It was finally Transdev who gain the operation, through his subsidiary Transdev Boucle des Lys, which was designated during the board of directors on October 11, 2021.

At the time of its opening to the competition, the network consisted of the lines shown in the table below:

List of the lines of Saint-Germain – Boucles de Seine
Oldest network	Lines
CTCOP	A14 Chambourcy
Entre Seine et Forêt	9A, 9AB, 9B, 9D, 10, 15, 15S, 18S, 21, 21S
Poissy Aval - Deux Rives de Seine	8
Résalys	R1, R2, R3, R4, R5, R6
Transdev Montesson Les Rabaux	Express 1

The contract also includes the Noctilien line N153, operated by MobiCité and the SAVAC on behalf of RATP. However, the opening to the competition of the lines of the RATP only debuted on January 1, 2025. The line has not been included in the contract, and Viabus is operating it on behalf of RATP from October 1, 2022 to December 31, 2024.

On August 29, 2022, the line R6 ceased to exist, his services were transferred to lines R1, R2 and R3.

On August 28, 2022, the network was restructured with many changes through the lines of the network:

- The lines 9 and 11 are created in replacement of the lines 9A, 9AB, 9B and 9D.
- The line 12 is created to simplify the services of L'Étang-la-Ville.
- The lines 10 and 15 are restructured.

On March 1, 2025, the Noctilien line N153 was integrated to the network.

==== Restructuration of the network ====
From July 13, 2026, the lines of Saint-Germain – Boucles de Seine were renamed, in accordance with the single regional numbering system planned by Île-de-France Mobilités in order to remove duplicated lines. The new lines will all begin with the prefix "63", followed by the last two digits of the old number, as soon as possible. For Express lines, the number will include the department number (in this case, Yvelines, therefore "78") and the last two digits of the line number. These changes grants better services of the schools of the arrondissement of Saint-Germain-en-Laye and for the Tramway line 13.

The correspondence between old and new numbers is as follows:

Network renaming
Old	New
R1; R2N; R2S	6301; 6302
R4; 10	6304
R3N; R3S; R5	6305; 6306; 6307
8	6308
9	6309
11	6311
12	6312
15	6315
21	6321
18S	6350
21S	6351
A14 Chambourcy	7824
Express 1	7826

== Routes ==
=== Main routes ===
Only the line 6351 is limited to students, since this line serves a primary school.

Image	Line	First direction	Second direction
	6301	Gare de Saint-Germain-en-Laye	Gare de Saint-Germain-en-Laye - Bel-Air - Fourqueux
	6302	Gare de Saint-Germain-en-Laye	Gare de Saint-Germain-en-Laye - Bel-Air - Fourqueux
	6304	Marly-le-Roi – Mairie	Chambourcy – Collège André Derain; Poissy – Hôpital
	6305	Gare de Saint-Germain-en-Laye	Saint-Germain-en-Laye – Clos Badère
	6306	Gare de Saint-Germain-en-Laye	Gare de Saint-Germain-en-Laye - Bel-Air - Fourqueux
	6307	Gare de Saint-Germain-en-Laye	Saint-Germain-en-Laye – Lycée Léonard de Vinci
	6308	Gare de Poissy	Chambourcy – Châtaigneraie
	6309	Gare de Marly-le-Roi	Marly-le-Roi – Les Alizés
	6311	Gare de Marly-le-Roi	Gare de Mareil-Marly
	6312	Gare d'Étang - Les Sablons (circular line)	
	6315	Gare de Saint-Germain-en-Laye	Gare de Saint-Nom-la-Bretèche
	6321	Gare de Marly-le-Roi	Gare du Vésinet - Le Pecq
	6350	Le Pecq – Collège Jean Moulin	Louveciennes – Les Demeures
	6351	Le Pecq – École primaire Félix Éboué	Le Pecq – Rue de Seine
	7824	La Défense – Terminal Jules Verne	Chambourcy – Renaissance
	7826	Gare de Saint-Germain-en-Laye	Gare de Versailles-Chantiers

=== Noctilien ===
From March 1, 2025, the Noctilien line N153 was integrated to the network, and operated by Transdev through their subsidiary Transdev Boucle des Lys.

Image	Line	First direction	Second direction
	N153	Paris-Saint-Lazare	Gare de Saint-Germain-en-Laye

=== Night routes ===
The network is also completed with a night line named Soirée Saint-Germain-en-Laye.

Image	Line
	Soirée Saint-Germain-en-Laye

=== Demand-responsive transport ===
The network also operates a demand-responsive transport named TàD Aigremont - Chambourcy.

Image	Line
	TàD Aigremont - Chambourcy

== See also ==
- Île-de-France Mobilités
