= Chambourcy =

- Commune
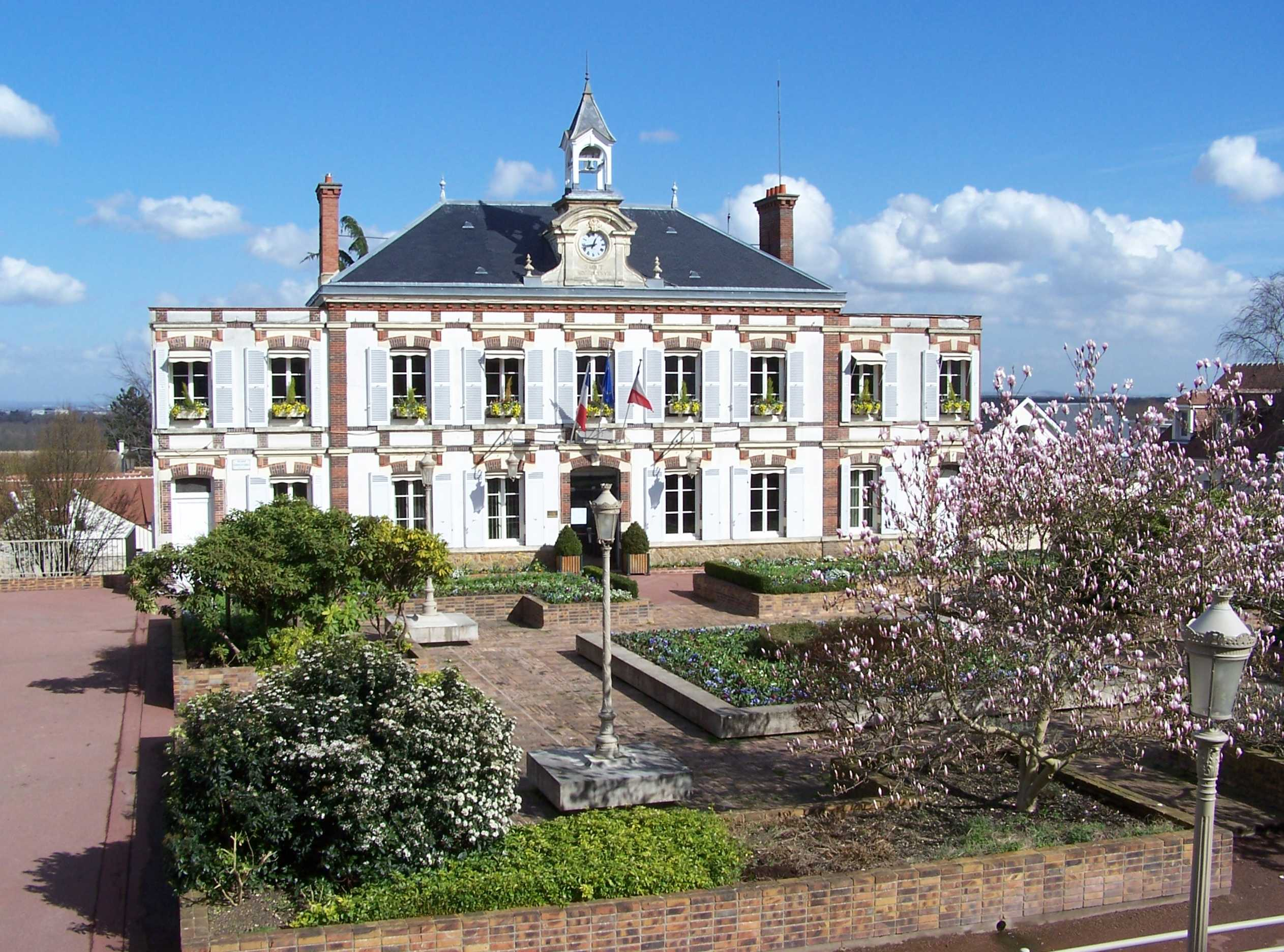
- Town hall

- Coat of arms
- Location of Chambourcy
- Location within France Location within Île-de-France (region)
- Coordinates: 48°54′24″N 2°02′28″E
- Country: France
- Region: Île-de-France
- Department: Yvelines
- Arrondissement: Saint-Germain-en-Laye
- Canton: Saint-Germain-en-Laye
- Intercommunality: CA Saint Germain Boucles Seine

Government
  - Mayor (2020–2026): Pierre Morange
- Area^{1}: 7.87 km^{2} (3.04 sq mi)
- Elevation: 158 m (518 ft)
- Highest elevation: 176 m (577 ft)
- Lowest elevation: 64 m (210 ft)
- Population (2023): 5,847
  - Density: 743/km^{2} (1,920/sq mi)
- Time zone: UTC+01:00 (CET)
  - Summer (DST): UTC+02:00 (CEST)
- INSEE/Postal code: 78133 /78240
- ^{1} French Land Register data, which excludes lakes, ponds, glaciers > 1 km^{2} (0.386 sq mi or 247 acres) and river estuaries.

Chambourcy (French pronunciation: [ʃɑ̃buʁsi]) is a commune in the Yvelines department in the Île-de-France region in north-central France. It is located 3 km (1.9 mi) west of Saint-Germain-en-Laye and about 25 km (16 mi) west of Paris.

Its inhabitants are called Camboriciens. "Chambourcy", formerly "Champ Bourcy", is derived from the Latin expression "campus bruacii", field of brushlands.

The current mayor, and mayor since 1995 is Pierre Morange. He has also been a member of the French National Assembly since 1997.

== Geography ==
Chambourcy is located to the south of the forest of Saint-Germain-en-Laye and to the north of the forest of Marly. It is bordered by Poissy to the north, Saint-Germain-en-Laye to the northeast, Fourqueux to the east, Aigremont to the west, and Feucherolles and Saint-Nom-la-Bretèche to the south. Its northern half is highly urbanised, whereas the southern half is very wooded (the forest of Marly) and includes a golf course.

The commune of Chambourcy is served by the route nationale 13, called the 40 sous route (route de quarante sous), which crosses it to the west. It is also served by the autoroutes A13 to the southwest and A14 to the north, though the nearest access to either is the Orgeval junction about 5 km (3.1 mi) away.

A small 9 km stream, the Buzot, runs through the commune towards the east (mostly in underground channels), crossing the commune of Saint-Germain-en-Laye before discharging in the river Seine at Le Pecq.

== Transport ==
Buses: There is a Gare Routiere(Long Haul bus Staition) Line R4 serves the city center of Saint-Germain-en-Laye, Aigremont, Yvelines, the Lycée International (Secondary). Line 52 connects Poissy St. Éxupery via Poissy Gare Sud. Line 08 connects Poissy Station Line 21 connects Saint Germain en Laye Gambetta/Thiers with Les Mureaux Staition via Orgeval and Maule stopping 4 times in Chambourcy.

Train and Rail: R.ER A to La Défense Paris (Etoile, Auber, Châtelet-les-Halles, Gare de Lyon, Nation) Connection from Poissy RER A to La Défense and Paris (Etoile, Auber, Chatelet-les-Halles, Gare de Lyon, Nation)

== History ==
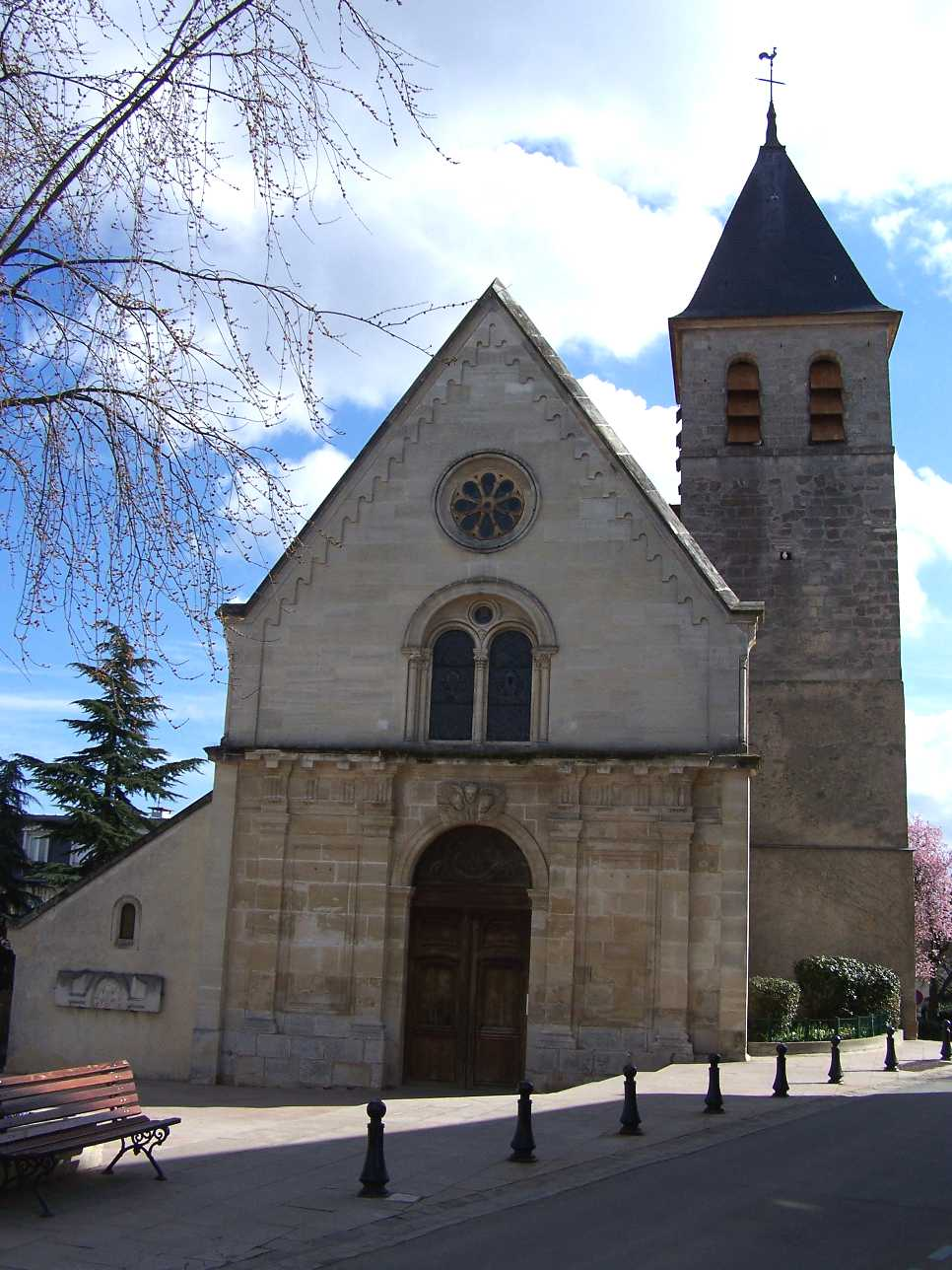
St Clothilde church

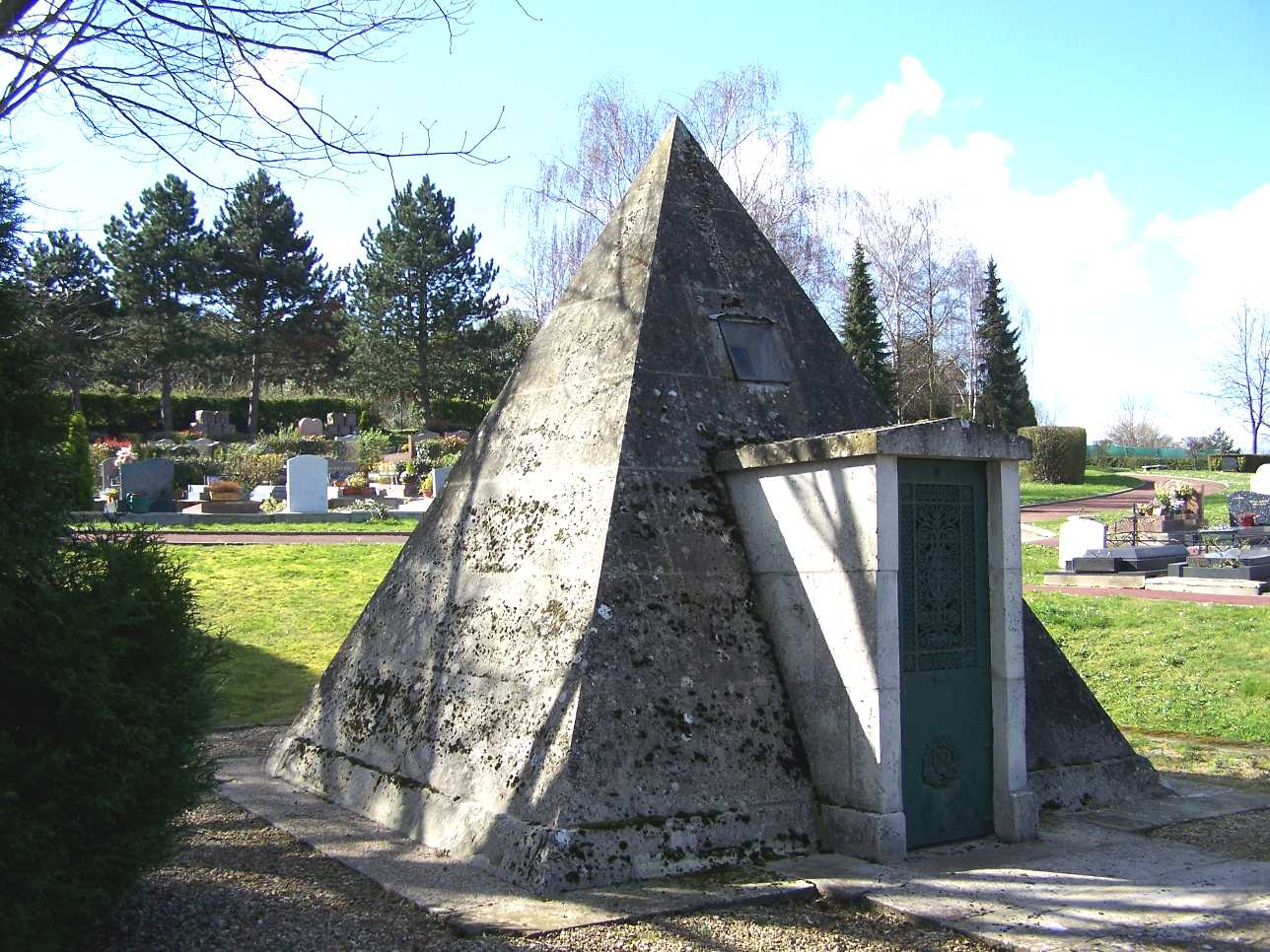
Tomb of d'Orsay and Marguerite

The town's church, dedicated to Saint Clothilde (wife of Clovis I, king of the Franks, whom she convinced to convert to Christianity), was built in the 12th century, in the Romanesque style, though it has frequently been rebuilt. It contains relics of its name saint. In the 13th century an abbey was built near the commune, at Joyenval, and its ruins on the golf course were listed as historic monuments in 1989.

In 1789 the "desert of Retz" was built on the site of the abandoned and ruined village of Saint-Jacques-de-Retz to the north of Chambourcy, on the fringes of the forest of Marly. It was a Romantic garden made up of a number of follies, including a ruined column, a pyramid, and a Chinese pavilion. It was declared a historic monument in 1941.

Number 64 of the Grande Rue, called the Roseraie, was also built in Chambourcy in the 18th century. André Derain (one of the founders of Fauvism) later installed his workshop there. The house was rebuilt in the 19th and 20th centuries, and listed as a historic monument in 1986.

A 19th-century chateau, not far from the village in the direction of Aigremont, is now a retirement home.

In 1934 the ALB dairy was founded in Chambourcy. In 1948 it launched the "petit Chambourcy", a petit-suisse.

== Population ==
Historical population
Year	Pop.	±% p.a.
1968	2,515	—
1975	4,763	+9.55%
1982	5,052	+0.85%
1990	5,163	+0.27%
1999	5,077	−0.19%
2007	5,844	+1.77%
2012	5,857	+0.04%
2017	5,634	−0.77%
2023	5,847	+0.62%
Source: INSEE

== Notable people ==
- Jacob-Nicolas Moreau (1717–1803), last seigneur of Chambourcy.
- Antoine de Gramont, husband of Ida d'Orsay, acquired a property at Chambourcy in 1848 where they welcomed Ida's brother Alfred d'Orsay, who was buried with his lover Lady Blessington in a pyramidal tomb in Chambourcy.
- Ted Naifeh, cartoonist.

== Economy ==
- Cheese
- Residential commune.
- Shopping centre off nationale 13 (Many car stores, Carrefour hypermarchés, Decathlon (sports store), Fly (furniture store), etc.)
- Arboriculture.
- Golf course

Chambourcy gave its name to a group of dairy products, one of the most important in the French and European markets until taken over by the Nestlé group, who abandoned the "Chambourcy" trademark in 1996, then relaunched it in 1998.

== Population ==
Chambourcy's population by age group was the following in 2007:

- 47,9% male (0 to 14 years old = 23,1%, 15 to 29 years old = 16,7%, 30 to 44 years old = 20,3%, 45 to 59 years old = 21,4%, over 60 years old = 18,6%);
- 52,1% female (0 à 14 years old = 19,9%, 15 to 29 years old = 15,6%, 30 to 44 years old = 20,9%, 45 to 59 years old = 21,2%, over 60 years old= 22,5%)

Chambourcy is home to a considerable number of students and families linked to the Lycée International of Saint Germain en Laye, an international school situated near the commune.

== Associations ==
- (Germany) Elbingerode (Saxony-Anhalt).
- (England) Lutterworth (Leicestershire).
- (France) Flottille 32F (flotille of naval Super Frelons helicopters).

== See also ==
- Communes of the Yvelines department
