= Saint-Germain-en-Laye station =

Railway station in Saint-Germain-en-Laye, France

Coordinates: 48.898°N 2.095°E

Saint-Germain-en-Laye
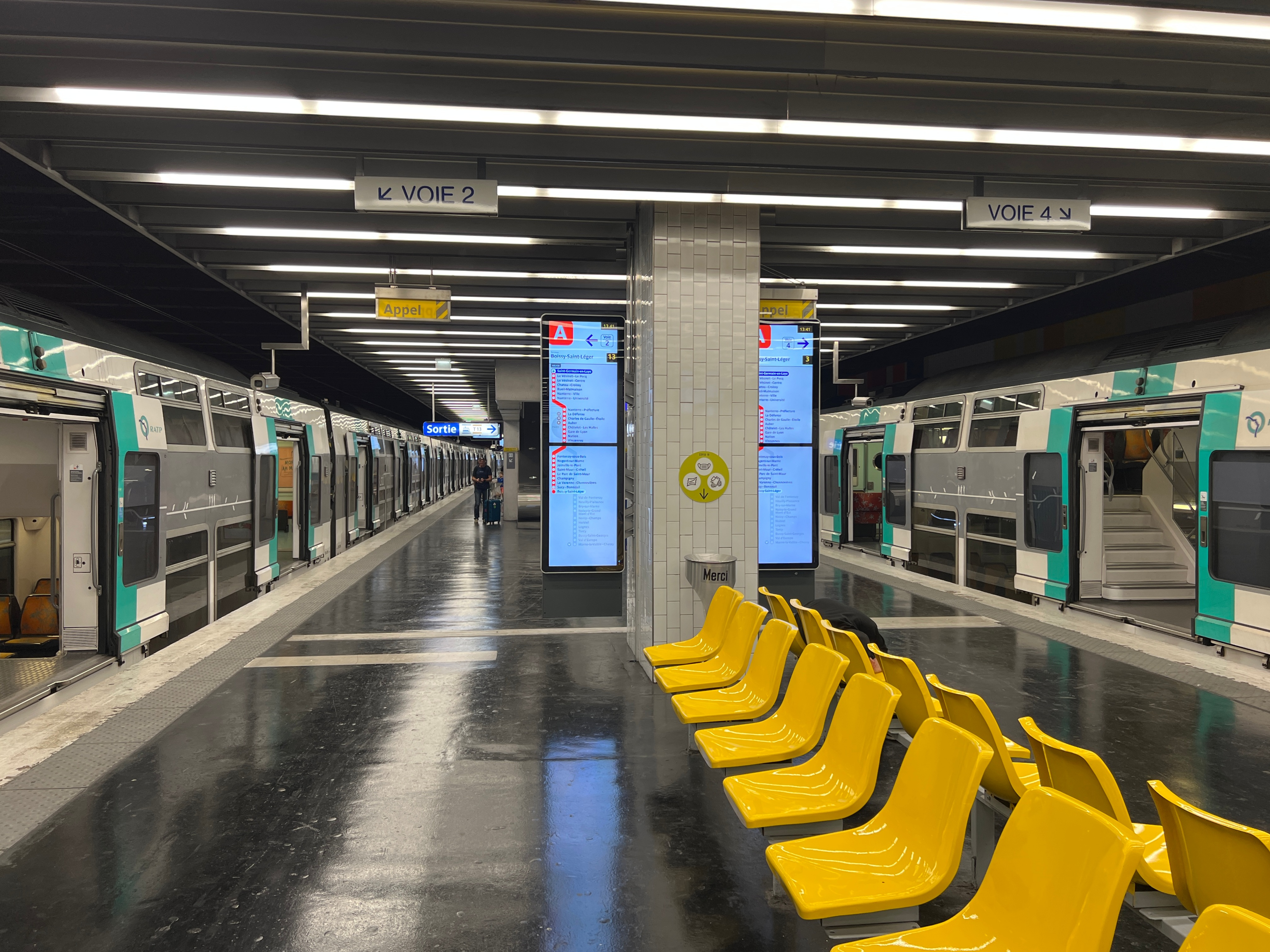
- Saint-Germain-en-Laye station platform

General information
- Owner: RATP
- Platforms: 1 side platform 1 island platform

Construction
- Accessible: Yes, by request to staff

Other information
- Station code: 87758094
- Fare zone: 4

History
- Opened: 14 August 1847; 179 years ago

Services
Preceding station	RER	Following station
Terminus	RER A	Le Vésinet–Le Pecq towards Boissy-Saint-Léger
Preceding station	Tram	Following station
Terminus	T13	Camp des Loges towards Saint-Cyr
Location

Saint-Germain-en-Laye is the main railway station serving Saint-Germain-en-Laye, France. The station opened on 14 August 1847 with the opening of the Paris-St-Lazare–St-Germain-en-Laye railway, ligne de Saint Germain (from Paris to Saint-Germain), an atmospheric railway. It was the first railway line in the Île-de-France. Twelve years later, conventional locomotives replaced the atmospheric powered engines. The original station had a large veranda building above the terminating lines.

The Saint-Germain-en-Laye underground terminal station is located at the end of the Paris-Saint-Lazare to Saint-Germain-en-Laye line, after the Vésinet–Le Pecq station.

== History ==
The line from Paris to Saint-Germain-en-Laye was the first railway line in the Île-de-France, completed in 1837. Due to the elevation of the plateau on which the town was built, the western terminus was built in the neighbouring town of Le Pecq, on the opposite bank of the Seine from Saint-Germain-en-Laye. It was closed when a viaduct was built to cross the Seine and more powerful locomotives allowed trains to climb the slope leading to the Saint-Germain terrace. The line used atmospheric locomotives for the last section from Le Pecq to Saint-German, crossing the Seine on a bridge and entering two tunnels to end just below the chateau. The power for the atmospheric line came from a pumping station in Saint-Germain. The time from Le Pecq to Paris dropped from a four-hour boat trip to 25-30 minutes by train.

The extension to the Saint-Germain-en-Laye station, on the rue de la Surintendance, was opened on August 14, 1847. It was a building with a rounded facade that provided access to the tracks located below the terrace of the Château de Saint-Germain-en-Laye. In 1859 service was increased from ten trains per day to 16, with 2,300,000 passengers per year. The following year the introduction of more powerful steam locomotives allowed the atmospheric railway to be discontinued, and in 1861 22 trains per day were provided. The original Le Pecq station was abandoned, buried under new constructions, and only exhumed during archaeological excavations in 2017.

On November 30, 1882, a connecting track to the Grande Ceinture's Saint-Germain-en-Laye station was put into service. A plan for rebuilding the station, which was more than 60 years old and described as "inconvenient, cramped and smelly," was proposed by 1922.

The station at the beginning of the 1900s

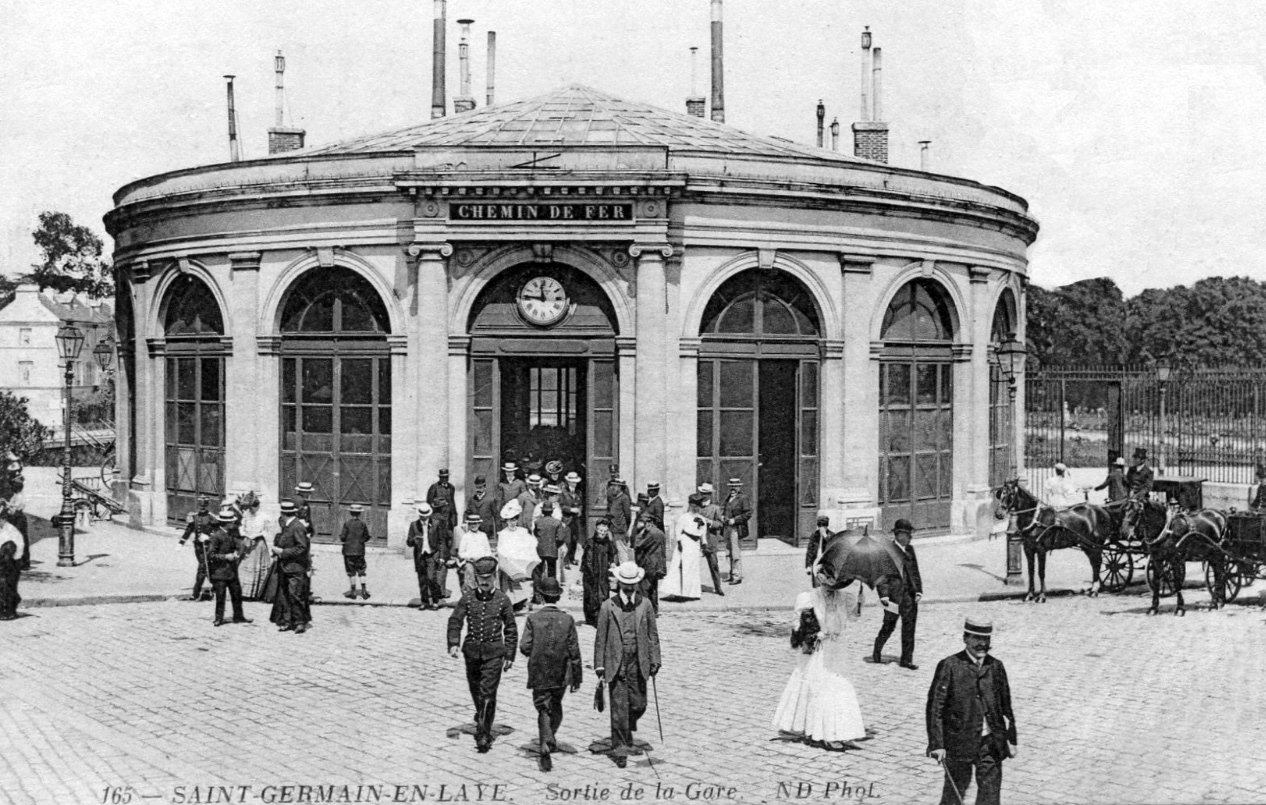
Front

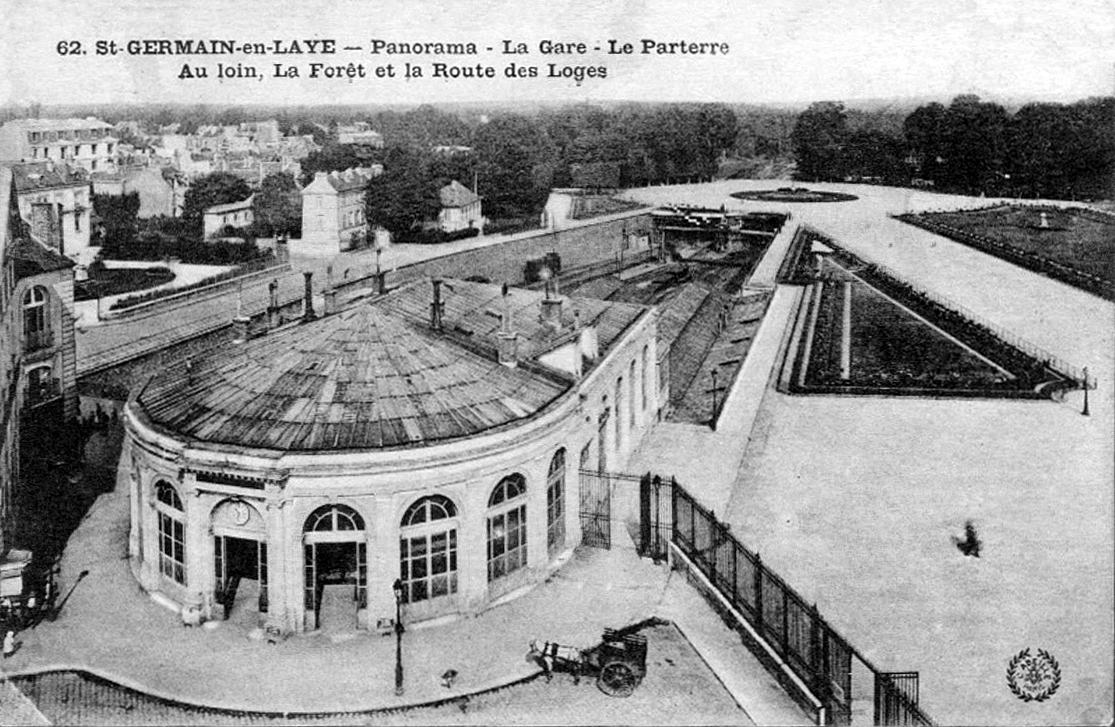
View from above

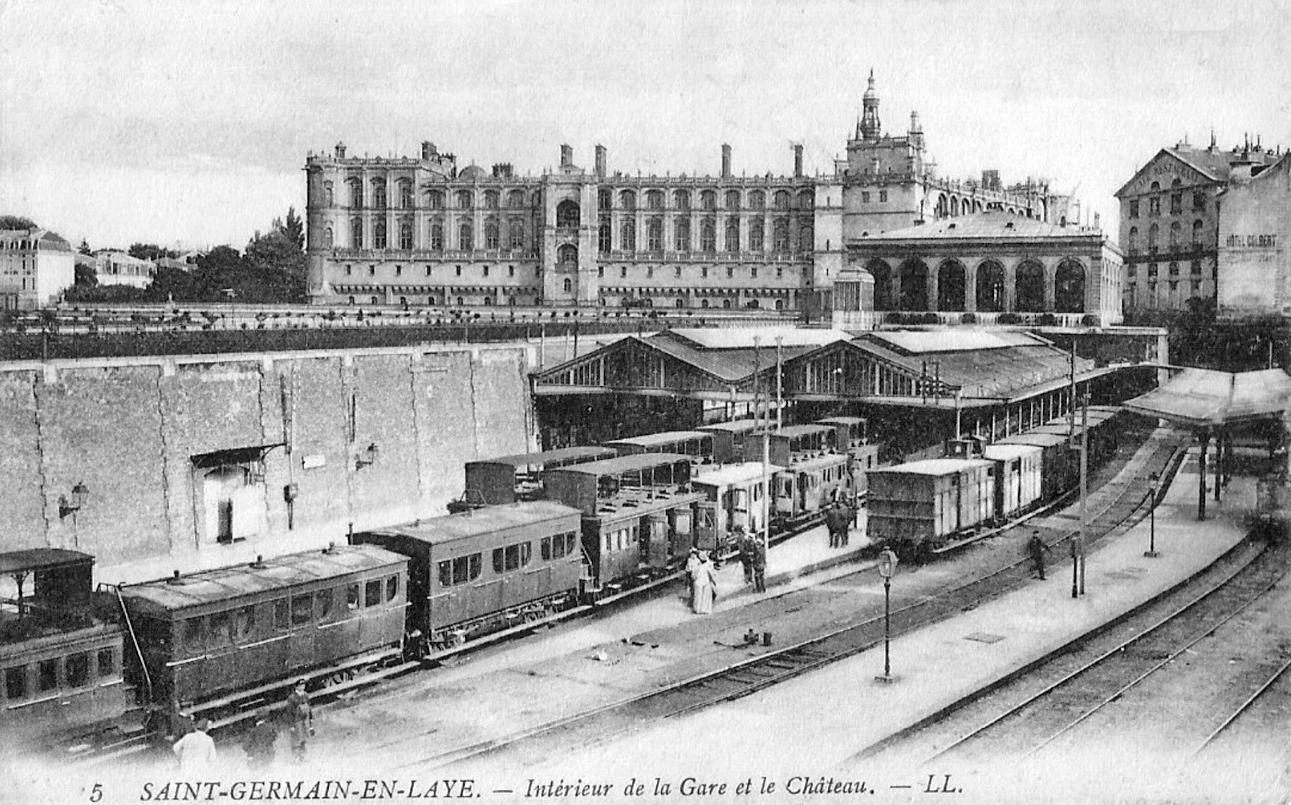
Station and chateau

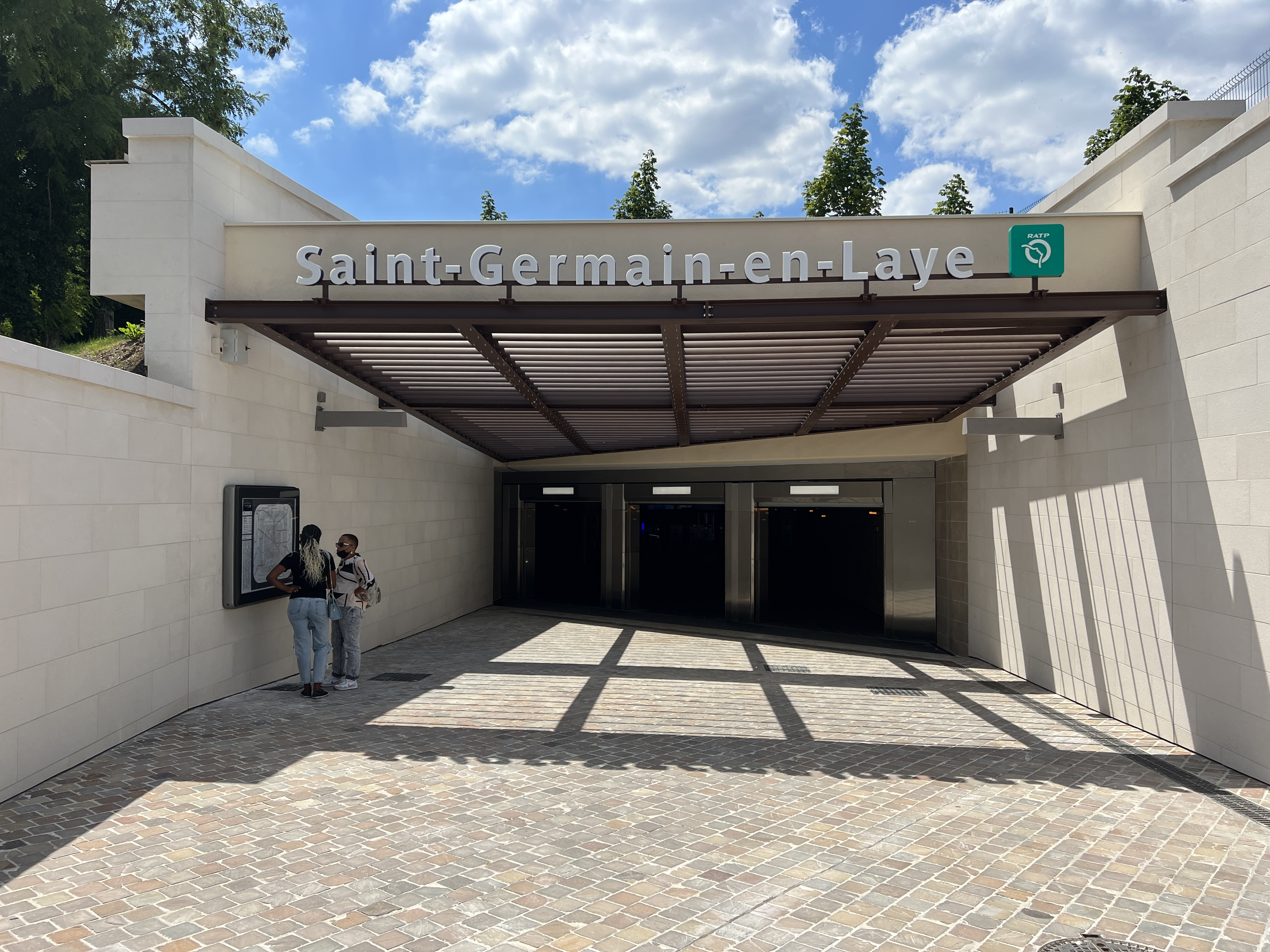
The entrance to the underground station from the tram station

In 1924 work began to modernize the station. The line was electrified in 1927, and the station work was complete by 1928. This station was destroyed during the conversion of the rail link into the Île-de-France regional express network (RER). It was replaced by an underground station.

The section of the Saint-Germain line from Nanterre to Saint-Germain was transferred from the SNCF to the RATP in 1972. The station was replaced by an underground station beneath the chateau terrace.

In 2022 an underground connection with moving sidewalks was opened to connect the RER station with the Saint-Germain-en-Laye–Grande-Ceinture tram station on the Île-de-France tramway Line 13 Express line occupying the former Grande Ceinture.

== Access ==
The station has four entrances, at the Hôtel de Ville, the Église Saint-Germain, the T13 tram station, and the Château.

== Connections ==
The station is served by the following bus lines :

- RATP Bus: 259
- Cergy-Pontoise Confluence: 1204
- Île-de-France Ouest: 7802
- Centre et Sud Yvelines: 5323
- Mantois: 5422
- Saint-Germain - Boucles de Seine: 6301 6302 6304 6305 6306 6307 6315 7826
- Argenteuil - Boucles de Seine: 6412 6431
- Poissy - Les Mureaux: 6501 6542 6570 6577
- Noctilien: N153

== Service ==
Saint-Germain-en-Laye is served by trains on the A1 branch of line A of the RER d'Île-de-France, of which it is the terminus. The service is provided at a rate of one train every 8 to 12 minutes during off-peak hours on weekdays and every 10 minutes on weekends and public holidays as well as during peak hours. In the evening, the service frequency is 15 minutes, both for departures and arrivals.
