= Fourqueux =

- Part of Saint-Germain-en-Laye
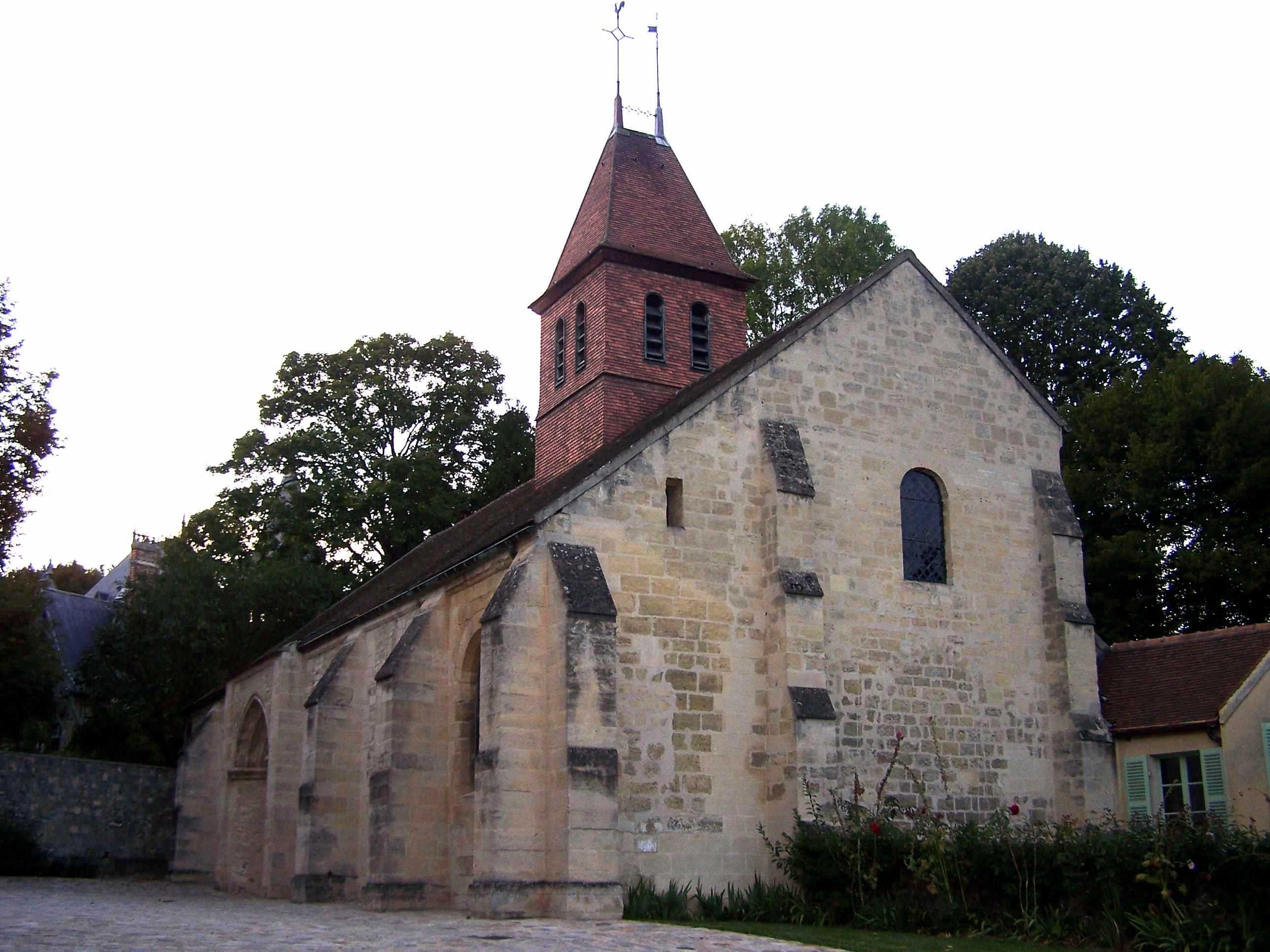
- The church in Fourqueux

- Coat of arms
- Location of Fourqueux
- Location within France Location within Île-de-France (region)
- Coordinates: 48°53′15″N 2°03′58″E
- Country: France
- Region: Île-de-France
- Department: Yvelines
- Arrondissement: Saint-Germain-en-Laye
- Canton: Saint-Germain-en-Laye
- Commune: Saint-Germain-en-Laye
- Area^{1}: 3.67 km^{2} (1.42 sq mi)
- Elevation: 120 m (390 ft)
- Highest elevation: 176 m (577 ft)
- Lowest elevation: 67 m (220 ft)
- Population (2023): 4,218
  - Density: 1,150/km^{2} (2,980/sq mi)
- Time zone: UTC+01:00 (CET)
  - Summer (DST): UTC+02:00 (CEST)
- Postal code: 78112
- ^{1} French Land Register data, which excludes lakes, ponds, glaciers > 1 km^{2} (0.386 sq mi or 247 acres) and river estuaries.

Fourqueux (French pronunciation: [fuʁkø]) is a former commune in the Yvelines department in the Île-de-France in north-central France. On 1 January 2019, it was merged into the commune Saint-Germain-en-Laye. It is a small suburb 20 km west of Paris.

It is known for having a diverse community, due to the Lycée International being located in the neighboring town of Saint-Germain-en-Laye. Fourqueux has received prizes for its flowers on the departmental and regional level every year since 2005.

== Population ==
Fourqueux's population as of 2013 was 4,035 people composing 1,652 households. The average yearly income per household in 2009 was 72,741 euros, over twice the average of the Yvelines department as a whole.

Historical population

Year	Pop.	±% p.a.
1793	462	—
1821	367	−0.82%
1846	320	−0.55%
1872	359	+0.44%
1901	351	−0.08%
1911	350	−0.03%
1921	345	−0.14%
1926	490	+7.27%
1931	653	+5.91%
1936	672	+0.58%
1946	603	−1.08%

Year	Pop.	±% p.a.
1954	782	+3.30%
1962	840	+0.90%
1968	966	+2.36%
1975	2,029	+11.18%
1982	2,307	+1.85%
1990	4,053	+7.30%
1999	4,161	+0.29%
2007	4,173	+0.04%
2012	4,055	−0.57%
2023	4,218	+0.36%

Source: EHESS and INSEE (2007-2023)

== See also ==
- Communes of the Yvelines department
