= Le Vésinet =

- Commune
- Le Vésinet Town Hall

- Coat of arms

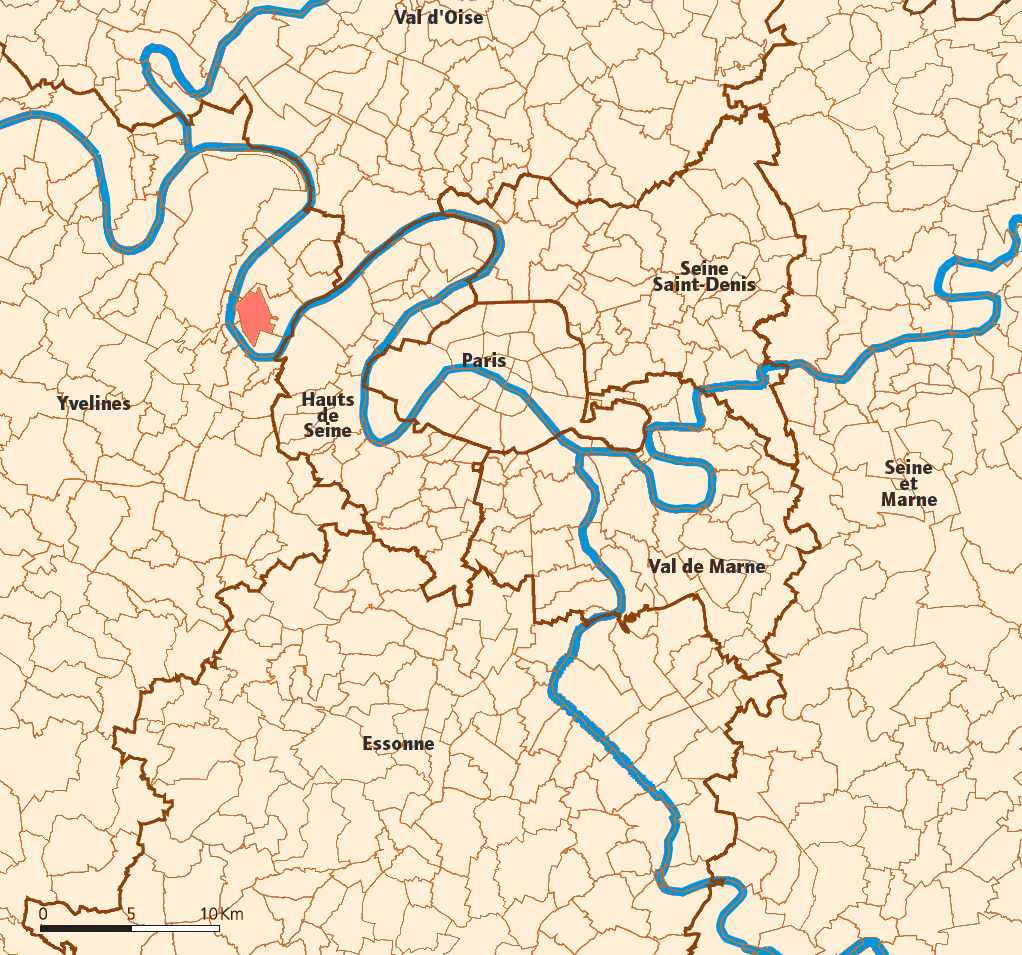
- Location (in red) within Paris inner and outer suburbs
- Location of Le Vésinet
- Location within France Location within Île-de-France (region)
- Coordinates: 48°53′32″N 2°07′59″E
- Country: France
- Region: Île-de-France
- Department: Yvelines
- Arrondissement: Saint-Germain-en-Laye
- Canton: Chatou
- Intercommunality: CA Saint Germain Boucles Seine

Government
  - Mayor (2020–2026): Bruno Coradetti
- Area^{1}: 5.0 km^{2} (1.9 sq mi)
- Highest elevation: 47 m (154 ft)
- Lowest elevation: 26 m (85 ft)
- Population (2023): 15,554
  - Density: 3,100/km^{2} (8,100/sq mi)
- Time zone: UTC+01:00 (CET)
  - Summer (DST): UTC+02:00 (CEST)
- INSEE/Postal code: 78650 /78110
- ^{1} French Land Register data, which excludes lakes, ponds, glaciers > 1 km^{2} (0.386 sq mi or 247 acres) and river estuaries.

Le Vésinet (French: [l(ə) vezinɛ]) is a suburban commune in the Yvelines department in the Île-de-France region in north-central France. It is a part of the affluent outer suburbs of western Paris, 16.4 km (10.2 mi) from the centre of Paris.

Le Vésinet is one of the wealthiest suburbs of Paris, known for its wooded avenues, mansions and lakes. It contains many public gardens designed by French landscape gardener Paul de Lavenne, comte de Choulot.

== History ==
The commune of Le Vésinet was created on 31 May 1875 by detaching a part of the territory of Chatou and merging it with a part of the territory of Croissy-sur-Seine and a part of the territory of Le Pecq.

In 1925 and from 1927 to 1939, the Tour de France began in Le Vésinet.

== Geography ==
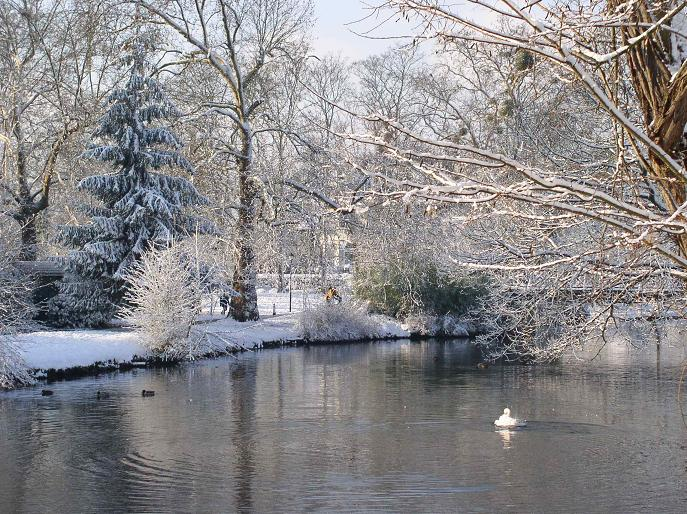
Parc des Ibis

Le Vésinet is located in a bend of the Seine, but has no access to the river. It is 16.4 km (10.2 mi) west of Paris and 4 km east of Saint-Germain-en-Laye. The surrounding communes are Chatou on the east, Croissy-sur-Seine on the south, Le Pecq on the west, and Montesson on the north.

The terrain is an alluvial plain ranging in altitude from 28 meters near Le Pecq to 45 meters at the end of the Route de Montesson, with a gentle slope from northeast to southwest.

The commune is entirely urbanized, principally with single-family dwellings. Green space comprises 20 percent of the territory. There are a number of lakes: the lac Supérieur, the lac Inférieur, the lac de la Station, the lac de Croissy, and the Grand lac (with a large central island, l'Île des Ibis) also called Lac des Ibis. These lakes are linked by nearly 4 km of artificial streams called les Petites Rivières.

== Population ==
Historical population

Year	Pop.	±% p.a.
1872	2,285	—
1876	2,465	+1.91%
1881	3,329	+6.19%
1886	4,460	+6.02%
1891	4,342	−0.53%
1896	4,895	+2.43%
1901	5,414	+2.04%
1906	5,680	+0.96%
1911	6,353	+2.26%
1921	7,610	+1.82%
1926	9,405	+4.33%
1931	11,222	+3.60%
1936	11,712	+0.86%

Year	Pop.	±% p.a.
1946	13,020	+1.06%
1954	15,665	+2.34%
1962	17,964	+1.73%
1968	18,459	+0.45%
1975	17,986	−0.37%
1982	17,272	−0.58%
1990	15,945	−0.99%
1999	15,921	−0.02%
2007	16,399	+0.37%
2012	15,901	−0.61%
2017	15,889	−0.02%
2023	15,554	−0.35%

Source: EHESS and INSEE (1968–2023)

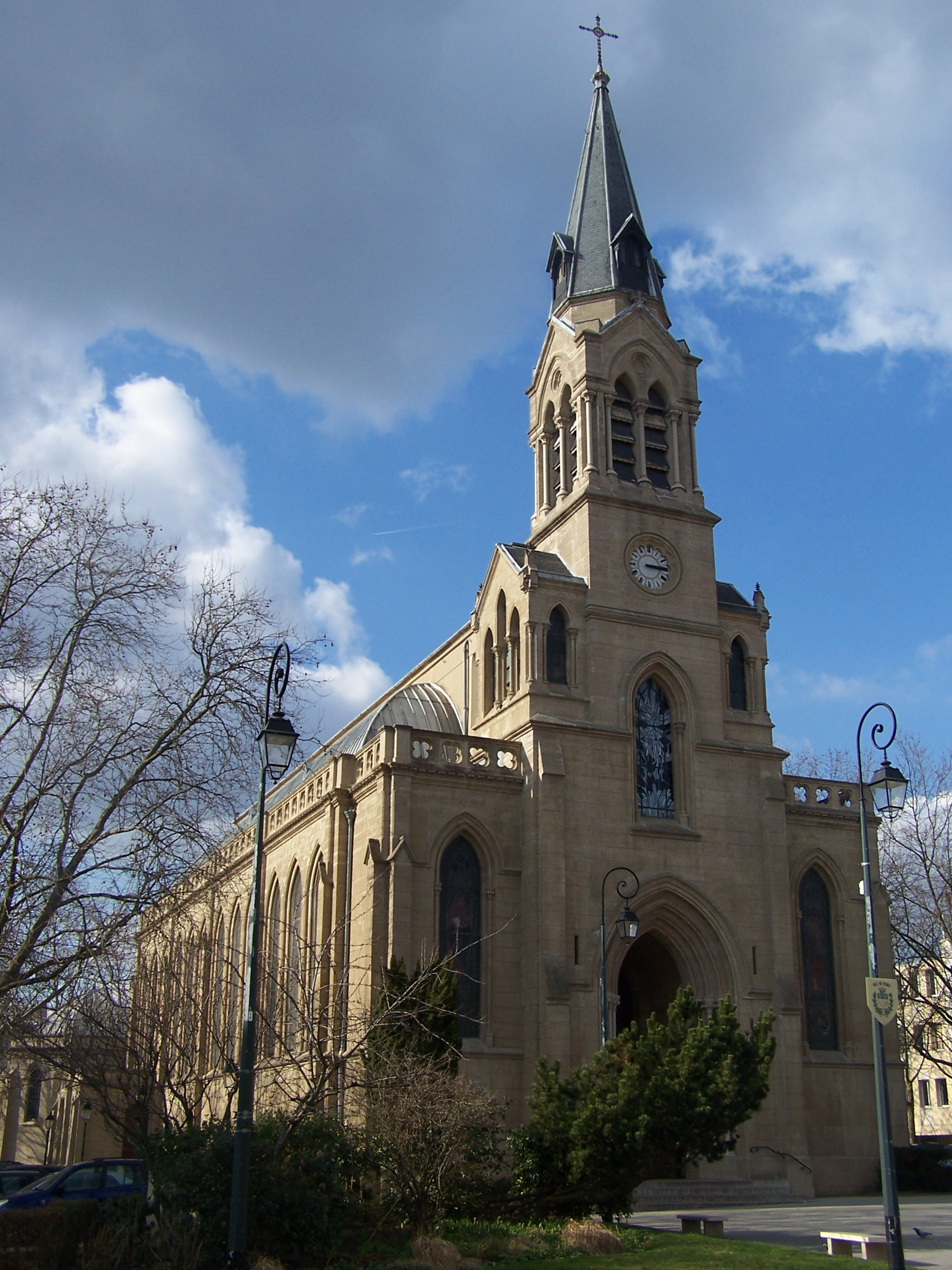
Sainte-Marguerite

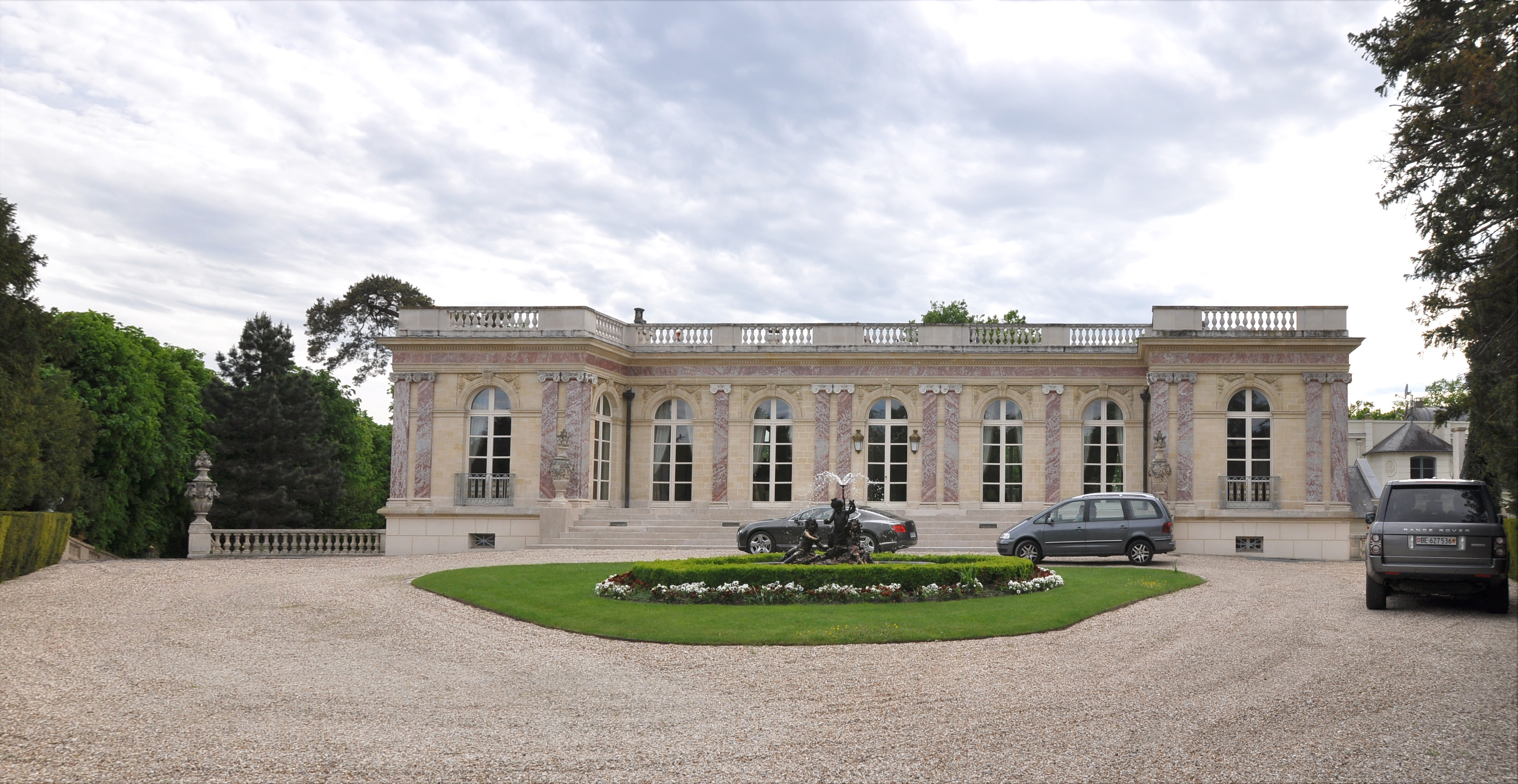
Rose Palace

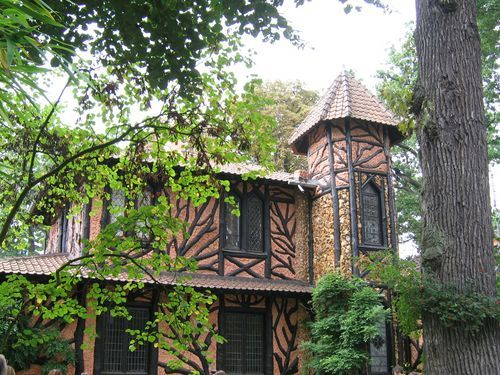
Wood Cottage

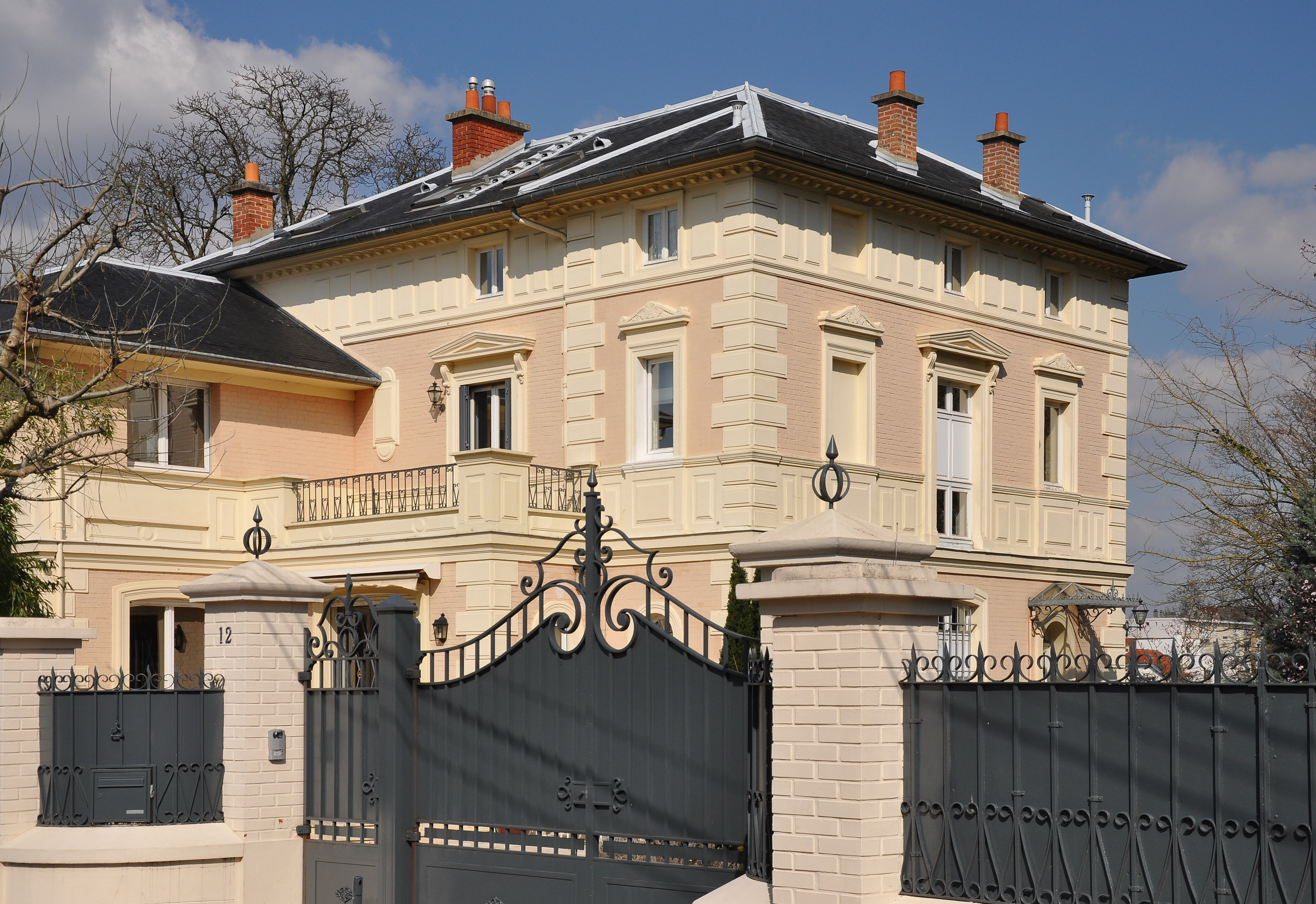
Villa Olivia

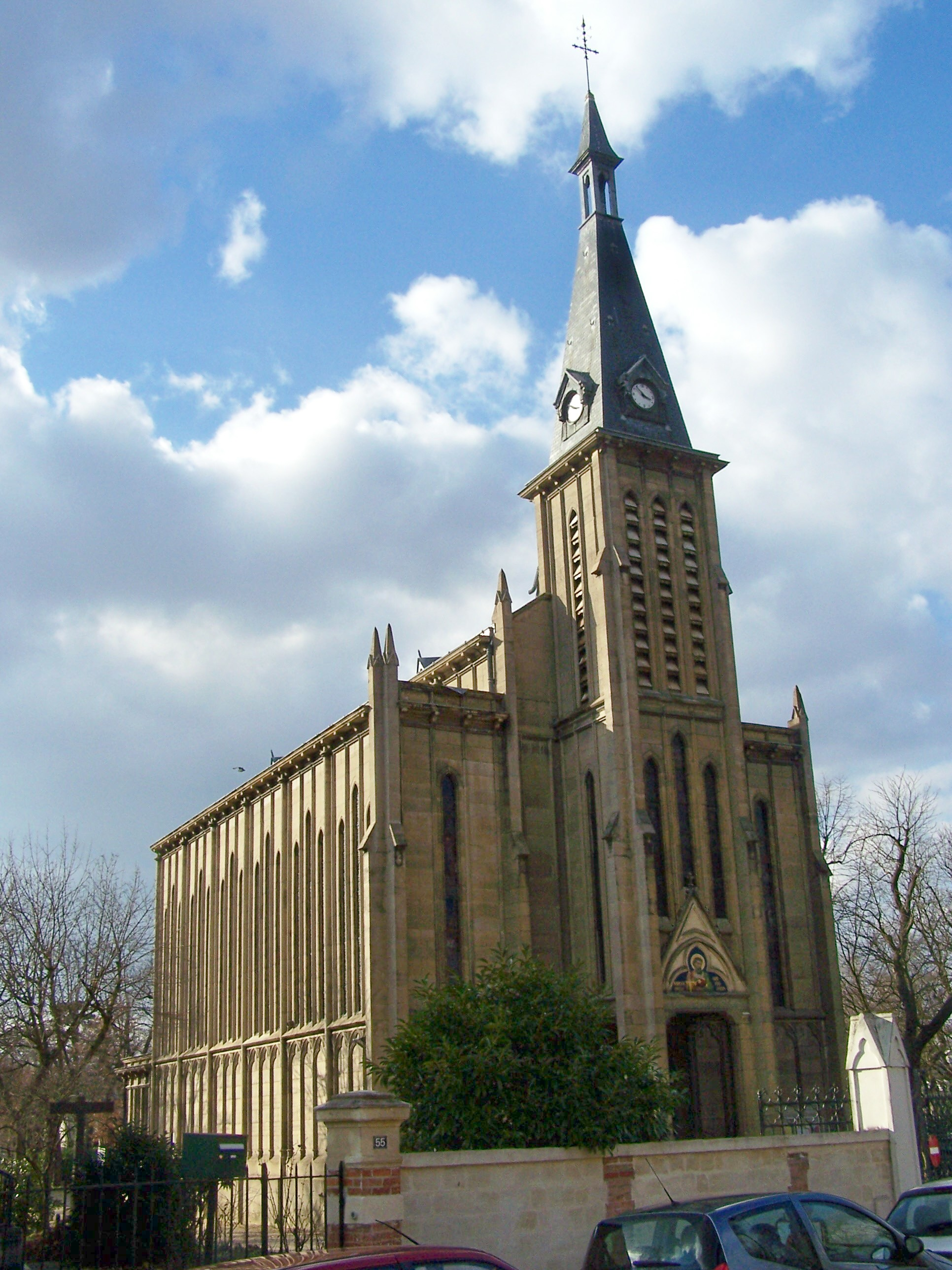
Sainte-Pauline

== Sights ==
Le Vésinet was the first "ville-parc" to be built in France. It has many green spaces, lakes, and lavish mansions.

The following are notable buildings:

- L'hôpital du Vésinet (72 avenue de la Princesse), built by Eugène Laval in 1859
- Sainte-Marguerite (place de l'Eglise), built by Louis-Auguste Boileau from 1862 to 1865, the first non-industrial building in France built of concrete
- Villa Berthe ou La Hublotière (72 route de Montesson), built by Hector Guimard in 1896.
- Pink Palace (12 rue Diderot), built on the model of the Grand Trianon in Versailles by Arthur Schweitzer about 1900
- Wood Cottage (122 boulevard des Etats-Unis), classified as a historic monument in 2000. Built in 1864 by Tricotel, a landscaping firm.
- Villa Olivia (12 avenue Rembrandt) built by Pierre-Joseph Olive
- Sainte-Pauline, built in 1905

Since 1997, Le Vésinet has received the ultimate distinction of four flowers in the national competition for villes fleuries.

== Transport ==
Le Vésinet is served by two stations on Paris RER line A: Le Vésinet – Centre and Le Vésinet – Le Pecq.

== Education ==
The following public schools are in Le Vésinet:

Preschools:

- Ecole maternelle Centre
- Ecole maternelle Charmettes
- Ecole maternelle La Borde
- Ecole maternelle Princesse
- Ecole maternelle Les Cygnes

Elementary schools:

- Ecole élémentaire Merlettes
- Ecole élémentaire Pallu
- Ecole élémentaire Pasteur
- Ecole élémentaire Princesse

Secondary schools:

- Collège du Cèdre (junior high school)
- Lycée Alain (senior high school/sixth form college)

Private schools:

- Bon-Sauveur (preschool through senior high school)
- Sainte-Jeanne-d’Arc (preschool and elementary school)
- Sainte-Odile (preschool and elementary school)
- Ecole Saint-Charles (elementary school)

International school:

- Malherbe International School (nursery through middle school)

Le Vésinet is served by the Bibliothèque intercommunale du Vésinet, a library.

== Twin towns – sister cities ==
Le Vésinet is twinned with:

- Oakwood, United States
- Outremont (Montreal), Canada
- Unterhaching, Germany
- Villanueva de la Cañada, Spain
- Worcester, England, United Kingdom

Le Vésinet also has friendly relations with Hunters Hill in Australia.

== See also ==
- Communes of the Yvelines department
