= L'Étang-la-Ville =

L'Étang-la Ville
- Commune
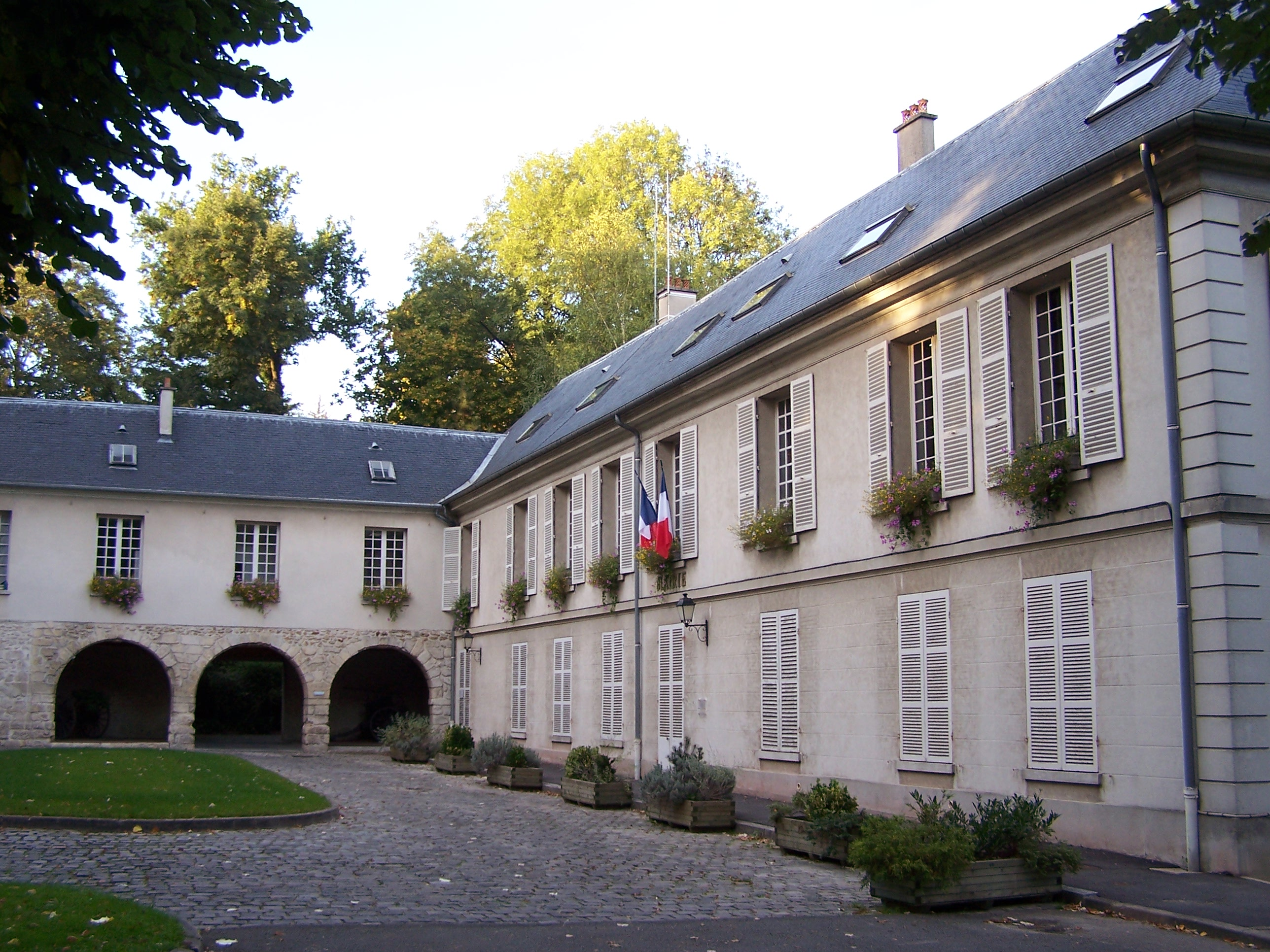
- Town hall

- Coat of arms
- Location of L'Étang-la Ville
- Location within France Location within Île-de-France (region)
- Coordinates: 48°52′10″N 2°04′19″E
- Country: France
- Region: Île-de-France
- Department: Yvelines
- Arrondissement: Saint-Germain-en-Laye
- Canton: Saint-Germain-en-Laye
- Intercommunality: CA Saint Germain Boucles Seine

Government
  - Mayor (2020–2026): Daniel Cornalba
- Area^{1}: 5.38 km^{2} (2.08 sq mi)
- Elevation: 66 m (217 ft)
- Highest elevation: 178 m (584 ft)
- Lowest elevation: 64 m (210 ft)
- Population (2023): 5,157
  - Density: 959/km^{2} (2,480/sq mi)
- Time zone: UTC+01:00 (CET)
  - Summer (DST): UTC+02:00 (CEST)
- INSEE/Postal code: 78224 /78620
- ^{1} French Land Register data, which excludes lakes, ponds, glaciers > 1 km^{2} (0.386 sq mi or 247 acres) and river estuaries.

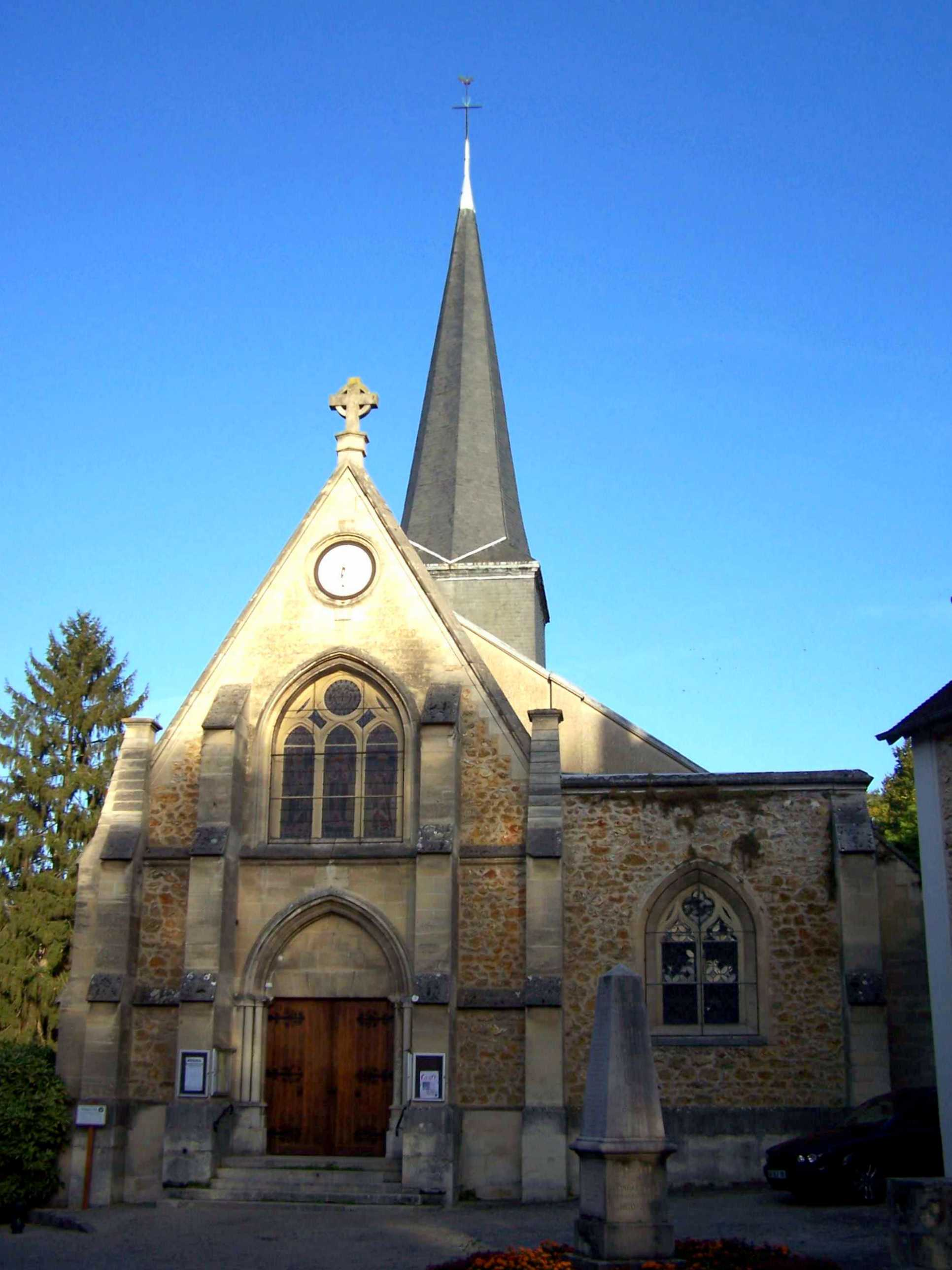
West entry to the church

L'Étang-la-Ville (French pronunciation: [letɑ̃ la vil]) is a commune in the Yvelines department in the Île-de-France in north-central France.

== Public transport ==
L'Étang-la-Ville is served by the T13 Express tram and the Transilien Line L train. There is an interchange station at Saint-Nom-la-Bretèche–Forêt de Marly, a train station at L'Étang-la-Ville and a tram station at L'Étang les Sablons. In addition there are several bus services, most notably a 6-day per week service to Saint-Germain-en-Laye. In addition to services terminating at the tram/train interchange there is a weekday inter-station service which connects L'Etang-les-Sablons with L'Étang-la-Ville via the town center.

== Geography ==
The commune is effectively surrounded on the north, south and west by the Forêt de Marly with a physical barrier formed by the railway lines of the St-Nom-la-Bretèche branch of the Transilien Line L and the Grande Ceinture Ouest.

Urban development of the forested area is effectively prohibited which prevents any further urban sprawl. Development of green spaces within the town or densification of existing development are the only avenues for further population growth.

== Population ==
Historical population
Year	Pop.	±% p.a.
1968	2,506	—
1975	4,321	+8.09%
1982	4,361	+0.13%
1990	4,567	+0.58%
1999	4,496	−0.17%
2007	4,777	+0.76%
2012	4,688	−0.38%
2017	4,437	−1.09%
2023	5,157	+2.54%
Source: INSEE

The inhabitants of L'Étang-la-Ville are called Stagnovillois in French. The average household income is €86,634. It is currently France's 23rd richest town income wise (revenus déclarés).

== Notable people ==
- Ker-Xavier Roussel lived in L'Étang-la-Ville

== See also ==
- Communes of the Yvelines department
