= Communauté d'agglomération Saint Germain Boucles de Seine =

Coordinates: 48.90°N 2.11°E

Saint Germain Boucles de Seine
- Communauté d'agglomération
- Country: France
- Region: Île-de-France
- Department: Val-d'Oise, Yvelines
- No. of communes: {{{nbcomm}}}
- Established: 2016
- Area: 139.1 km^{2} (53.7 sq mi)
- Population (2018): 335,109
  - Density: 2,409/km^{2} (6,240/sq mi)

The Communauté d'agglomération Saint Germain Boucles de Seine is the communauté d'agglomération, an intercommunal structure, in the western suburbs of Paris. It is located in the Yvelines and Val-d'Oise departments, in the Île-de-France region, northern France. It was created in January 2016. Its seat is in Le Pecq. Its area is 666.7 km^{2}. Its population was 335,109 in 2018.

== Composition ==
The communauté d'agglomération consists of the following 19 communes, of which one (Bezons) in the Val-d'Oise department:

1. Aigremont
2. Bezons
3. Carrières-sur-Seine
4. Chambourcy
5. Chatou
6. Croissy-sur-Seine
7. L'Étang-la-Ville
8. Houilles
9. Louveciennes
10. Maisons-Laffitte
11. Mareil-Marly
12. Marly-le-Roi
13. Le Mesnil-le-Roi
14. Montesson
15. Le Pecq
16. Le Port-Marly
17. Saint-Germain-en-Laye
18. Sartrouville
19. Le Vésinet
