= Marly-le-Roi station =

Railway station in France

Coordinates: 48°52′17″N 2°05′48″E

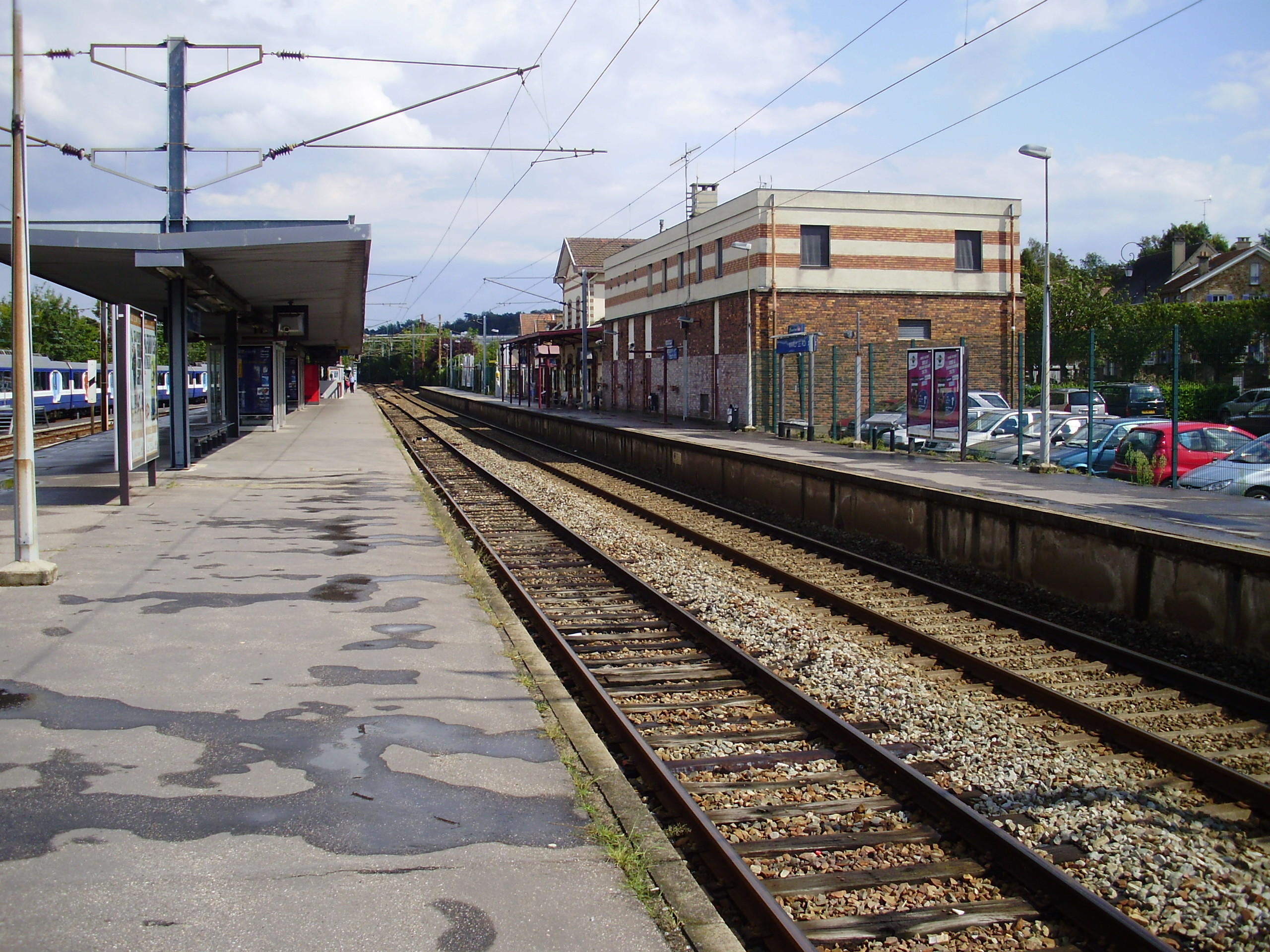
Marly-le-Roi station, Yvelines, France

Marly-le-Roi (French pronunciation: [maʁli lə ʁwa]) is a railway station in Marly-le-Roi, Yvelines, France. It lies on line L of Île-de-France's Transilien network.

| Preceding station | Transilien | Following station |
|---|---|---|
| L'Étang-la-Ville towards Saint-Nom-la-Bretèche | Line L | Louveciennes towards Paris–Saint Lazare |
