= Canton of Saint-Germain-en-Laye =

Administrative division of the Yvelines department, France

Coordinates: 48.90°N 2.09°E

The canton of Saint-Germain-en-Laye is an administrative division of the Yvelines department, northern France. It was created at the French canton reorganisation which came into effect in March 2015. Its seat is in Saint-Germain-en-Laye.

It consists of the following communes:

1. Aigremont
2. Chambourcy
3. L'Étang-la-Ville
4. Mareil-Marly
5. Le Pecq
6. Saint-Germain-en-Laye
