= Le Pecq =

- Commune
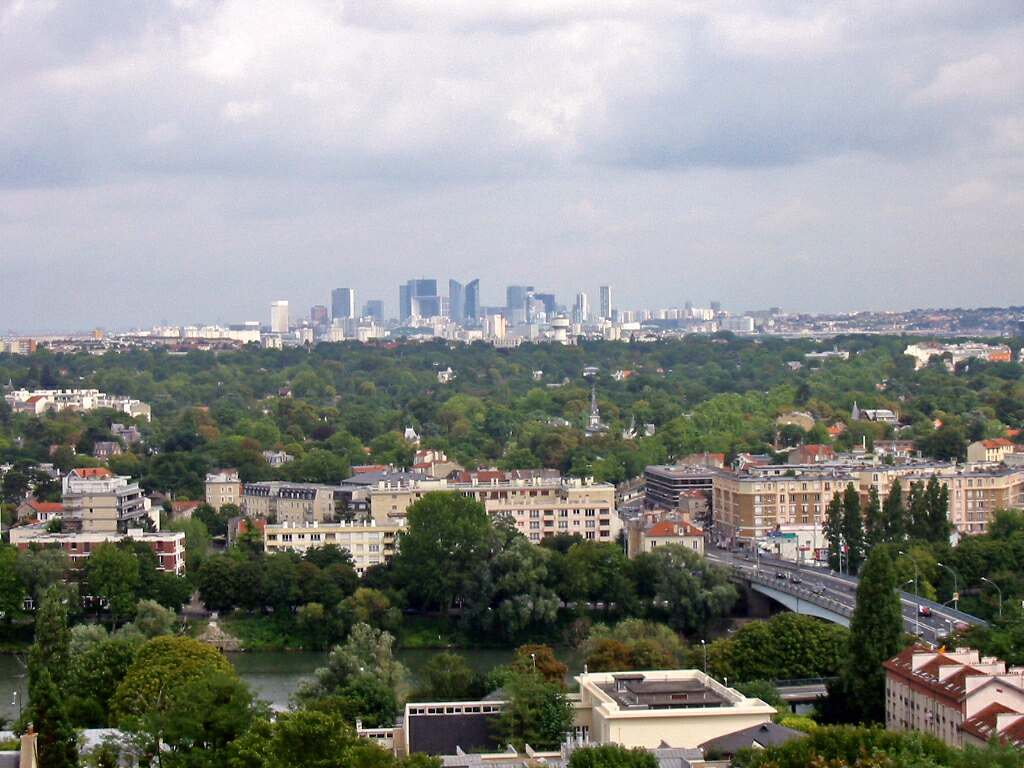
- Le Pecq seen from the Château de Saint-Germain-en-Laye, with La Défense in the distance

- Coat of arms

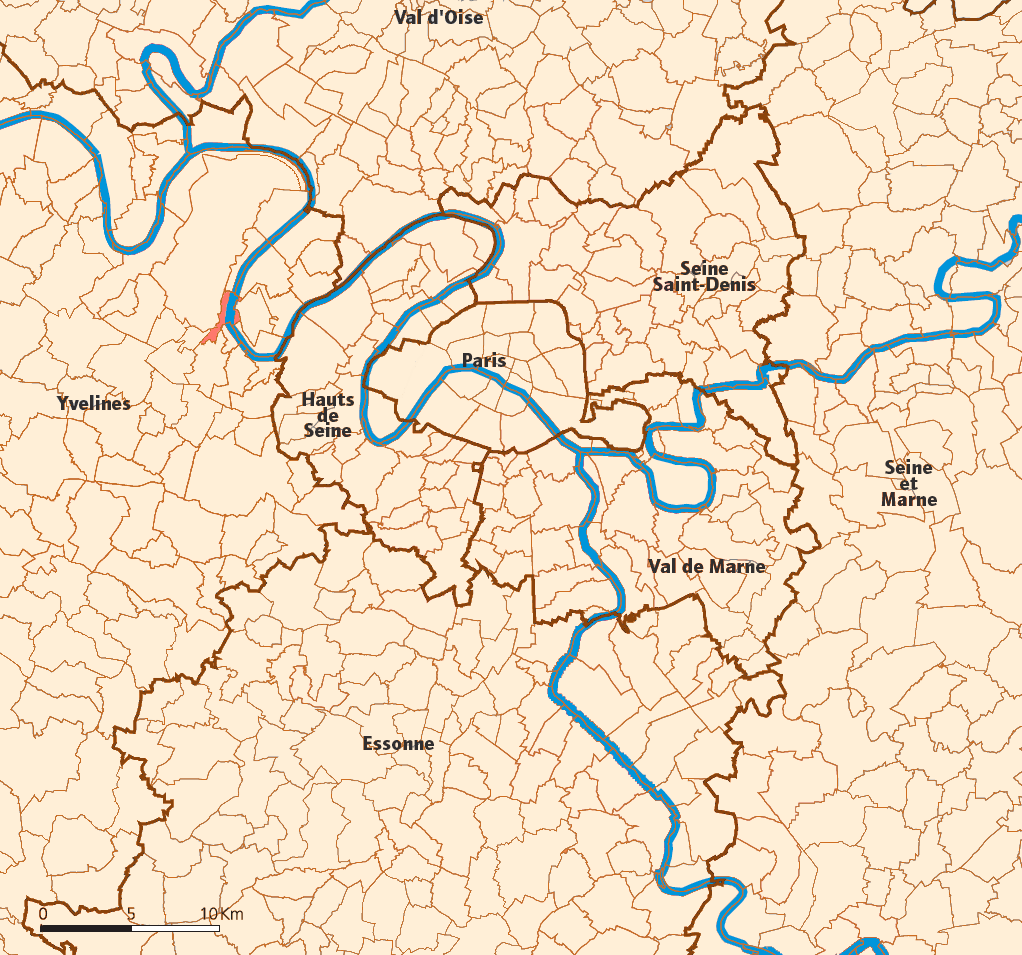
- Location (in red) within Paris inner and outer suburbs
- Location of Le Pecq
- Location within France Location within Île-de-France (region)
- Coordinates: 48°53′49″N 2°06′25″E
- Country: France
- Region: Île-de-France
- Department: Yvelines
- Arrondissement: Saint-Germain-en-Laye
- Canton: Saint-Germain-en-Laye
- Intercommunality: CA Saint Germain Boucles Seine

Government
  - Mayor (2020–2026): Laurence Bernard
- Area^{1}: 2.84 km^{2} (1.10 sq mi)
- Elevation: 67 m (220 ft)
- Highest elevation: 176 m (577 ft)
- Lowest elevation: 25 m (82 ft)
- Population (2023): 16,059
  - Density: 5,650/km^{2} (14,600/sq mi)
- Time zone: UTC+01:00 (CET)
  - Summer (DST): UTC+02:00 (CEST)
- INSEE/Postal code: 78481 /78230
- ^{1} French Land Register data, which excludes lakes, ponds, glaciers > 1 km^{2} (0.386 sq mi or 247 acres) and river estuaries.

Le Pecq (French pronunciation: [l(ə) pɛk]) is a commune in the Yvelines department in the Île-de-France region in north-central France. It is located in the western suburbs of Paris, 18.4 km (11.4 mi) from the centre of Paris.

== Geography ==
The commune of Le Pecq is located in a loop of the Seine river, 19 km (12 mi) west of Paris, at the foot of the chateau of Saint-Germain-en-Laye.

Le Pecq's territory is astride the two banks of the Seine and includes a small island, Corbière. It is highly urbanized except for Corbière island, which is partially protected as a nesting zone for migratory birds. Until after the Second World War, there were swimming baths on the island. Le Pecq was famous for two other establishments related to water: a spa exploiting springs on St-Germain hill and a natural water swimming pool which was 100 metres long with sand beaches.

It borders the communes of Saint-Germain-en-Laye and Mareil-Marly in the west, Montesson and Le Mesnil-le-Roi (Carrières-sous-Bois district) to the north, Croissy-sur-Seine and Le Vésinet in the east and Marly-le-Roi and Le Port-Marly to the south.

== History ==
The first mention of Le Pecq came in 704. In that year, the Merovingian king Childebert III granted a charter to Fontenelle Abbey which included territory in Aupec - the modern Le Pecq.

On 31 May 1875, a part of Le Pecq was detached and merged with parts of Chatou and Croissy-sur-Seine to create the commune of Le Vésinet.

== Population ==
Historical population
Year	Pop.	±% p.a.
1968	13,734	—
1975	17,584	+3.59%
1982	17,196	−0.32%
1990	17,006	−0.14%
1999	16,318	−0.46%
2007	15,935	−0.30%
2012	16,350	+0.52%
2017	16,072	−0.34%
2023	16,059	−0.01%
Source: INSEE

== Economy ==
- Regional center of the "Lyonnaise des Eaux", water company which produces approximately 90 million cubic meters of drinking water per year, serving approximately 500 000 consumers in the west of Paris.
- Home of the Yacht Club of Le Pecq

== Monuments ==
- Saint-Wandrille church: the current church, with triangular pediment, was built by the architect Sebastien Jan in 1739 on the site of an old church.
- Saint-Thibault church: built of concrete and wooden in 1964 by the architects Perrouin, Lunel and Jung, surmounted by an arrow in wood veil 30 height meters.
- Railway viaduct: work dating from 1847, with iron bridges (later replaced by steel) over the two channels of the Seine, and on the left bank a viaduct of twenty stone arches leading to a tunnel into the cliff at Saint-Germaine-en-Laye, in use for RER A.

== People ==
- Jacques Tati, born in Le Pecq on October 9, 1908, mime artist, cinema director and actor.

== Politics ==
The town in Le Pecq is notable for being the town of residence of Alain Gournac: Senator of the Yvelines for the Union pour un Mouvement Populaire (UMP) since 1995. A. Gournac also occupied the function of Mayor of the town between 1991 and 2013, year in which, following legislature forbidding Senators from also holding the title of Mayor, he was made to resign, leaving his seat to Laurence Bernard, also a member of the UMP.

== Transport ==
The main transportation links in Le Pecq are the N13 which runs on the left bank of the Seine and secondary road D 186 connecting Saint-Germain-en-Laye with Paris which crosses the Seine at the Le Pecq bridge. This bridge was built in 1963. It has of flattened steel arches resting on two central concrete piers.

Le Pecq is not served by the Paris Métro, RER, or suburban rail network. The closest station to Le Pecq is Le Vésinet – Le Pecq station on Paris RER line A. This station is located in the neighboring commune of Le Vésinet, 1.2 km (0.75 mi) from the town center of Le Pecq.

== Twin towns – sister cities ==
Town	State/Region	Country
Aranjuez	Community of Madrid	Spain
Barnes	London Borough of Richmond upon Thames	UK
Hennef	North Rhine-Westphalia	Germany

== See also ==
- Communes of the Yvelines department
