= Mareil-Marly =

- Commune
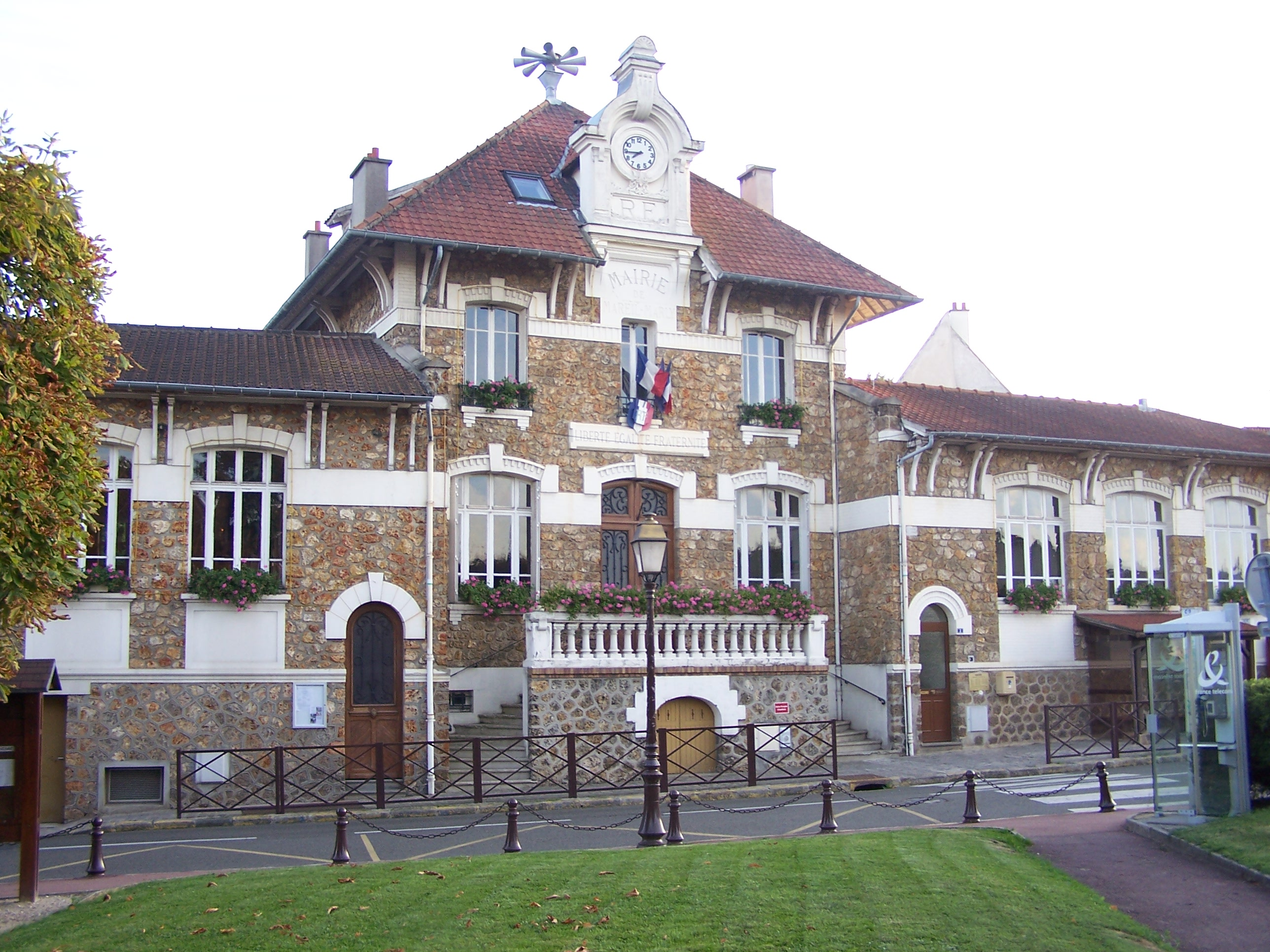
- Town hall

- Coat of arms
- Location of Mareil-Marly
- Location within France Location within Île-de-France (region)
- Coordinates: 48°52′57″N 2°04′39″E
- Country: France
- Region: Île-de-France
- Department: Yvelines
- Arrondissement: Saint-Germain-en-Laye
- Canton: Saint-Germain-en-Laye
- Intercommunality: CA Saint Germain Boucles Seine

Government
  - Mayor (2020–2026): Dominique Lafon
- Area^{1}: 1.77 km^{2} (0.68 sq mi)
- Elevation: 120 m (390 ft)
- Highest elevation: 161 m (528 ft)
- Lowest elevation: 42 m (138 ft)
- Population (2023): 4,141
  - Density: 2,340/km^{2} (6,060/sq mi)
- Time zone: UTC+01:00 (CET)
  - Summer (DST): UTC+02:00 (CEST)
- INSEE/Postal code: 78367 /78750
- ^{1} French Land Register data, which excludes lakes, ponds, glaciers > 1 km^{2} (0.386 sq mi or 247 acres) and river estuaries.

Mareil-Marly (French pronunciation: [maʁɛj maʁli]) is a commune in the Yvelines department in the Île-de-France region in north-central France.

== Population ==
Historical population
Year	Pop.	±% p.a.
1968	1,757	—
1975	2,542	+5.42%
1982	3,054	+2.66%
1990	3,074	+0.08%
1999	3,180	+0.38%
2007	3,468	+1.09%
2012	3,519	+0.29%
2017	3,448	−0.41%
2023	4,141	+3.10%
Source: INSEE

== Transportation ==
The train station was built in 1882 on the Grande Ceinture line. Since 2022, it is served by Île-de-France tramway Line 13 Express between Saint-Germain-en-Laye and Saint-Cyr-l'École.

== See also ==
- Communes of the Yvelines department
