= Aigremont, Yvelines =

Aigremont
- Commune
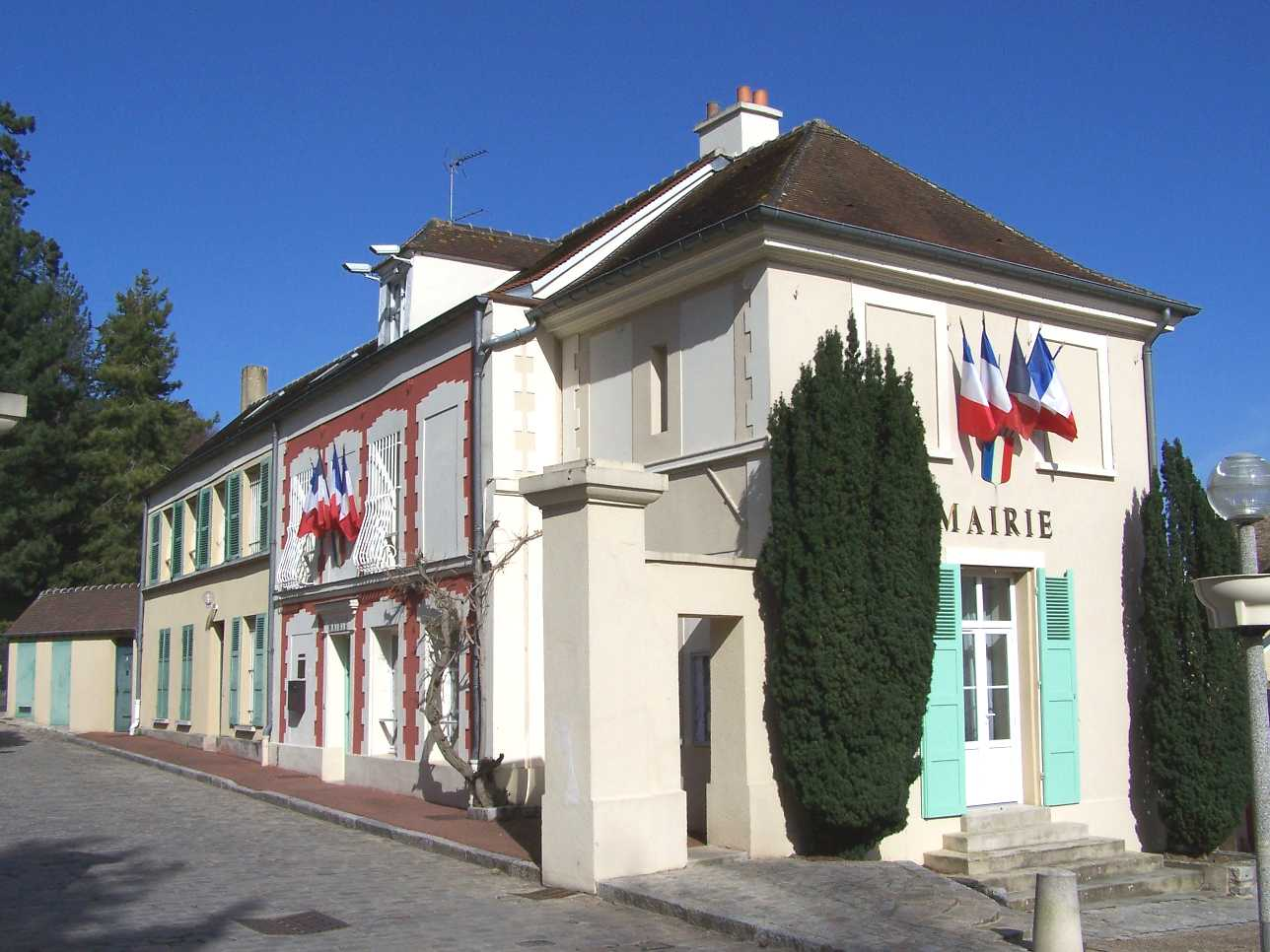
- Hôtel de ville

- Coat of arms
- Location of Aigremont
- Location within France Location within Île-de-France (region)
- Coordinates: 48°54′N 2°01′E
- Country: France
- Region: Île-de-France
- Department: Yvelines
- Arrondissement: Saint-Germain-en-Laye
- Canton: Saint-Germain-en-Laye
- Intercommunality: Saint Germain Boucles Seine

Government
  - Mayor (2020–2026): Samuel Benoudiz
- Area^{1}: 4.00 km^{2} (1.54 sq mi)
- Elevation: 120 m (390 ft)
- Highest elevation: 168 m (551 ft)
- Lowest elevation: 69 m (226 ft)
- Population (2023): 1,075
  - Density: 269/km^{2} (696/sq mi)
- Time zone: UTC+01:00 (CET)
  - Summer (DST): UTC+02:00 (CEST)
- INSEE/Postal code: 78007 /78240
- ^{1} French Land Register data, which excludes lakes, ponds, glaciers > 1 km^{2} (0.386 sq mi or 247 acres) and river estuaries.

Aigremont (French pronunciation: [ɛɡʁəmɔ̃]) is a commune in the Yvelines department in north-central France.

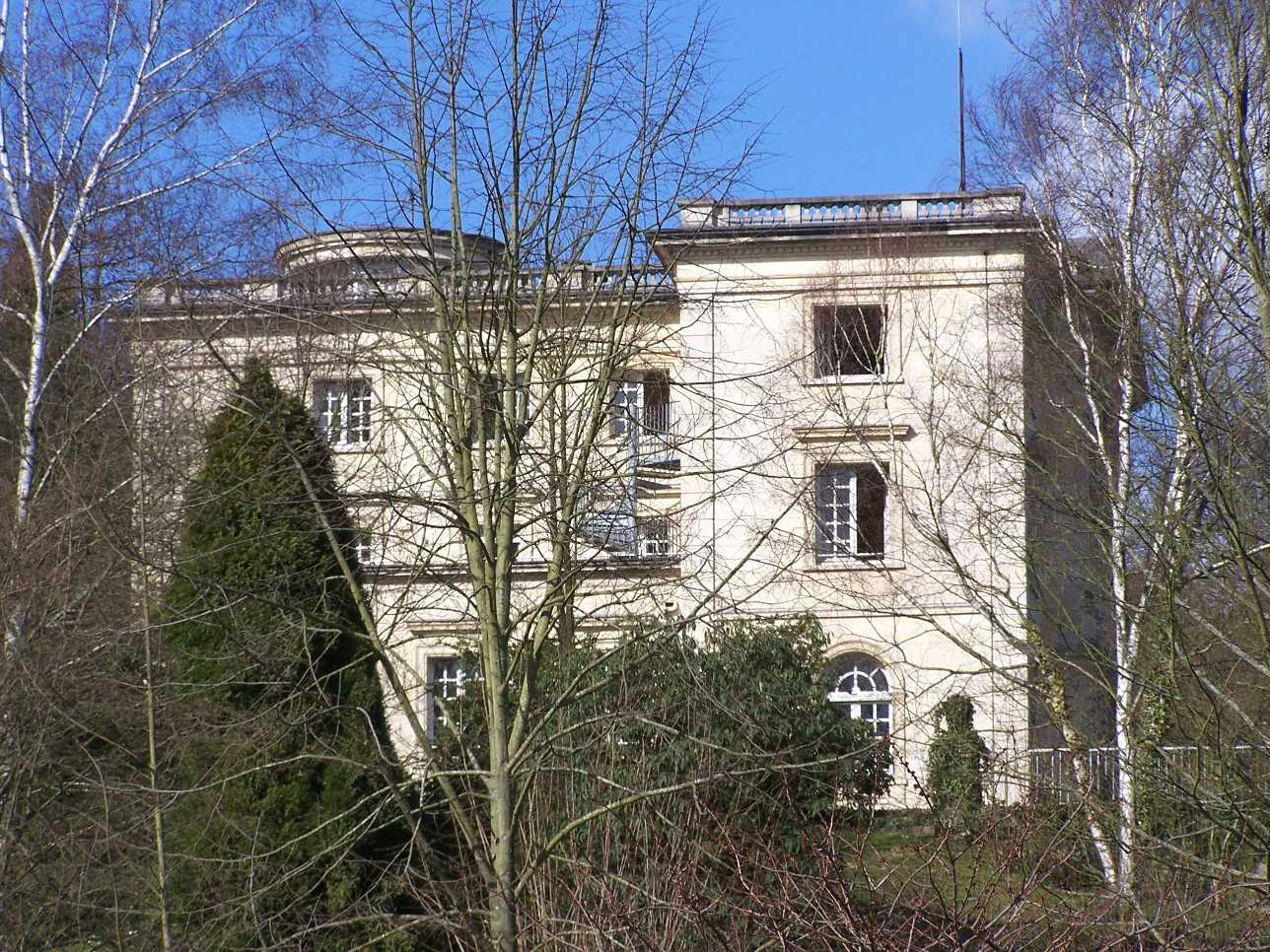
Chateau of Aigremont

== Population ==
Historical population
Year	Pop.	±% p.a.
1968	262	—
1975	406	+6.46%
1982	864	+11.39%
1990	914	+0.71%
1999	873	−0.51%
2007	1,075	+2.64%
2012	1,120	+0.82%
2017	1,084	−0.65%
2023	1,075	−0.14%
Source: INSEE

== See also ==
- Communes of the Yvelines department
