= Montesson =

- Commune
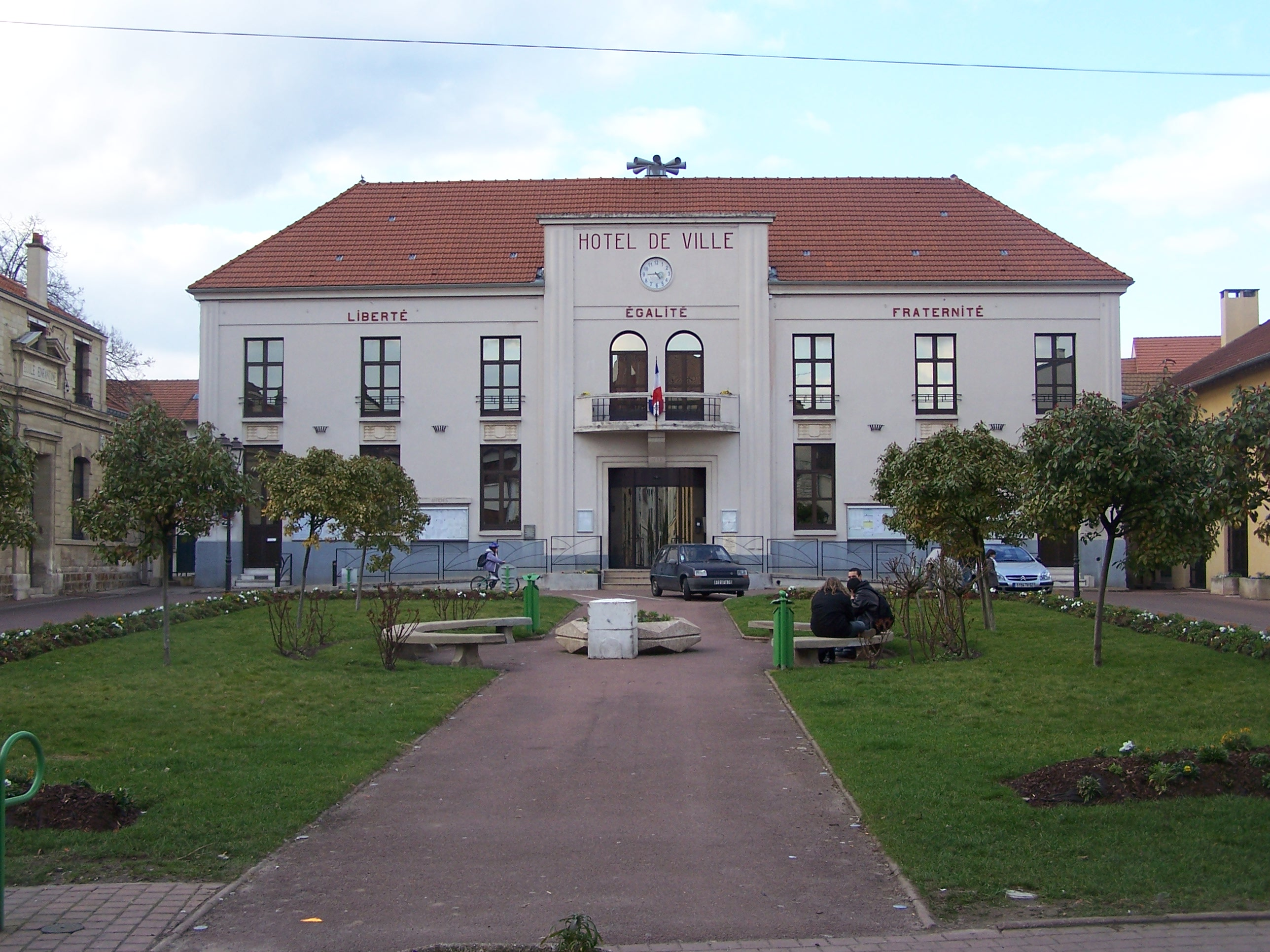
- The town hall in Montesson

- Coat of arms
- Location of Montesson
- Location within France Location within Île-de-France (region)
- Coordinates: 48°54′31″N 2°08′59″E
- Country: France
- Region: Île-de-France
- Department: Yvelines
- Arrondissement: Saint-Germain-en-Laye
- Canton: Houilles
- Intercommunality: CA Saint Germain Boucles Seine

Government
  - Mayor (2020–2026): Nicole Bristol
- Area^{1}: 7.36 km^{2} (2.84 sq mi)
- Elevation: 45 m (148 ft)
- Highest elevation: 56 m (184 ft)
- Lowest elevation: 23 m (75 ft)
- Population (2023): 14,549
  - Density: 1,980/km^{2} (5,120/sq mi)
- Time zone: UTC+01:00 (CET)
  - Summer (DST): UTC+02:00 (CEST)
- INSEE/Postal code: 78418 /78360
- ^{1} French Land Register data, which excludes lakes, ponds, glaciers > 1 km^{2} (0.386 sq mi or 247 acres) and river estuaries.

Montesson (French pronunciation: [mɔ̃tesɔ̃]) is a commune in the Yvelines department in the Île-de-France region in north-central France. It is located in the western suburbs of Paris.

Transport in Montesson is served by buses with T-tickets as well as by several Paris-suburban lines: Line 01, Line 04, Line 07, Line 19, Line 22. The bus tickets have a category called "Bus T" which is for occasional users and replaces the old tickets in the notebooks of the previous bus network. The T ticket is also valid on the entire metro (Paris and suburbs) on the RER lines of the RATP and the SNCF. It is sold for a single price of 1.70 € for a journey or 12.50 € for a book of 10. It can be purchased all around the Île-de-France metro stations, RER stations, bus terminals, and RATP authorized dealers.

== Population ==
Historical population
Year	Pop.	±% p.a.
1968	9,353	—
1975	9,494	+0.21%
1982	11,192	+2.38%
1990	12,365	+1.25%
1999	13,750	+1.19%
2007	14,885	+1.00%
2012	15,280	+0.53%
2017	15,019	−0.34%
2023	14,549	−0.53%
Source: INSEE

== See also ==
- Communes of the Yvelines department
