= Lycée International de Saint-Germain-en-Laye =

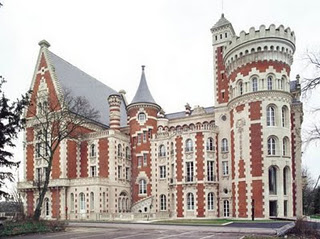
- Saint-Germain-en-Laye, 78100; France

Information
- Other names: Lycée International; L.I.
- Type: Public international school
- Established: 1952
- Headmaster: Philippe Bonneville
- Gender: Co-educational
- Age range: 4-18
- Campus size: Large
- Website: lycee-international-stgermain.com

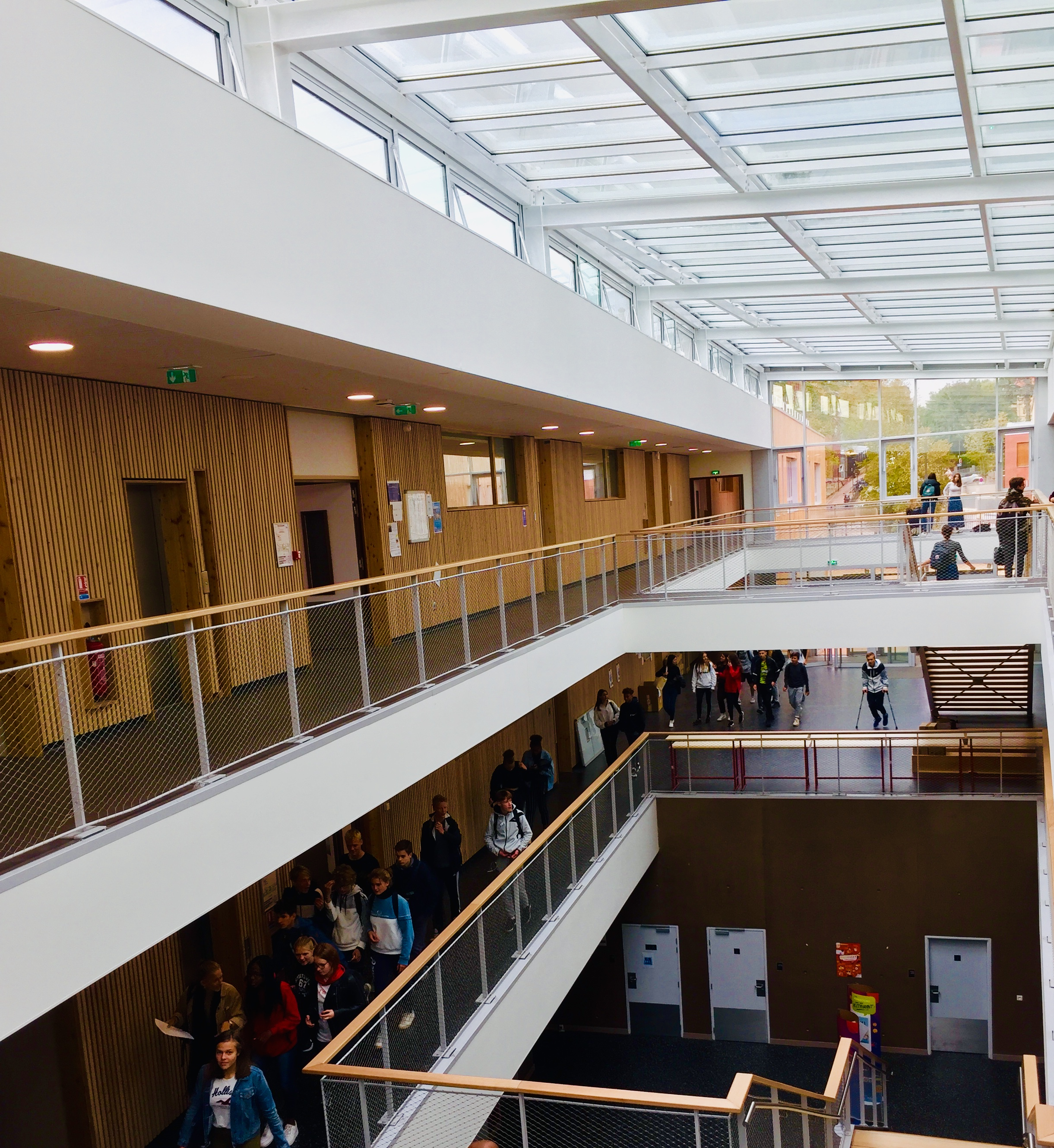
Lycée International interior

The Lycée International de Saint-Germain-en-Laye (more commonly, Lycée International or L.I.; English: International High School of Saint-Germain-en-Laye) is a French public school located in Saint-Germain-en-Laye, Yvelines, in the western suburbs of Paris, France. Established in 1952 as a school for the children of international personnel working at Supreme Headquarters Allied Powers Europe (SHAPE) in nearby Rocquencourt, the Lycée International caters to students with international and multilingual backgrounds.

Students at the Lycée International are taught in one of the school's fourteen national sections according to their language spoken: American Section or British Section for English, and Chinese, Danish, Dutch, German, Italian, Japanese, Norwegian, Polish, Portuguese, Russian, Spanish, and Swedish. They are not required to be fluent in French to be admitted, as there is a special one-year Français Spécial language program. The academic curriculum of the international sections supplements the standard French curriculum with additional courses in literature/language and history/geography, taught in the language of the students' respective national sections, allowing them to pursue the Baccalauréat Français International (BFI), the international variant of the French baccalauréat.

The school's main site in Saint-Germain-en-Laye contains a preschool (maternelle), a primary school (école élémentaire), a middle school (collège), and an upper school (lycée). Due to the size of the student body, some primary students enroll as externé students, on a part-time basis, for example two half-days per week. Some larger national sections have classes for primary and middle school grades at nearby partner schools in Saint-Germain-en-Laye and Le Pecq. All students return to the main campus for their final three (lycée-level) years.

With a typical success rate of 99.9 to 100 percent on the French baccalauréat, the Lycée International consistently ranks among France's top schools and is considered to be the country's best public international school.

== History ==
=== 1951–1965 ===
In 1951, the recently established North Atlantic Treaty Organisation (NATO), a grouping of 15 countries, created Supreme Headquarters Allied Powers Europe (SHAPE) with the aim of ensuring peace and security in the North Atlantic region and promising European members the support of the United States in the event of any future aggression.

SHAPE was installed at Rocquencourt, and Saint Germain-en-Laye was chosen as the place of residence for the serving officers and their families. The SHAPE Village Project was built in the grounds of the Chateau d'Hennemont to accommodate 1,500 officers and soldiers from 13 nationalities, and their families. SHAPE Supreme Commander General Dwight D. Eisenhower decided to create a school for the children of the officers, which he hoped would help SHAPE's multi-national families to live and work together in harmony.

The SHAPE village school opened in January 1952, under the direction of René Tallard. By the end of the school year, 400 children were on the register, including 200 French children, half of them inhabitants of the town. Two years later, in 1954, the school was officially renamed the NATO International School (l’École Internationale de l’OTAN).

Funding from SHAPE provided the school with equipment and accommodation, including a new flagship building completed in 1960. From 1961, senior students prepared for the Diplôme des Ecoles Internationales and the following year, the school was renamed the NATO International Lycée (Lycée International de l’OTAN). The founding proviseur, René Tallard, retired in 1965.

=== 1965–1989 ===
In 1965, René Tallard retired, and President Charles de Gaulle announced France's withdrawal from NATO's integrated military command structure. As NATO and SHAPE relocated their European base to Belgium, the Lycée International de l’OTAN lost a significant portion of its students. The new proviseur, Edgar Scherer, worked with the remaining German and Dutch sections to help maintain the school's operations and encourage support from educational authorities in France and abroad. The school subsequently relied increasingly on "economic expatriates" to replace students from the former military community.

By 1968, under Scherer’s leadership and direction, the school was building up strength with six sections – German, Dutch, British, American, Danish and Italian.

=== 1989–present ===
Scherer’s successor, Jean-Pierre Maillard, had a different challenge: modernising the infrastructure of a school, which had been expanding again over more than twenty years. Replacing pre-fabricated buildings with more lasting structures was now a priority.

Thanks to state funding, the result was a new campus, including a fine new primary building. Under Maillard, other projects advanced too: the development of the network of partner schools, the drafting of a "projet d’établissement", the creation of the Japanese section in 1993; the embracing of the Option Internationale du Baccalauréat as the final exam for senior Lycée students, and the renovation of the chateau.

In 1997, Maillard handed the baton on to Patrick Charpeil, who focused attention on the administrative complexities of the school, clarifying the legal basis of the Lycée and its component parts. Charpeil continued to oversee the restoration of the chateau and successfully liaised and lobbied with the supervising educational authorities to advance important projects concerning security, major improvements and maintenance.

Yves Lemaire took over the helm in September 2001 until September 2012. The challenges were as stimulating as ever: the final stages of renovation and the future use of the chateau; the pressure for increasing the number of classes at Lycée level; nationwide administration of the OIB; the creation of the Polish section at Collège and Lycée level (in 2002/3) and the consolidation of the legal status of the school via a new decree.

His successor, Joel Bianco officially took office as the new proviseur in September 2012. He directed the lycée from 2012 to 2016, integrating the Chinese Section. Isabelle Negral was proviseur from 2016 to 2019. She oversaw a major renovation, which included the creation of new secondary buildings, a new preschool building, and a gymnasium, as well as the renovation of the Agora, which will host the CDI, the Maison des Lycéens, meeting rooms, and a center for the arts. France Bessis became proviseur of the school in 2019. Philippe Bonneville became proviseur in 2023.

== Academics ==
The curriculum at the Lycée International combines the French national curriculum with the curriculum of one of the national sections. French Education National teachers teach subjects to French national standards and the school's foreign teachers – employed in one of the system’s fourteen national sections – are given the freedom and responsibility to teach literature, language and history to their own national standards. These additional classes in the national sections provide (on a weekly basis):

- Six hours of language class in the primary school
- Six hours in the middles school, including four hours of literature/language and two hours of history
- Eight hours in the upper school, usually divided into four hours of literature/language and four hours of history/geography**

(**American Section students have five hours of literature/language and three hours of history/geography, as do Polish Section students. Japanese Section students have six hours of literature/language and two hours of history/geography. Chinese section students take math courses during section time instead of history.)

Since the French curriculum requires learning at least two foreign language, many students who graduate from the Lycée International are fluent in four languages.

Students who do not speak French are placed in a French immersion program called Français Spécial. After one year, they are expected to be fluent in French and integrate the standard French curriculum along with the rest of the student population.

Lycée International students must take the international variation on the baccalauréat, called the BFI (Baccalauréat Français International), in order to take advantage of their language skills. Baccalaureat results at the Lycée International de Saint Germain-en-Laye fluctuate between 99% and 100%, and an honors (mention) rate which is above 90%. These figures are used to compile rankings by national news outlets. While each news outlet has its own ranking system, in all the Lycée International consistently figures among the top ten in France.

Every year many Lycée International students present the Concours Général. It is ranked 4th in the country for the cumulative number of winners.

Number of Concours Général laureates
	2006	2007	2008	2009	2010	2011	2012	2013	2014	2015	2016	2017	2018	2019
Number of laureates	7	5	8	6	6	9	10	7	9	11	8	6	7	6

== International Sections ==
The school has fourteen national sections which are essentially run as schools within the school. Students are taught the relevant national curriculum alongside the standard French curriculum. Foreign teachers in each of the national sections give the students lessons in literature, geography and history (from six to eight hours a week according to the grade) in their native tongue. All other disciplines of the official program are taught in French, by French Ministry of Education teachers.

- British Section Est. 1952, approx. 850 students

Based at the Lycée International site and across partner sites located in Saint-Germain-en-Laye and Le Pecq including Ecole Jean Alain, Ecole Félix Eboué, College Pierre and Marie Curie and College Hauts Grillets.
British Section classes provide an authentic British educational programme, as part of a bilingual curriculum, delivered within the framework of the French education system. Teachers are UK qualified and have teaching experience in the UK.
Anglophone children and children learning English as a second language are prepared for the iGCSE in English language. The Baccaularet Français International exam (BFI) examines students at a standard equivalent to "A level". The British Section is affiliated to ASIBA (Association des Sections Internationales Britanniques et Anglophones), Cambridge Assessment International Education and Edexcel.
Pupils are equipped to continue their education and professional lives, in the UK or another anglophone country. All go on to higher education, with most students going on to read for degrees at leading universities in the UK and France, or Netherlands, USA, Ireland or Canada.

- American Section Est. 1952, approx. 700 students

There are some 700 students enrolled in the American Section, at three different campuses, ranging from Pre-K (MS) through twelfth grade (Terminale). Over 50 nationalities are represented in the American Section student body, though the majority of students hold both French and American nationalities or are French citizens who spent considerable time abroad in English language schools. The common denominator is that all American Section students speak age-appropriate fluent English and are motivated to learn in a demanding bilingual and bicultural environment.
The American Section provides an American education.
The Ecole Schnapper and the Collège Marcel Roby, also located in St. Germain en Laye, are American Section partner schools. Approximately 65 students in grades K-5 (CP-CM2) attend the Ecole Schnapper, and 160 students in grades 6-9 (6ème-3ème) the Collège Marcel Roby. Students enrolled in these two schools receive the same American Section education as their peers on the Lycée International campus.

== International Cultural Life ==
Parent associations organize numerous events which bring together the school's fourteen international sections:

- Late August: Welcome Day/Open House;
- End of November/early December: Festive Sale including traditional crafts, foods and drinks;
- Late December/early January: Jobs and Studies Fair, with over 200 participants;
- March: Talent Show for students and parents;
- Mid May: Tournoi des Étoiles international soccer tournament
- End May: Lycée en Fête with market stalls and food and drink stands from across the sections, plus artistic performances, games and activities for children.
- Early July: BFI Graduation Ceremony

Each section celebrates many events linked to their own culture and history, such as the British Section Quiz Night, Scandinavian sections' festival of lights, the Japanese spring celebration, the American Section's potluck dinner and bingo night. Most sections also have theatre programs and other extra-curricular activities for students, and some organise welcome events for new families at the start of the new school year in early September.

The foyer socio-éducatif (FSE) organizes student concerts (Jazz Band, classical orchestra, a-capella singing, choir) and theater performances.

== Tuition and Fees ==
Tuition and fees vary by section: some are private and others are public. In the American section, one of the most expensive ones, in addition to registration and application fees that are around 1,200 euros, families are required to pay annual tuition of 4,290 euros for grades pre-K to middle school, up to 5,670 euros for high school. These prices increase if businesses are paying for tuition, but they decrease if there are multiple children enrolled in a section.

== Gallery ==
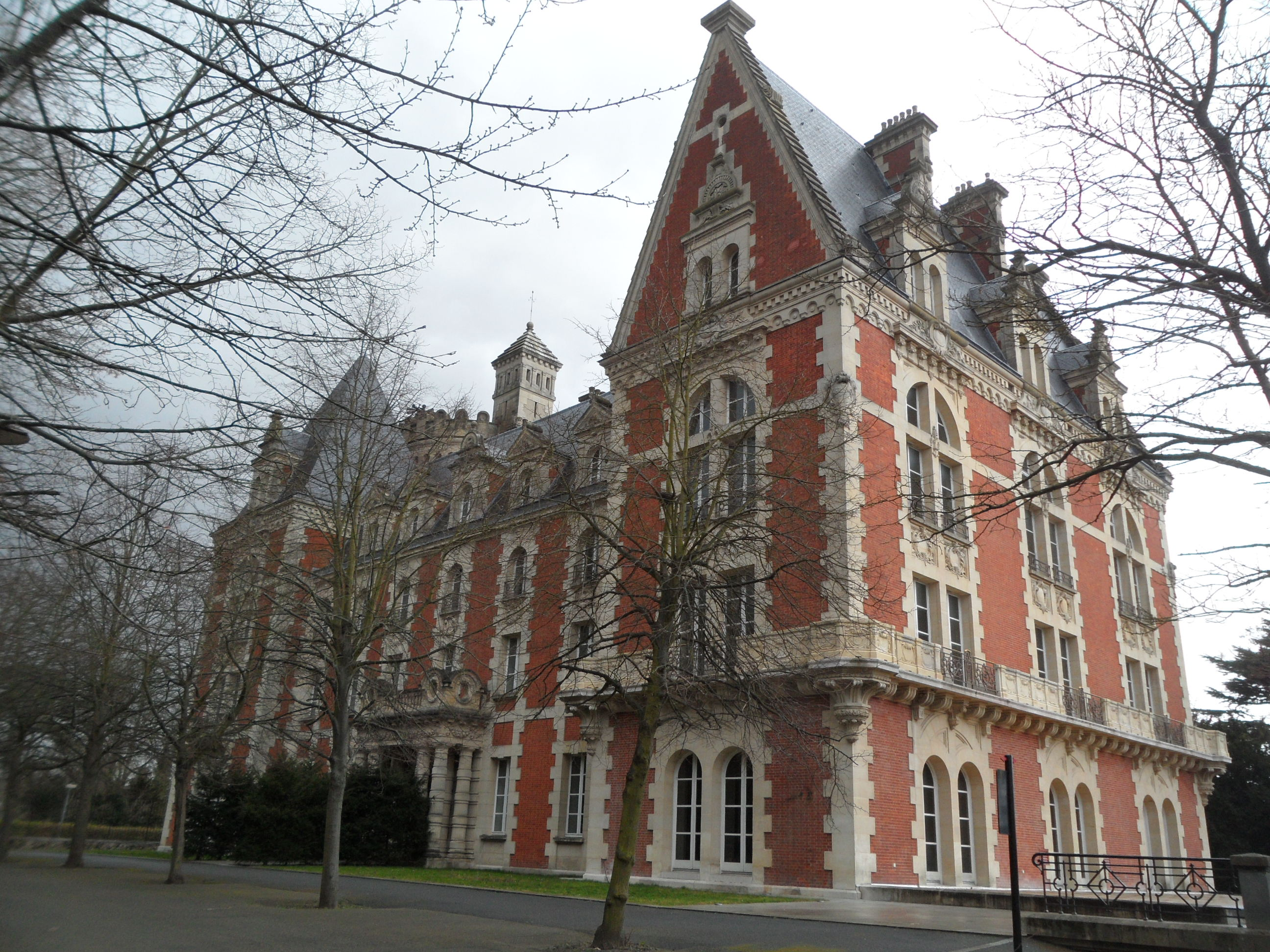
Façade of the Château d'Hennemont

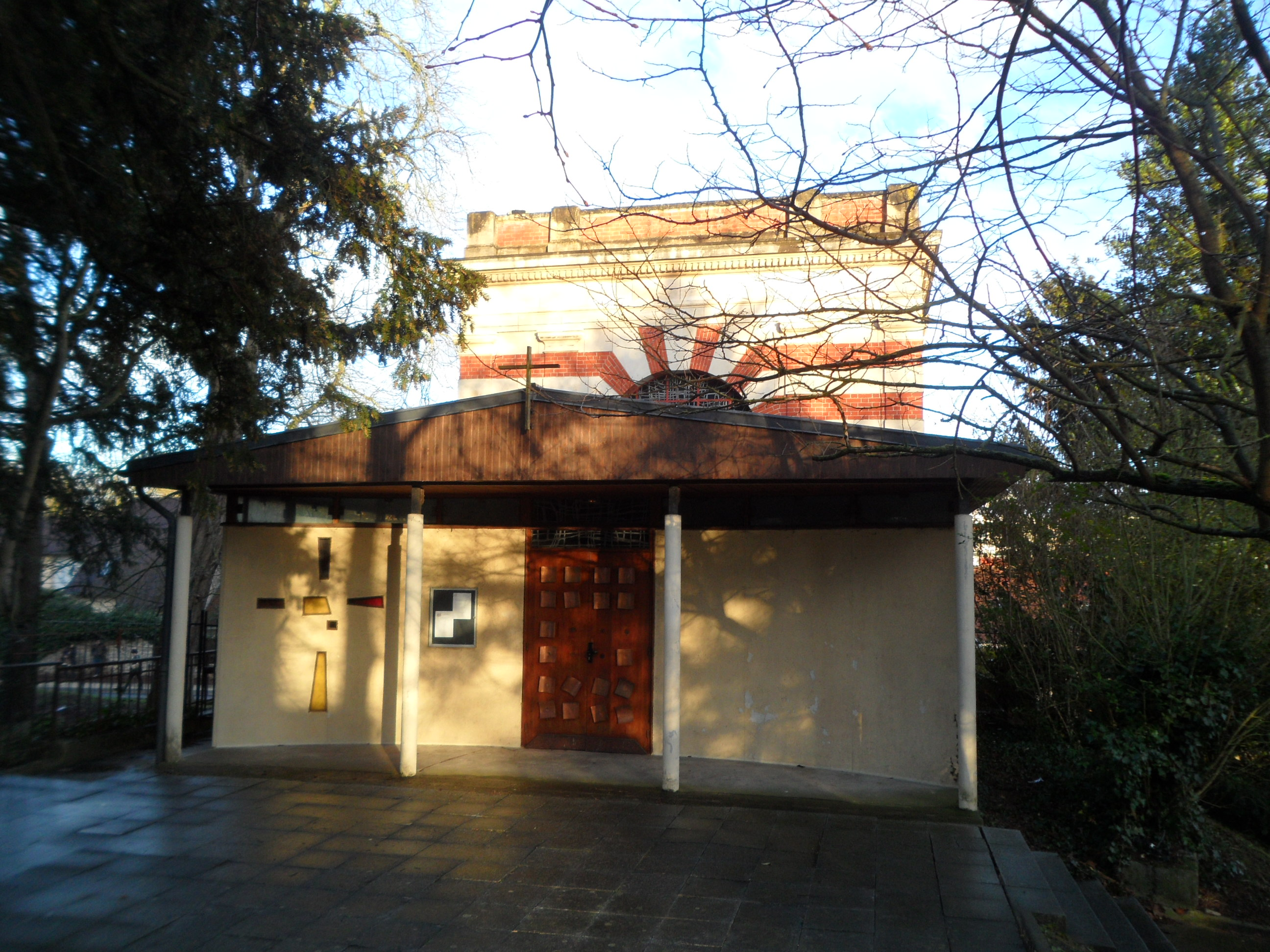
Chapel

== See also ==
- Collège Marcel Roby
