= Two Sisters (On the Terrace) =

Painting by Pierre-Auguste Renoir

- Les Deux Sœurs (Sur la terrasse) (French)
- Two Sisters (On the Terrace) (1881)
- Artist: Pierre-Auguste Renoir
- Year: 1881
- Medium: Oil on canvas
- Dimensions: 100.5 cm × 81 cm (39.6 in × 31.9 in)
- Location: Art Institute of Chicago

Two Sisters (On the Terrace) is an 1881 oil-on-canvas painting by French artist Pierre-Auguste Renoir in the collection of the Art Institute of Chicago. The dimensions of the painting are 100.5 cm × 81 cm. The title Two Sisters (French: Les Deux Sœurs) was given to the painting by Renoir, and the title On the Terrace (French: Sur la terrasse) by its first owner Paul Durand-Ruel.

Renoir worked on the painting on the terrace of the Maison Fournaise, a restaurant located on an island in the Seine in Chatou, the western suburb of Paris. The painting depicts a young woman and her younger sister seated outdoors with a small basket containing balls of wool. Over the railings of the terrace one can see shrubbery and foliage with the River Seine behind it.

In 1880 to 1881, shortly before working on Two Sisters, Renoir worked in this particular location on another well-known painting, Luncheon of the Boating Party.

Jeanne Darlot (1863—1914), a future actress who was 18 years old at the time, was posing as "the elder sister." It is unknown who posed as the "younger sister," but it is stated that the models were not actually related.

Renoir began work on the painting in April 1881 and on July 7, 1881, it was bought by the art dealer, Paul Durand-Ruel, for 1,500 francs. The painting was presented for the first time to the public at the 7th Impressionist exhibition in the spring of 1882. In 1883 it was known to be in the collection of Charles Ephrussi, an art collector and a publisher, but in 1892 the painting was returned again to the collection of the Durand-Ruel family.

In 1925, the painting was sold to Annie Swan Coburn from Chicago for $100,000. After her death in 1932 the painting was bequeathed to the Art Institute of Chicago, where it has remained since 1933.

== See also ==
- List of paintings by Pierre-Auguste Renoir
