= Fournaise =

Fournaise may refer to:

- Piton de la Fournaise, a volcano on the island of Reunion
- Maison Fournaise, a restaurant and museum near Paris, France, original proprietor Alphonse Fournaise
  - Lunch at the Restaurant Fournaise, a Renoir painting
