= MACS MTO =

Museum in Chatou, France dedicated to Sufism

- Musée d'Art et de Culture Soufis
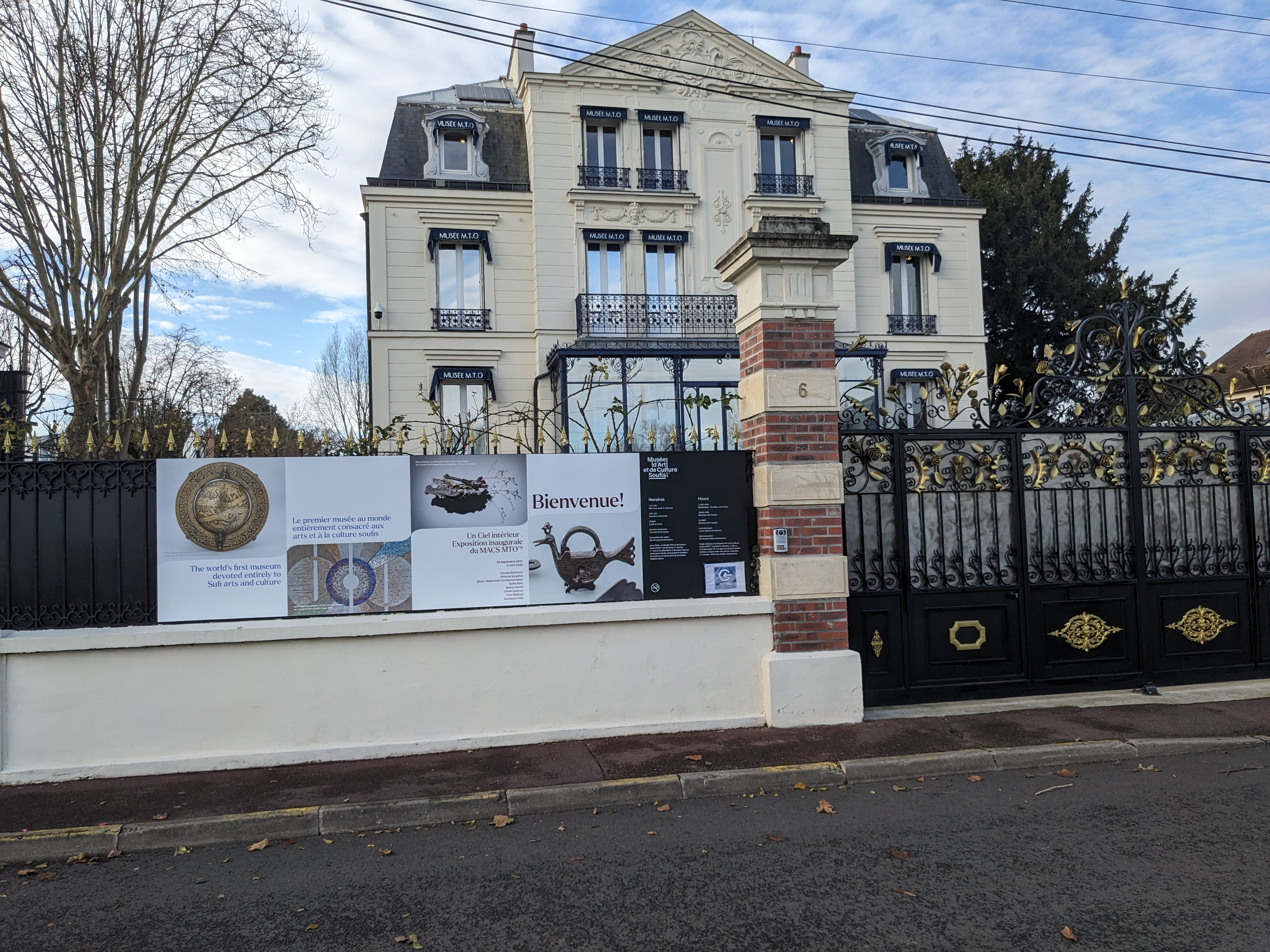
- Established: 28 September 2024
- Location: 6, avenue des Tilleuls, 78400 Chatou, France
- Coordinates: 48.883296°N 2.156761°E
- Collections: 300 objects and artworks related to Sufi history and culture, including music and calligraphy
- Director: Parastou Youseffi
- Website: www.macsmto.fr/en/

The MACS MTO (French: MACS : Musée d'Art et de Culture Soufis, lit. 'Museum of Sufi Art and Culture') is located in Chatou, Yvelines, and is the world's first museum dedicated to Sufism. The museum opened to the public in September 2024.

MTO Shahmaghsoudi School of Islamic Sufism, an international non-profit organization, initiated the Museum Project. The Museum is housed in a 19th-century French urban mansion overlooking the Seine, with an on-site garden, and houses a rotating permanent collection and temporary exhibitions.

== History and Purpose ==
The Museum represents the culmination of a project spanning more than 10 years. While its conception dates back to the 1970s, the Museum was officially inaugurated on 28 September 2024. The site for the Museum was acquired in 2010 by MTO Shahmaghsoudi School of Islamic Sufism, which initiated and supported the project. After completing renovations, the Museum held an informal open house event and tour for residents and officials of Chatou in 2019. It held a formal pre-opening event in the Museum's garden in 2023 for European Heritage Days, while the museum's programming and exhibition were still being planned.

The institution aims to be a place of cultural exchange rather than a place of worship, proselytism or teaching. As Eric Deplont, former head of the Institut du Monde Arabe, and member of MACS MTO's board and Scientific Council, notes, "Even on a small scale, this museum can promote interreligious dialogue by providing an understanding of the history of this branch of Islam".

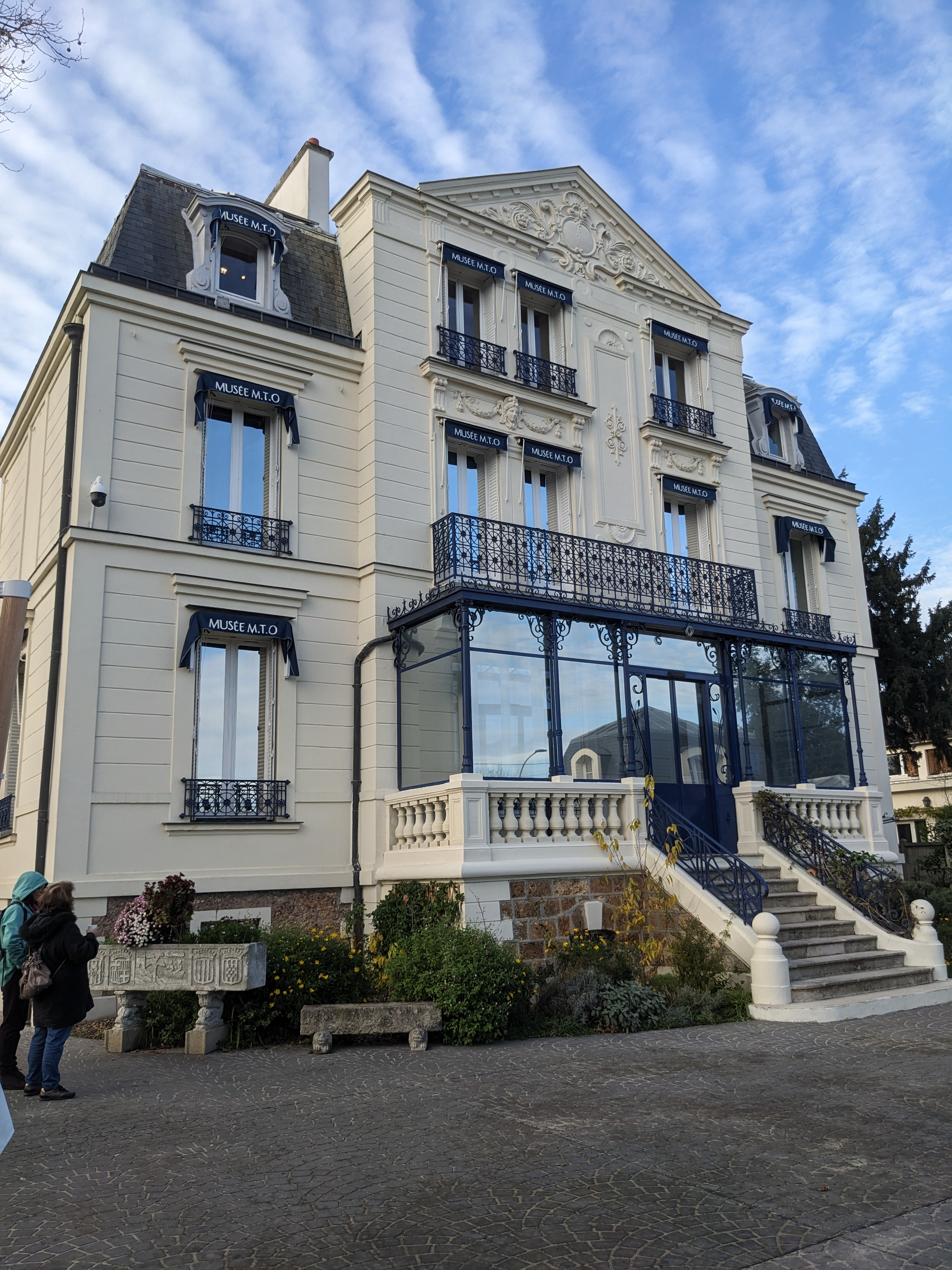
The Museum

The Museum is housed in a mansion dating back to the Second French Empire, situated on the banks of the Seine, near the Île des Impressionnistes and the Maison Fournaise. The building has been restored, with a newly added entrance pavilion to house the reception facilities. Following the renovation, the Museum received dual LEED Silver certification: one for the main building and garden and another for the reception pavilion. The museum's architecture integrates the historic 19th-century mansion with modern museum facilities, including state-of-the-art display cases and lighting systems that highlight the objects. Visitors experience a planned journey through the space, beginning with the mihrab on the first floor and progressing through gallery spaces that showcase the material culture and spiritual principles of Sufism.

== Permanent collection ==
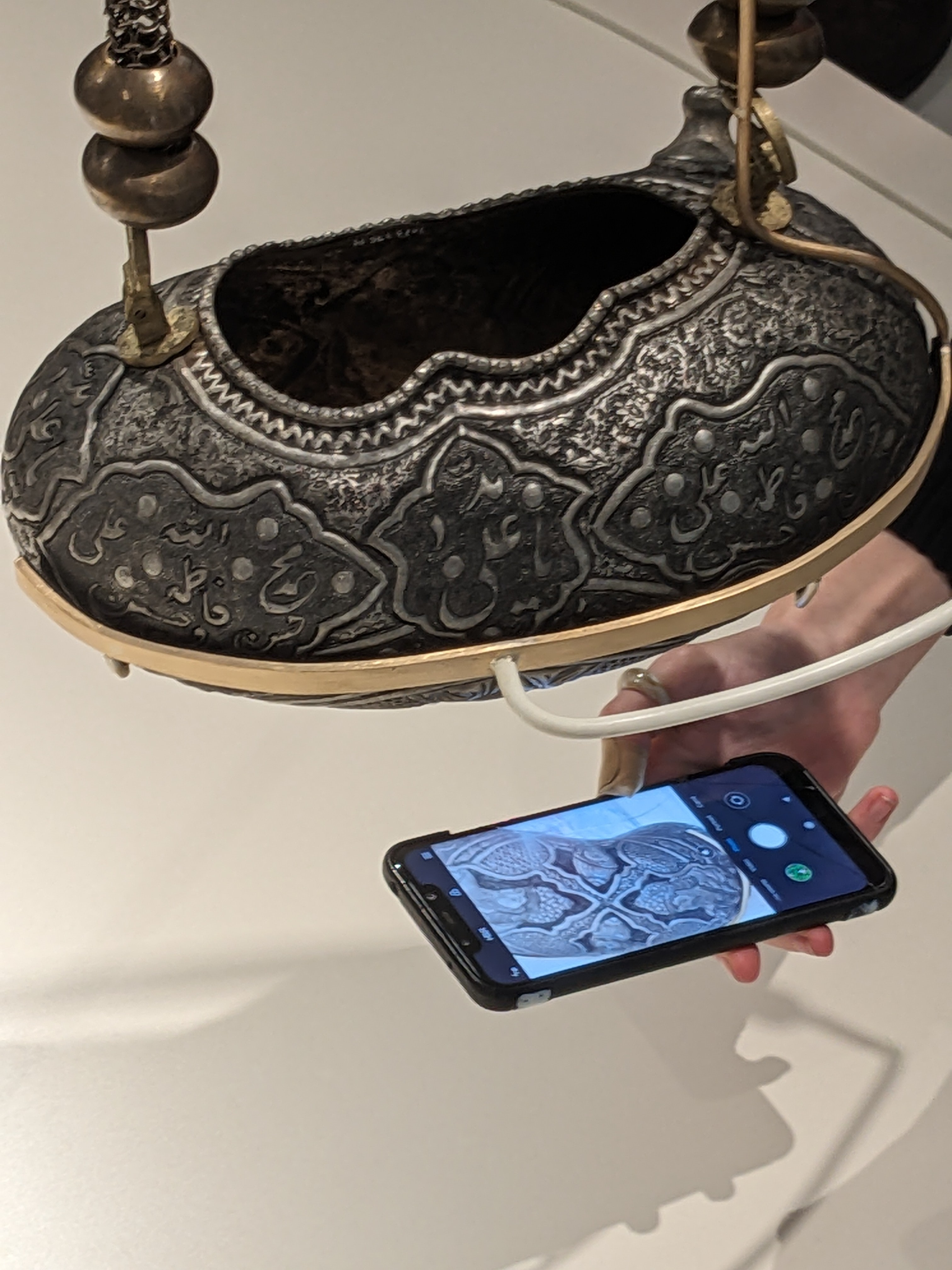
Kashkul

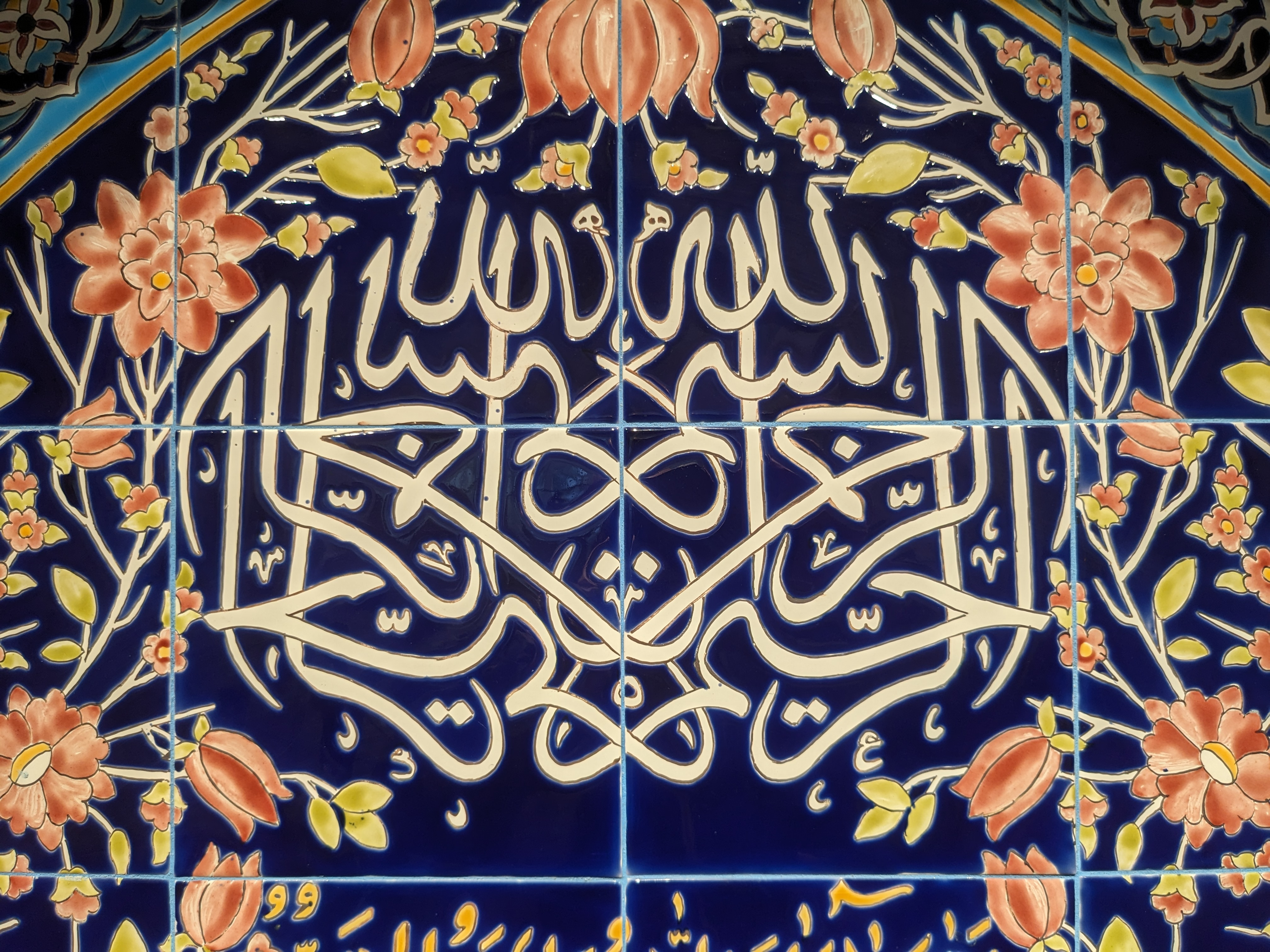
Calligraphy

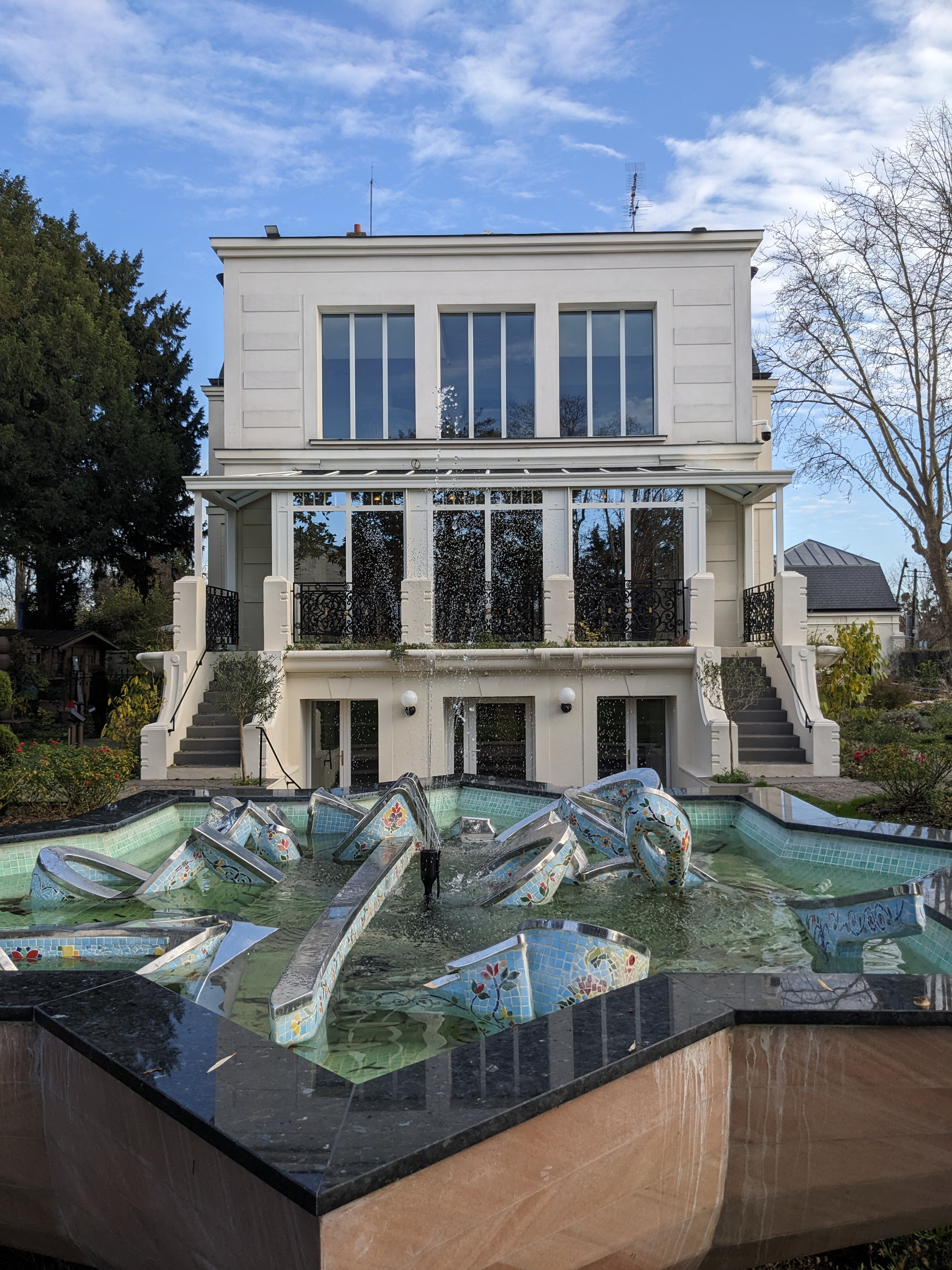
Garden facade and fountain

The museum's permanent collection encompasses approximately 300 objects and artworks related to Sufi history and culture, including music and calligraphy. This collection was carefully assembled over decades, and many of the artifacts have been preserved by the MTO Shahmaghsoudi School since the early 20th century.

These are displayed across three floors, covering roughly 600 square meters. While Sufism's roots trace back to Prophet Muhammad's time, most of the exhibited objects date from the 19th and 20th centuries, and several date back to the Achaemenid Empire. The items range from rare manuscripts and calligraphic works to intricately designed ceremonial objects such as Sufi kashkul, tabarzins, silsila, khirqa, sculptures, carpets, mihrabs and canes. Kashkuls are objects representative of Sufi culture: "Formerly used as bags, they have become ornamental objects."

A notable feature is a hologram of Hazrat Shah Maghsoud Sadegh Angha, an Iranian Sufi master, poet, and scholar who died in 1980. The hologram shows him in his library discussing Sufism, combining historic elements like his recorded voice with modern creative elements. Hazrat Shah Maghsoud first conceived the idea of the museum in the 1970s. Beyond its permanent collection, the museum serves as a cultural center with a research library that will be available for research and contemplation from 2025.

The garden's design draws inspiration from Persian and French traditions, featuring a central fountain shaped like an eight-pointed star. Though recently planted, it gradually develops into a "maze of roses."

== Temporary exhibitions ==
The Museum seeks to facilitate dialogue between Sufi principles and contemporary culture and art. As founding board member and President Claire Sahar Bay explains, "We didn't want to build a museum about the history of Sufism, on the social aspects; we wanted to explore, in-depth, the art and culture. The approach that we were envisioning was a dialogue with other disciplines, more specifically contemporary art," The Museum plans to host two temporary exhibitions annually, accompanied by conferences and workshops, and offers access to a research library by appointment. The museum's curatorial approach balances historical artefacts with contemporary art installations, exemplified by works like Bianca Bondi's mixed-media pieces and Monir Shahroudy Farmanfarmaian's mirror mosaics, creating a dialogue between traditional Sufi spirituality and modern artistic expression.

The inaugural temporary exhibition, "An Inner Sky", featured seven international artists from the late 20th and early 21st centuries: Moroccan Younes Rahmoun, Thai artist Pinaree Sanpitak, French-American Seffa Klein (Yves Klein's granddaughter), Zimbabwean Troy Makaza, Franco-Beninese Chloe Quenum, South African Bianca Bondi, and Iranian Monir Shahroudy Farmanfarmaian. The exhibition's title draws from Henry Corbin's work to evoke "the inner journey of the Sufi". This inaugural exhibition ended on 6 April 2025.
