= Canton of Chatou =

Coordinates: 48.89°N 2.16°E

- Canton
- Interactive map of Canton of Chatou
- Country: France
- Region: Île-de-France
- Department: Yvelines
- No. of communes: {{{nbcomm}}}
- Established: 28 January 1964
- Population (2023): 79,480
- INSEE code: 78 03

The canton of Chatou is an administrative division of the Yvelines department, northern France. Its borders were modified at the French canton reorganisation which came into effect in March 2015. Its seat is in Chatou.

It consists of the following communes:

1. Chatou
2. Croissy-sur-Seine
3. Marly-le-Roi
4. Le Port-Marly
5. Le Vésinet
