= Annie Swan Coburn =

American art collector

Annie Coburn
- Coburn in her hotel suite, c. 1925
- Born: Annie Swan; 1856; Fremont, Illinois, United States
- Died: May 31, 1932 (aged 75–76); Chicago, Illinois, United States
- Resting place: Graceland Cemetery, Illinois, United States
- Known for: Art collector
- Spouse: Lewis Larned Coburn (m. 1880; died 1910)

Annie Swan Coburn (1856 – 31 May 1932) was an American art collector and patron. She collected American art and French Impressionist paintings. Upon her death she left artworks to the Art Institute of Chicago, the Fogg Museum at Harvard University, and Smith College. The Art Institute received more than one hundred works of art.

== Life ==
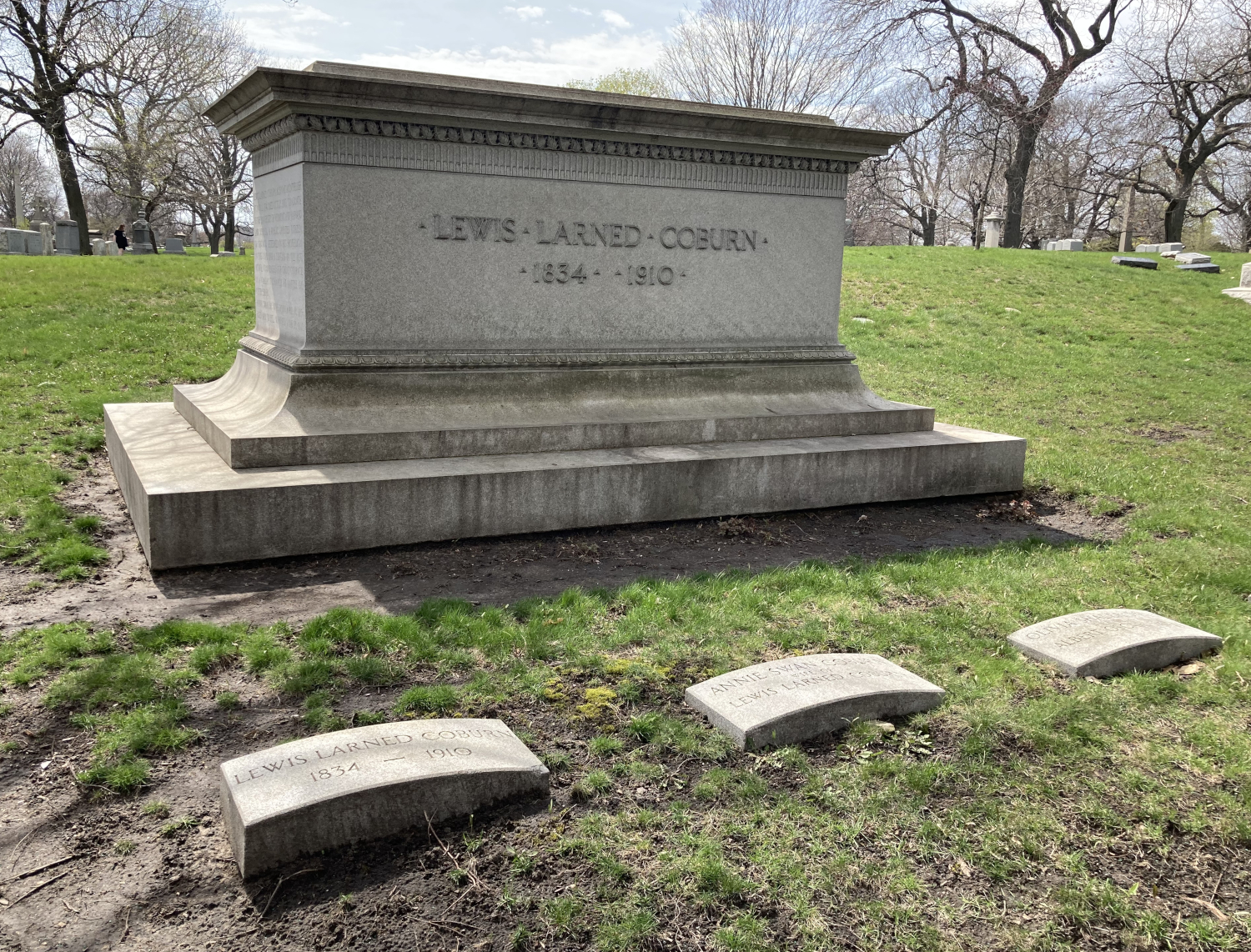
Coburn's grave at Graceland Cemetery

Swan was born in Fremont, Illinois in 1856. In 1880 she married Lewis Larned Coburn.

Lewis Larned Coburn died in 1910 and at that time Annie Swan Coburn began collecting art. She exhibited her collection in her apartment in the Blackstone Hotel, filling up much of the available space, including storing Vincent van Gogh's Sunny Midi, Arles under her bed. She died at her home at the Blackstone on May 31, 1932, and was buried at Graceland Cemetery.

== Legacy ==
Upon her death she left artworks to the Art Institute of Chicago, the Fogg Museum at Harvard University, and Smith College. The "Coburn Renoirs" became the core of the Art Institute's Impressionist painting collection.

== Selections of paintings donated to the Art Institute of Chicago ==
Paintings donated by Mrs. Lewis Larned (Annie Swan) Coburn in the public domain and for which pictures are available.

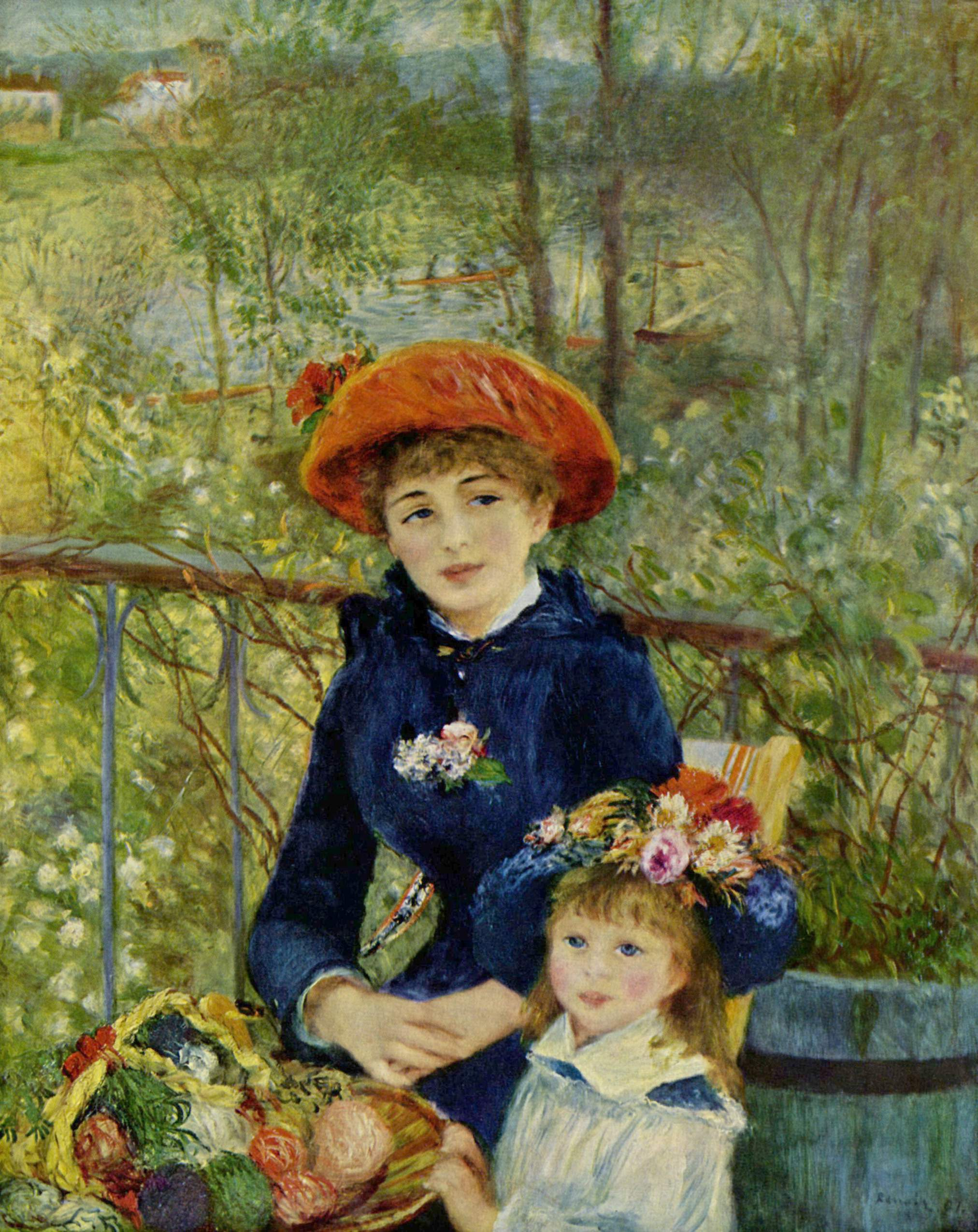
Pierre-Auguste Renoir, Two Sisters (On the Terrace), 1881

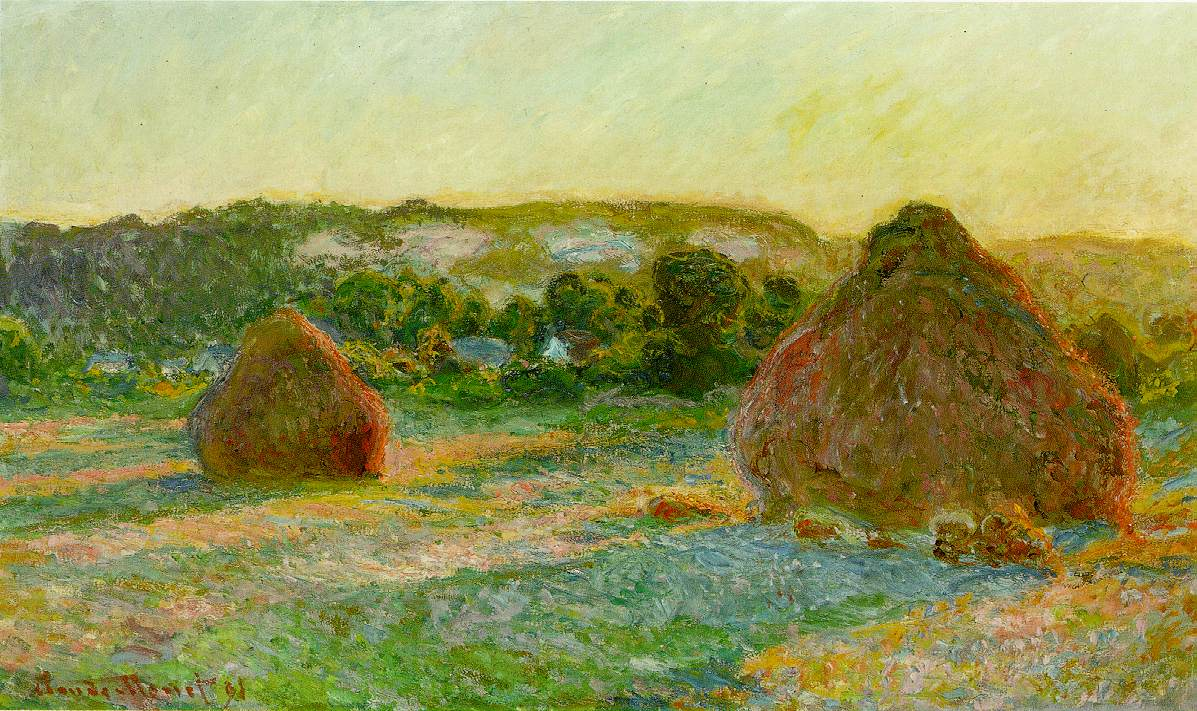
Claude Monet, Wheatstacks (End of Summer), 1897
