= Hôtel de Ville, Chatou =

Town hall in Chatou, France

Hôtel de Ville
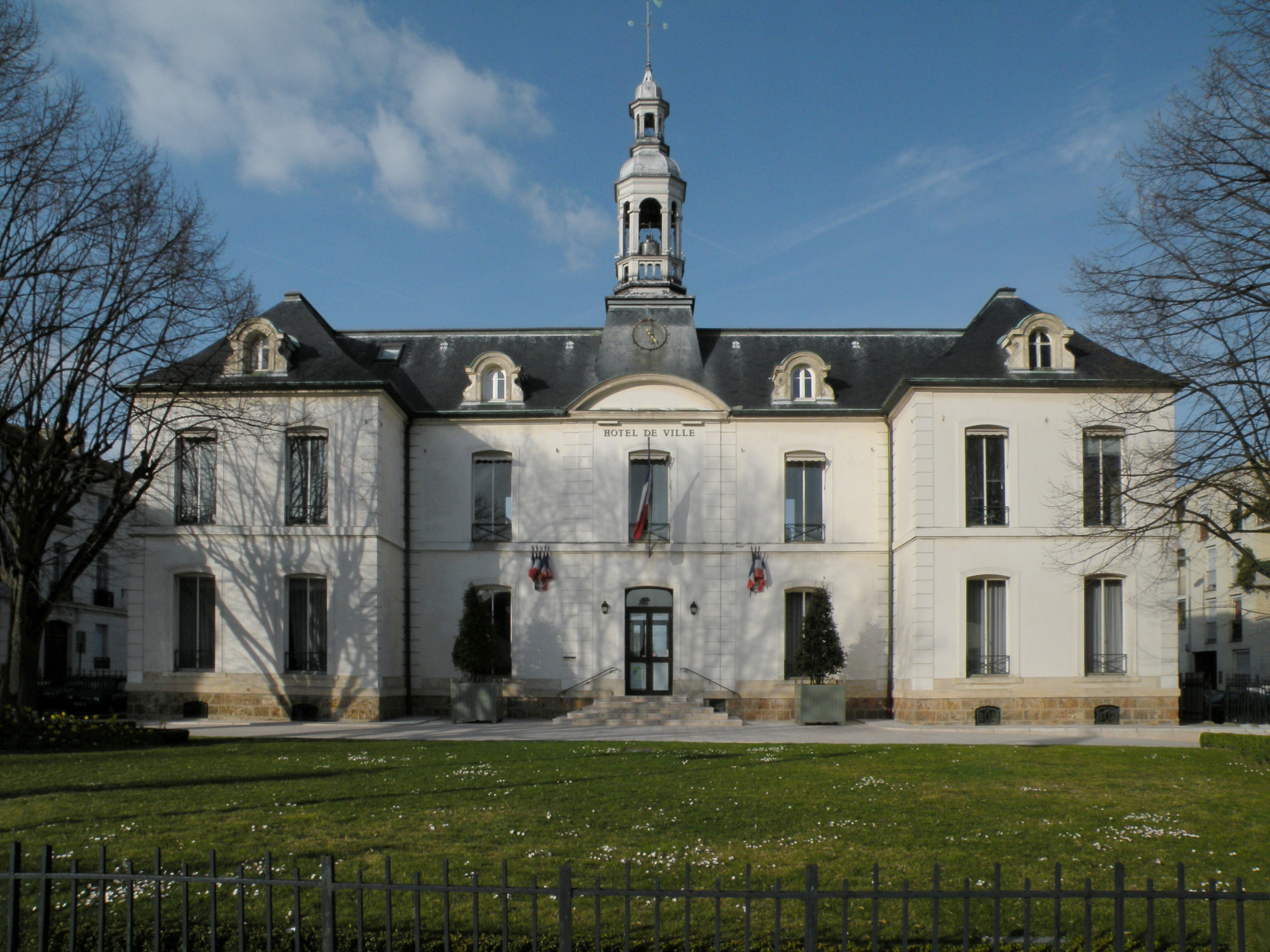
- The main frontage of the Hôtel de Ville in March 2009
- Interactive map of the Hôtel de Ville area

General information
- Type: City hall
- Architectural style: Louis XIII style
- Location: Chatou, France
- Coordinates: 48.8899°N 2.1575°E
- Completed: 1730

The Hôtel de Ville (French pronunciation: [otɛl də vil], City Hall) is a municipal building in Chatou, Yvelines in the northwestern suburbs of Paris, standing on Place du Général de Gaulle. It has been included on the Inventaire général des monuments by the French Ministry of Culture since 1986.

== History ==
Following the French Revolution, the town council initially met in the house of the mayor at the time. This changed in 1839, when they established a combined town hall and school in a building on Place de l'Église. After the opening of the Paris–Saint-Germain-en-Laye railway in 1837, and subsequent population growth, the council led by the mayor, Ernest Bousson, decided to establish a more substantial town hall. The property they selected was the Maison Fauchat. In the mid-1870s, the council formed a development company with 17 investors to finance and complete the purchase of the house and the substantial piece of land that came with it.

The house had been commissioned by Louis Jacques de Vitry, Sieur de Malassise. It was designed in the Louis XIII style, built in ashlar stone and was completed in 1730. The design involved a symmetrical main frontage of seven bays facing onto what is now Avenue du Maréchal Foch with the last two bays at each end projected forward. It featured a segmental headed doorway in the central bay and was fenestated by segmental headed casement windows. It was acquired by the ballet dancer, Gaétan Vestris, and his sister, Thérèse Vestris, in 1761, and was bought by the politician and member of the Chamber of Peers, Camille Périer, in 1829. The main reception room was finely decorated to a design by Jean Bérot in 1830.

The house was acquired by the Fauchat family before being bought on behalf of the council in January 1878. A major programme of works involving the installation of a clock, which was flanked by pilasters supporting a segmental pediment, and the introduction of an octagonal bell tower behind it, was undertaken to a design by François-Eugène Bardon, before the building re-opened in June 1880. The façade was enhanced by the addition of red brickwork decorated with stucco panels around the same time. Internally, the principal rooms created were the Salle du Conseil (council chamber) and the Salle des Mariages (wedding room).

During the Second World War, after the Chatou massacre in which 27 Frenchmen were executed in August 1944 as a reprisal for a French Resistance attack, a copy of a poster showing the faces of the victims was installed in the town hall to commemorate the event.

In 1964, the building was refurbished and given a cement render finish with a coating of white paint. However, in August 2019, the council decided to remove the cement render and restore the façade to the style of the late 19th century. The council's administrative services were relocated to a modern building on east side of Rue des BeaunesI in November 2019, and the restoration of the facade of the town hall was completed in September 2025.
