= Lunch at the Restaurant Fournaise =

1875 painting by Pierre-Auguste Renoir

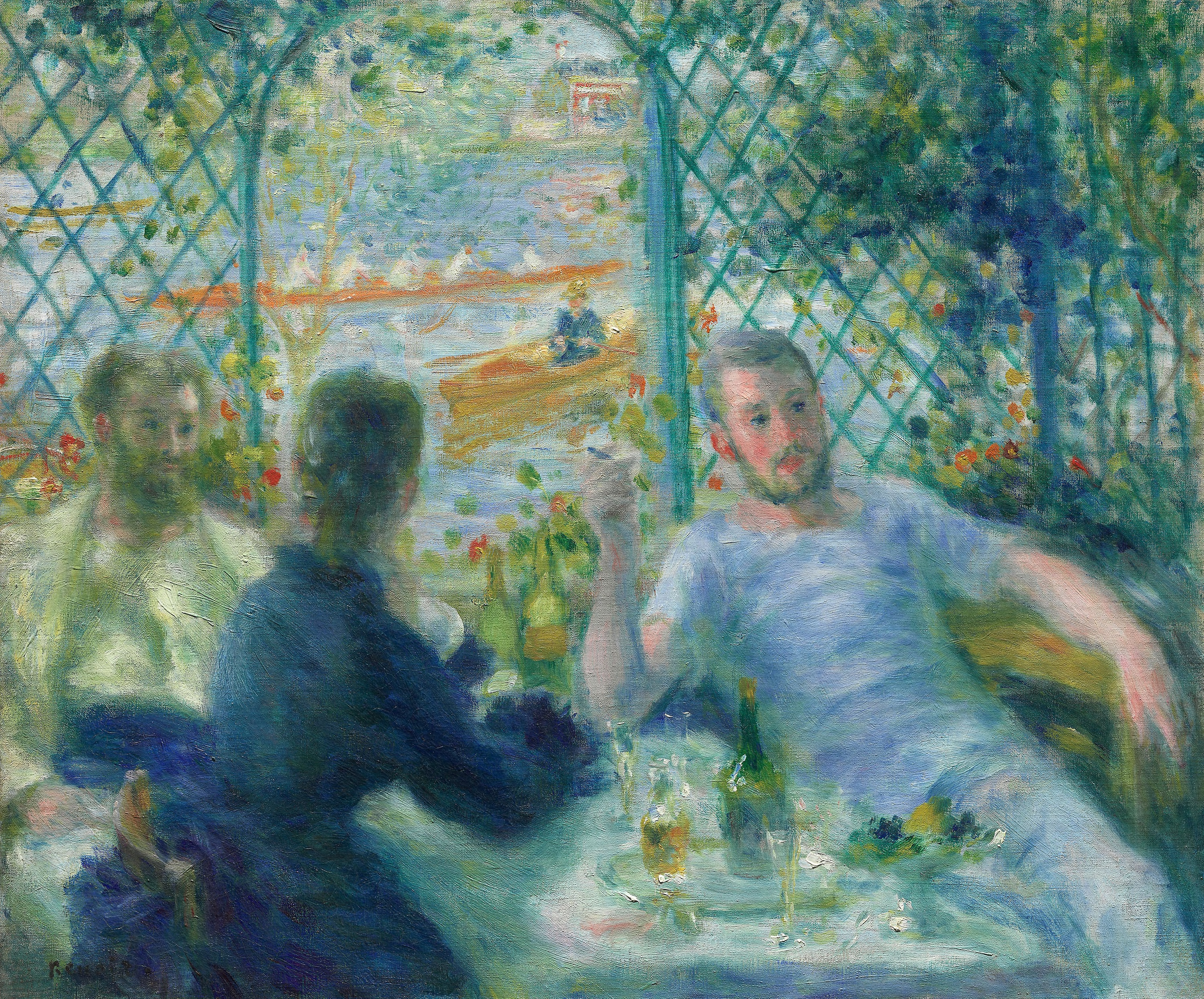
- Artist: Pierre-Auguste Renoir
- Year: 1875
- Medium: oil on canvas
- Dimensions: 55 cm × 65.9 cm (22 in × 25.9 in)
- Location: Art Institute of Chicago, Chicago

Lunch at the Restaurant Fournaise, also known as The Rowers' Lunch, Déjeuner chez Fournaise, or Déjeuner au Restaurant Fournaise, is an 1875–1879 painting by Pierre-Auguste Renoir. It portrays three people having lunch at the Maison Fournaise located on the Île des Impressionnistes in the River Seine at Chatou, west of Paris. A rower and a coxed four are portrayed outside the restaurant, boating on the river.

The painting is exhibited at the Art Institute of Chicago.

Renoir also painted the Maison Fournaise in his 1881 Luncheon of the Boating Party.

== See also ==
- List of paintings by Pierre-Auguste Renoir
