= Luncheon of the Boating Party =

Painting by Pierre-Auguste Renoir

- Le Déjeuner des canotiers (French)
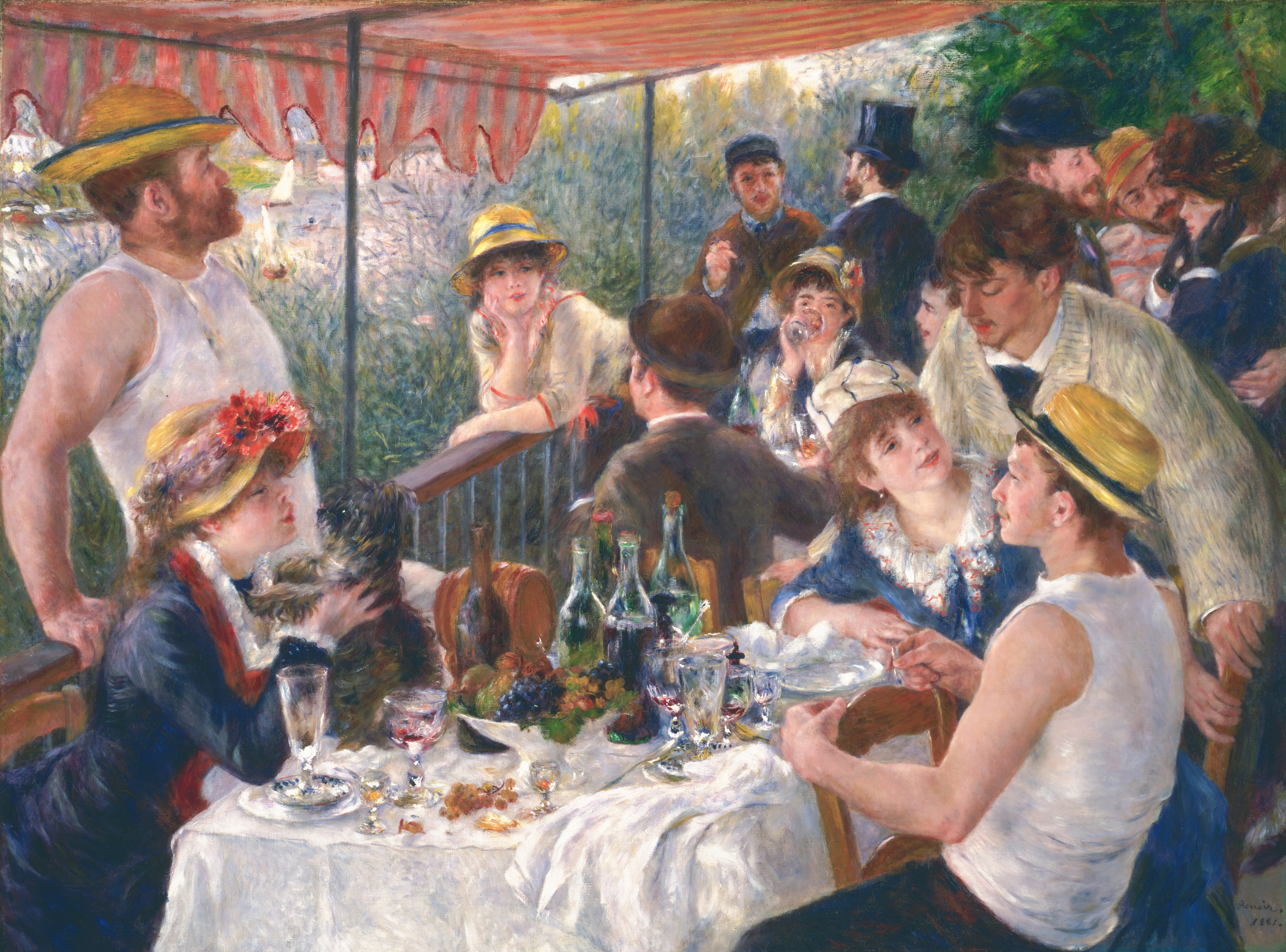
- Artist: Pierre-Auguste Renoir
- Year: 1880–1881
- Medium: Oil on canvas
- Dimensions: 130.2 cm × 175.6 cm (51.3 in × 69.1 in)
- Location: The Phillips Collection, Washington, D.C.

Luncheon of the Boating Party (French: Le Déjeuner des canotiers) is an 1880–1881 painting by French impressionist Pierre-Auguste Renoir. Exhibited at the Seventh Impressionist Exhibition in 1882, it was identified as the best painting in the show by three critics. It was purchased from the artist by the dealer-patron Paul Durand-Ruel and bought in 1923 (for $125,000) from his son by industrialist Duncan Phillips, who spent a decade in pursuit of the work. It is now in The Phillips Collection in Washington, D.C. It shows a richness of form, a fluidity of brush stroke, and a flickering light.

== Description ==
The painting, combining figures, still-life, and landscape in one work, depicts a group of Renoir's friends relaxing on a balcony at the Maison Fournaise restaurant along the Seine river in Chatou, France. The painter and art patron, Gustave Caillebotte, is seated in the lower right. Renoir's future wife, Aline Charigot, is in the foreground playing with a small dog, an affenpinscher; she replaced an earlier woman who sat for the painting but with whom Renoir became annoyed. On the table are fruit and wine.

The diagonal of the railing serves to demarcate the two halves of the composition, one densely packed with figures, the other all but empty, save for the two figures of the proprietor's daughter Louise-Alphonsine Fournaise and her brother, Alphonse Fournaise, Jr, who are made prominent by this contrast. In this painting Renoir has captured a great deal of light. The main focus of light is coming from the large opening in the balcony, next to the large man with hat and singlet. The singlets of both men in the foreground and the table-cloth all work together to reflect this light and send it through the whole composition.

The painting is thought to show the influence of Italian Renaissance painter Paolo Veronese on Renoir's style, in particular, The Wedding Feast at Cana (1563), one of Renoir's favorite Veronese paintings at the Louvre, which depicts a banquet theme similar to the Luncheon.

== Interactive image ==
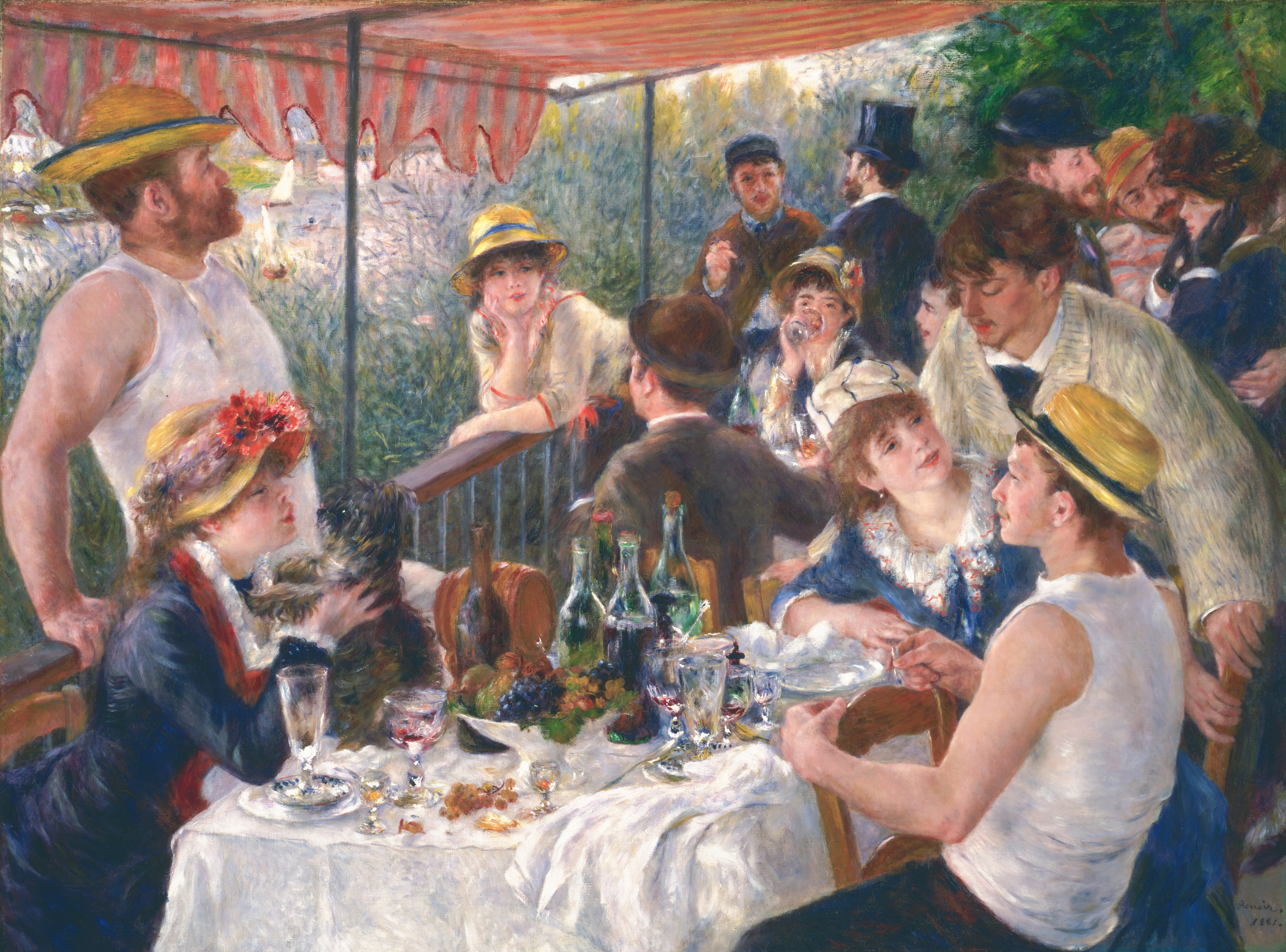
Clickable image of the Luncheon of the Boating Party (1881) by Pierre-Auguste Renoir (The Phillips Collection, Washington, D.C.). Place your mouse cursor over a person in the painting to see their name; click to link to an article about them. (view • discuss)

=== Subjects depicted ===
As he often did in his paintings, Renoir included several of his friends in Luncheon of the Boating Party. Identification of the sitters was made in 1912 by Julius Meier-Graefe. Among them are the following:

- The seamstress Aline Charigot, who is holding an affenpinscher dog, sits near the bottom left of the composition. Renoir married her in 1890, and they had three sons.
- Charles Ephrussi—wealthy amateur art historian, collector, and editor of the Gazette des Beaux-Arts—appears wearing a top hat in the background. The younger man to whom Ephrussi appears to be speaking, more casually attired in a brown coat and cap, may be Jules Laforgue, his personal secretary and also a poet and critic.
- Actress Ellen Andrée drinks from a glass in the center of the composition. Seated across from her is Baron Raoul Barbier, former mayor of colonial Saigon.
- Placed within but peripheral to the party are the proprietor's daughter Louise-Alphonsine Fournaise and her brother, Alphonse Fournaise, Jr., both sporting traditional straw boaters and appearing to the left side of the image. Alphonsine is the smiling woman leaning on the railing; Alphonse, who was responsible for the boat rental, is the leftmost figure.
- Also wearing boaters are figures appearing to be Renoir's close friends Eugène Pierre Lestringez, a bureaucrat, and Paul Lhote, himself an artist. Renoir depicts them flirting with the actress Jeanne Samary in the upper righthand corner of the painting.
- In the right foreground, Gustave Caillebotte wears a white boater's shirt and flat-topped straw boater's hat as he sits backwards in his chair next to actress Angèle Legault and journalist Adrien Maggiolo . An art patron, painter, and important figure in the impressionist circle, Caillebotte was also an avid boatman and drew on that subject for several works.

==== Close-ups ====
Luncheon of the Boating Party - Details of the Women

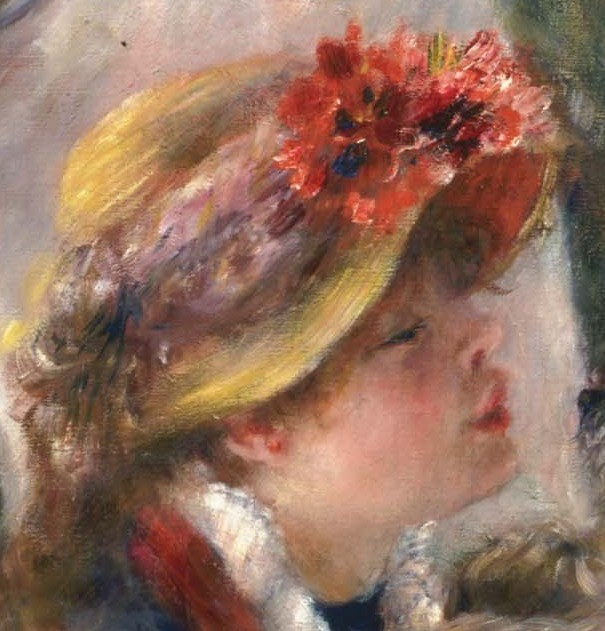
Aline Charigot

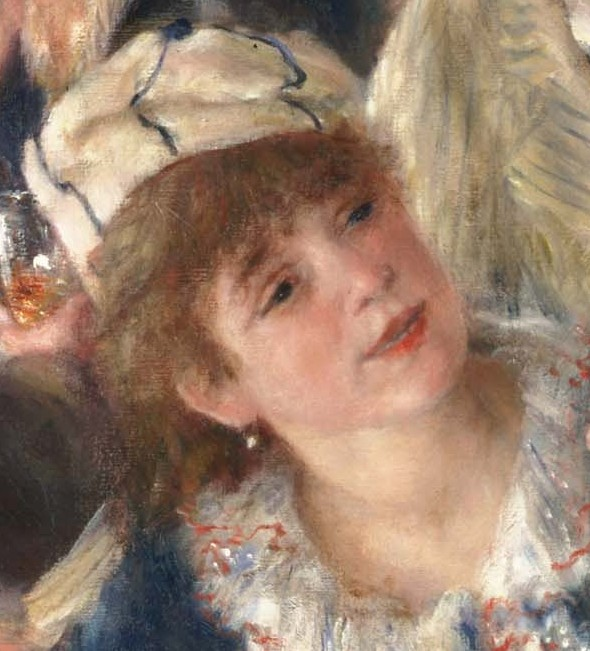
Angèle Legault

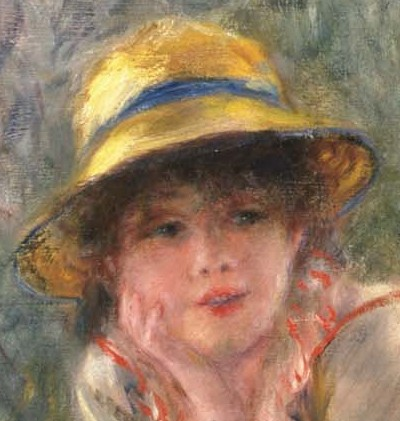
Louise-Alphonsine Fournaise

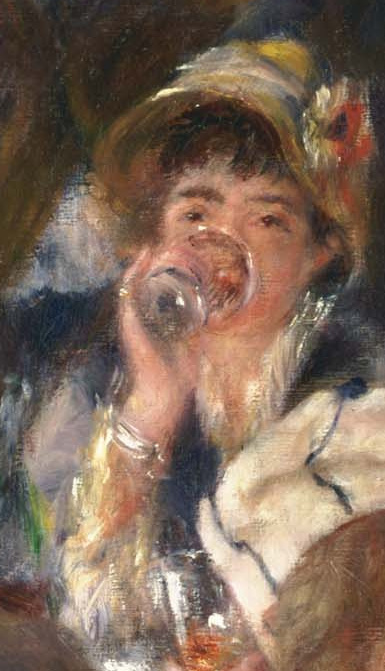
Ellen Andrée

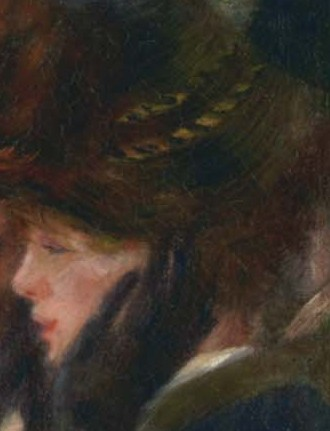
Jeanne Samary

Luncheon of the Boating Party - Details of the Men

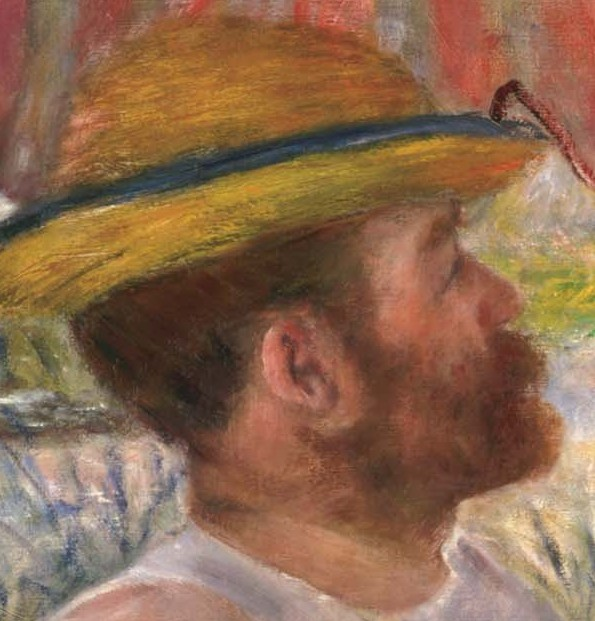
Alphonse Fournaise, Jr.

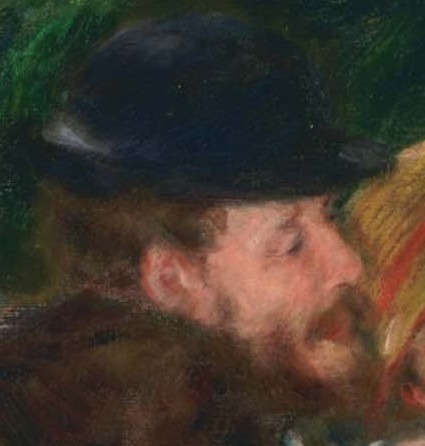
Pierre Lestringuèz

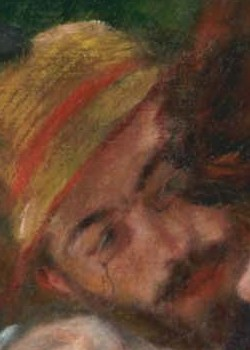
Paul Lhôte

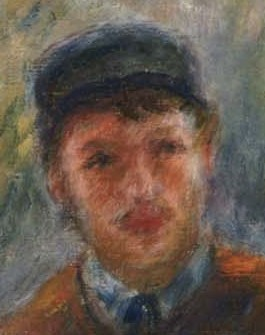
Jules Laforgue

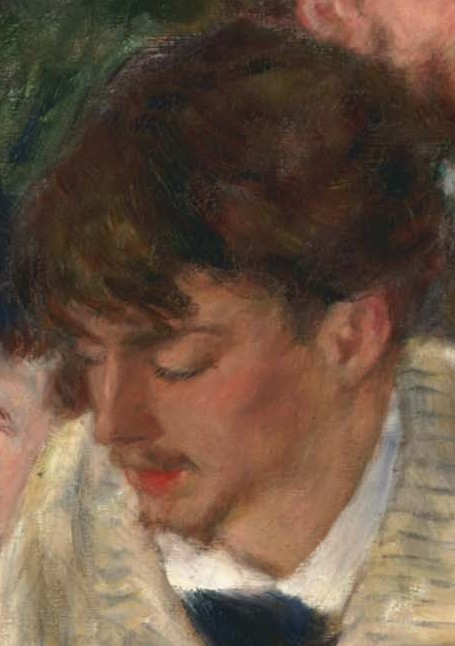
Adrien Maggiolo

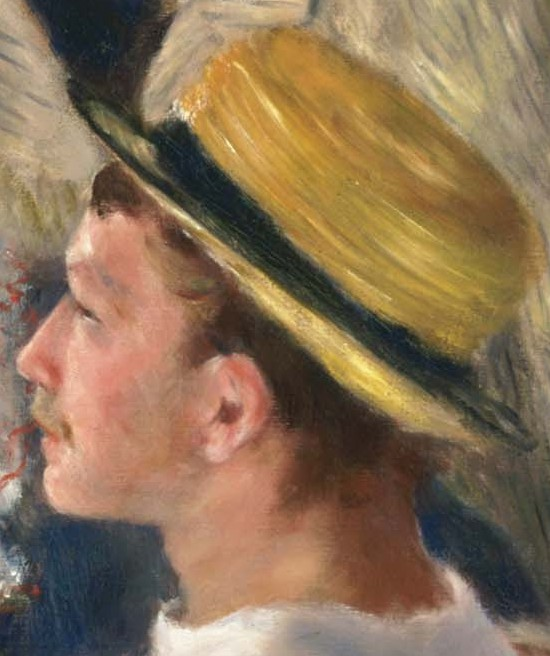
Gustave Caillebotte

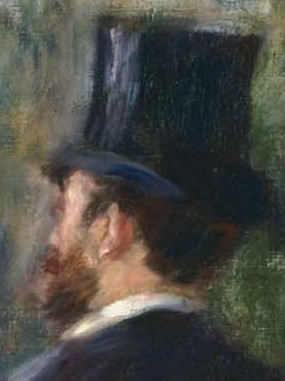
Charles Ephrussi

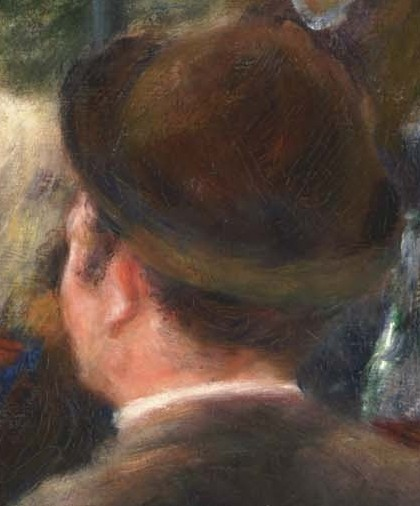
Raoul Barbier

=== Actual location ===
The actual location of the scene is Maison Fournaise in Chatou, France.

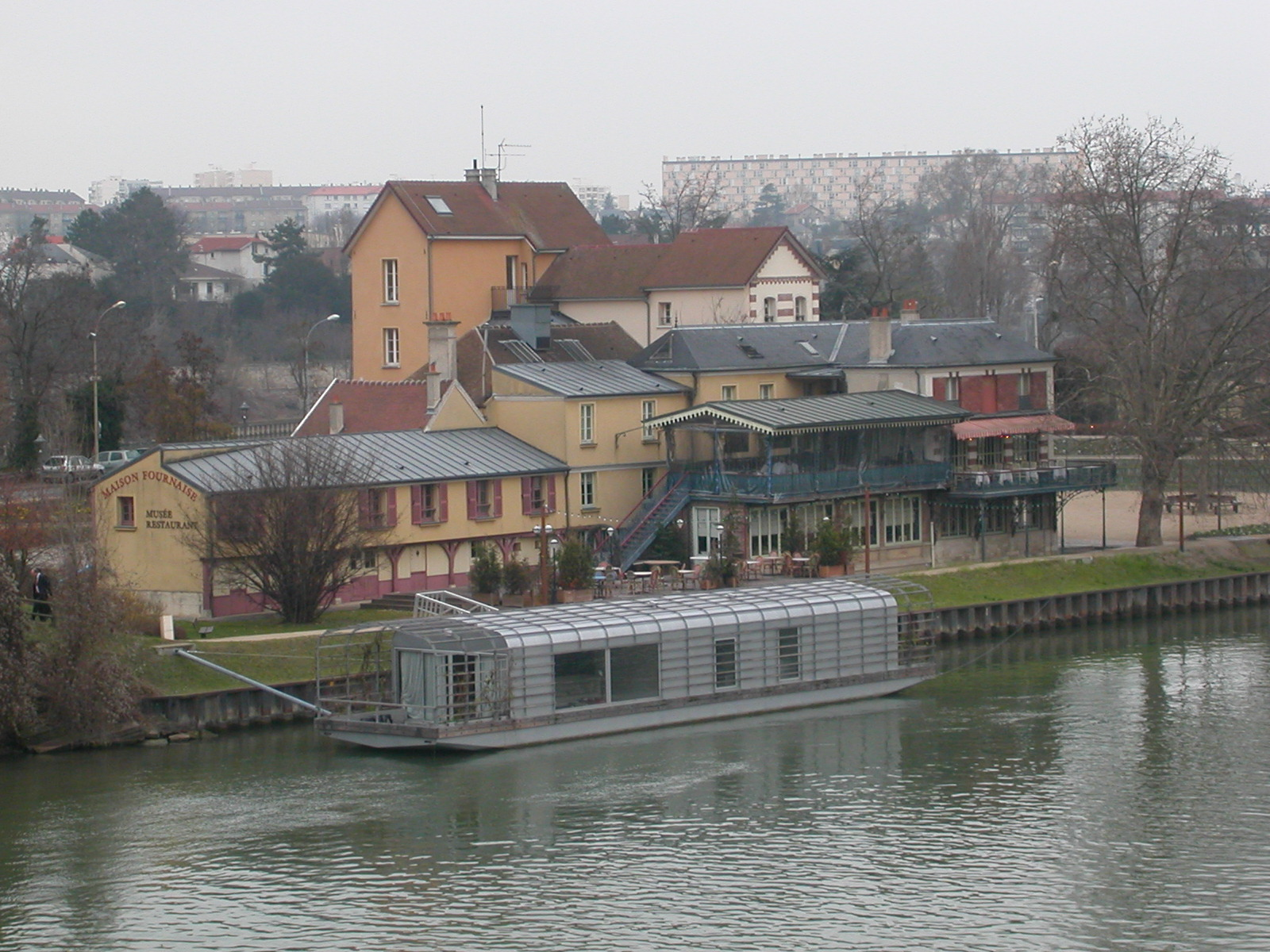
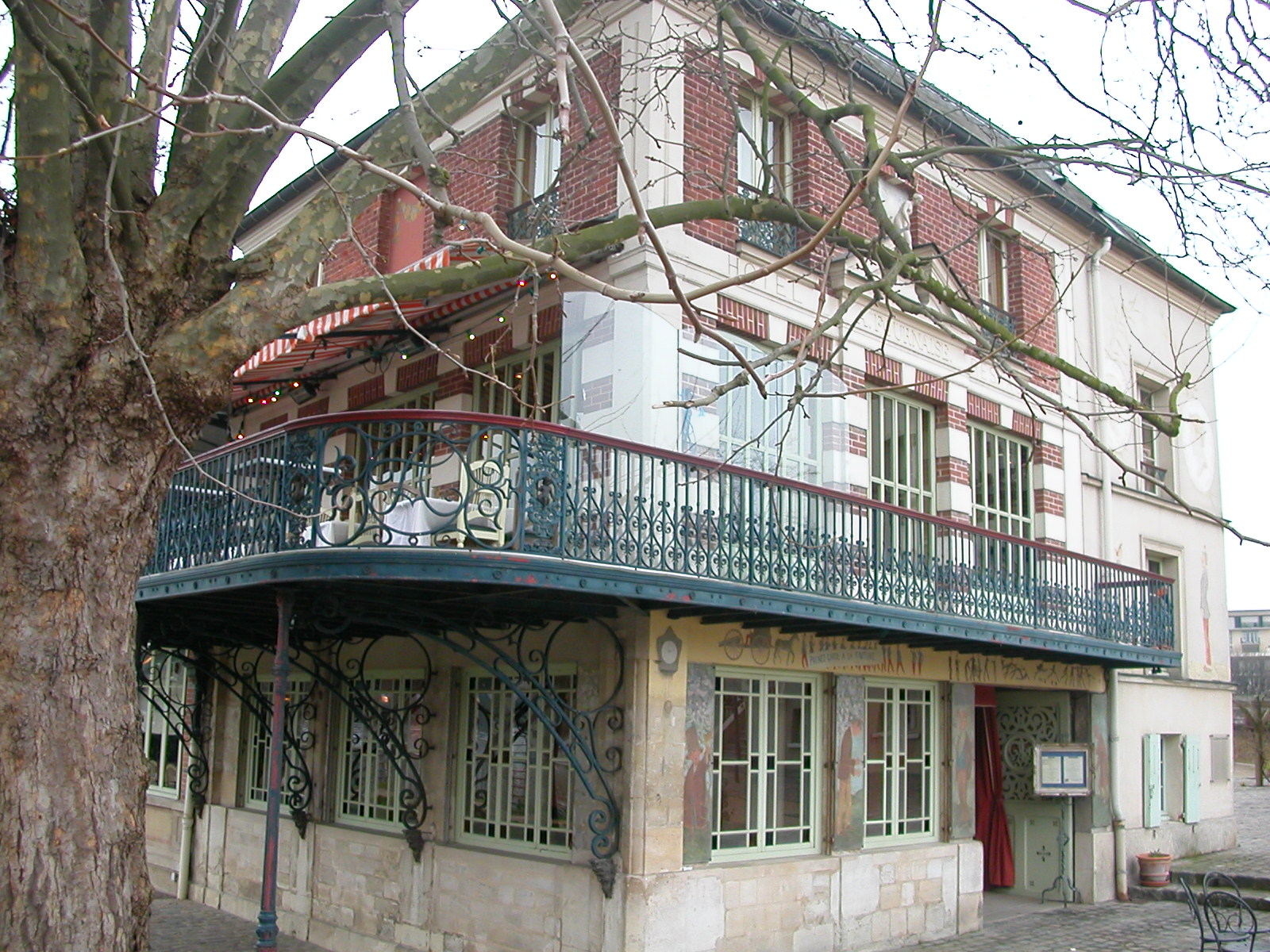
The modern-day Maison Fournaise restaurant along the River Seine in Chatou, France.

== Contemporary critical reception ==
At the Seventh Impressionist Exhibition in 1882, the painting generally received praise from critics. "It is fresh and free without being too bawdy," wrote Paul de Charry in Le Pays, March 10, 1882. In La Vie Moderne (March 11, 1882), Armand Silvestre wrote, "...one of the best things [Renoir] has painted...There are bits of drawing that are completely remarkable, drawing – true drawing – that is a result of the juxtaposition of hues and not of line. It is one of the most beautiful pieces that this insurrectionist art by Independent artists has produced." Alternatively, Le Figaro published Albert Wolff's comment on March 2, 1882: "If he had learned to draw, Renoir would have a very pretty picture..."

== In popular culture ==
- Actor Edward G. Robinson (1893-1973) is quoted as saying: “For over thirty years I made periodic visits to Renoir's Luncheon of the Boating Party in a Washington museum, and stood before that magnificent masterpiece hour after hour, day after day, plotting ways to steal it."
- A homage to this painting appears in the final panel of On the False Earths (1977), the seventh volume of Jean-Claude Mézières and Pierre Christin's long-running comic book series Valérian and Laureline.
- The painting was featured prominently in Jean-Pierre Jeunet's film Le Fabuleux Destin d'Amélie Poulain — released in English as Amélie (2001). The most prominent reference is a comparison between the film's protagonist, Amélie, and the woman in the centre sipping a glass (Ellen Andrée), seemingly gazing out of the canvas, uninterested, while everyone else is enjoying the day together. The painting and its relationship to Amélie is also featured in the 2015 musical version of the film in the song "The Girl with the Glass".
- Renoir's creation of the painting is dramatized in Susan Vreeland's 2007 novel Luncheon of the Boating Party.

== See also ==
- List of paintings by Pierre-Auguste Renoir
- Lunch at the Restaurant Fournaise, 1879 painting by Renoir
- Guinguette
- 100 Great Paintings, 1980 BBC series
