= Île des Impressionnistes =

Île des Impressionnistes Île de Chatou
- Island
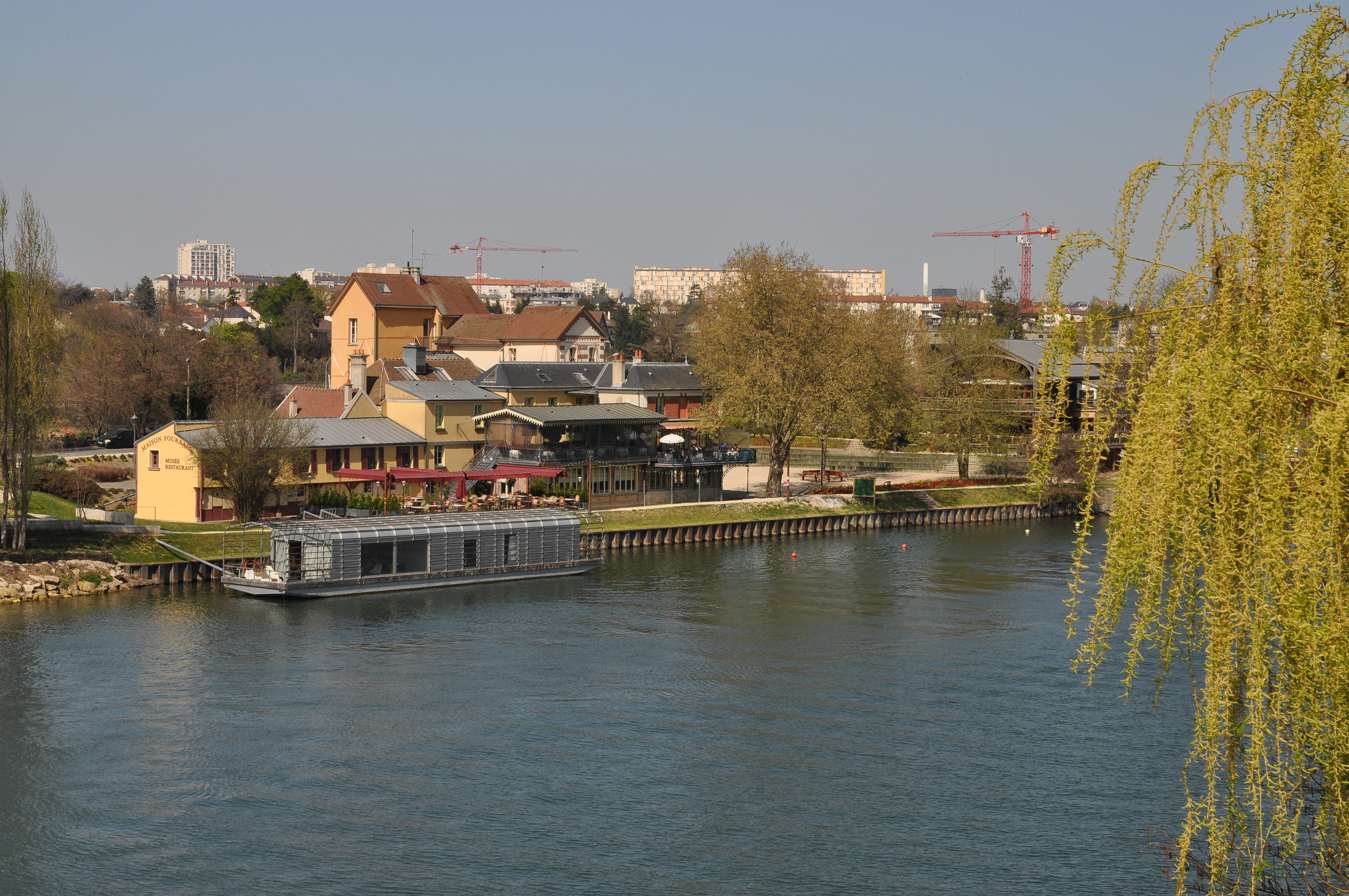
- The Maison Fournaise

- Location within Île-de-France (region) Location within France
- Coordinates: 48°53′27″N 2°9′49″E
- Country: France
- Region: Île-de-France
- Department: Yvelines
- Commune: Chatou
- Named for: Impressionists

The Île des Impressionnistes (transl. Island of Impressionists), or Île de Chatou, is an island in the Seine located to the west of Île-de-France, between the communes of Chatou in Yvelines, on the right bank (to which it is administratively attached), and Rueil-Malmaison in Hauts-de-Seine, on the left bank.

== Toponymy ==
The island got its name because it was popular with impressionist painters, including Claude Monet, in the second half of the 19th century.

== History ==
Towards the end of the 18th century, the great and the small island of Chatou were connected by a dike to reinforce the current and thus improve the efficiency of the Machine de Marly. The small island is also joined to the commune of Croissy-sur-Seine by a long dike. The left arm of the Seine is called Marly arm and right arm, widened and expanded in the 19th century, is called the Rivière Neuve Arm.

The late 19th and early 20th century was a unique period. In the 1860s, the Maison Fournaise prospered there. Artists like Claude Monet and Guy de Maupassant often described the pleasures of the boating and the Maison Fournaise in its short stories. Réalier-Dumas decorated the north facade of the House (his restored fresco is still visible today). Gustave Caillebotte who possessed several boats introduced his friends to the boats and to the sail.

A dam was built in 1933 (demolished in 2013) and a hydraulic test laboratory was established there. Located in the extension of the historic Parisian axis, the island served as an extension to the latter, unless, as shown in a study, its northern part remains for a long time only in a wasteland.

After the war, many installations were carried out by EDF on this site which became the Chatou Research and Test Center. The Parc des Impressionnistes was inaugurated in 1980. Between 1982 and 2003, the Maison Fournaise and the Maison Levanneur were restored and the Centre National de l'Estampe et de l'Art Imprimé (CNEAI) was opened.

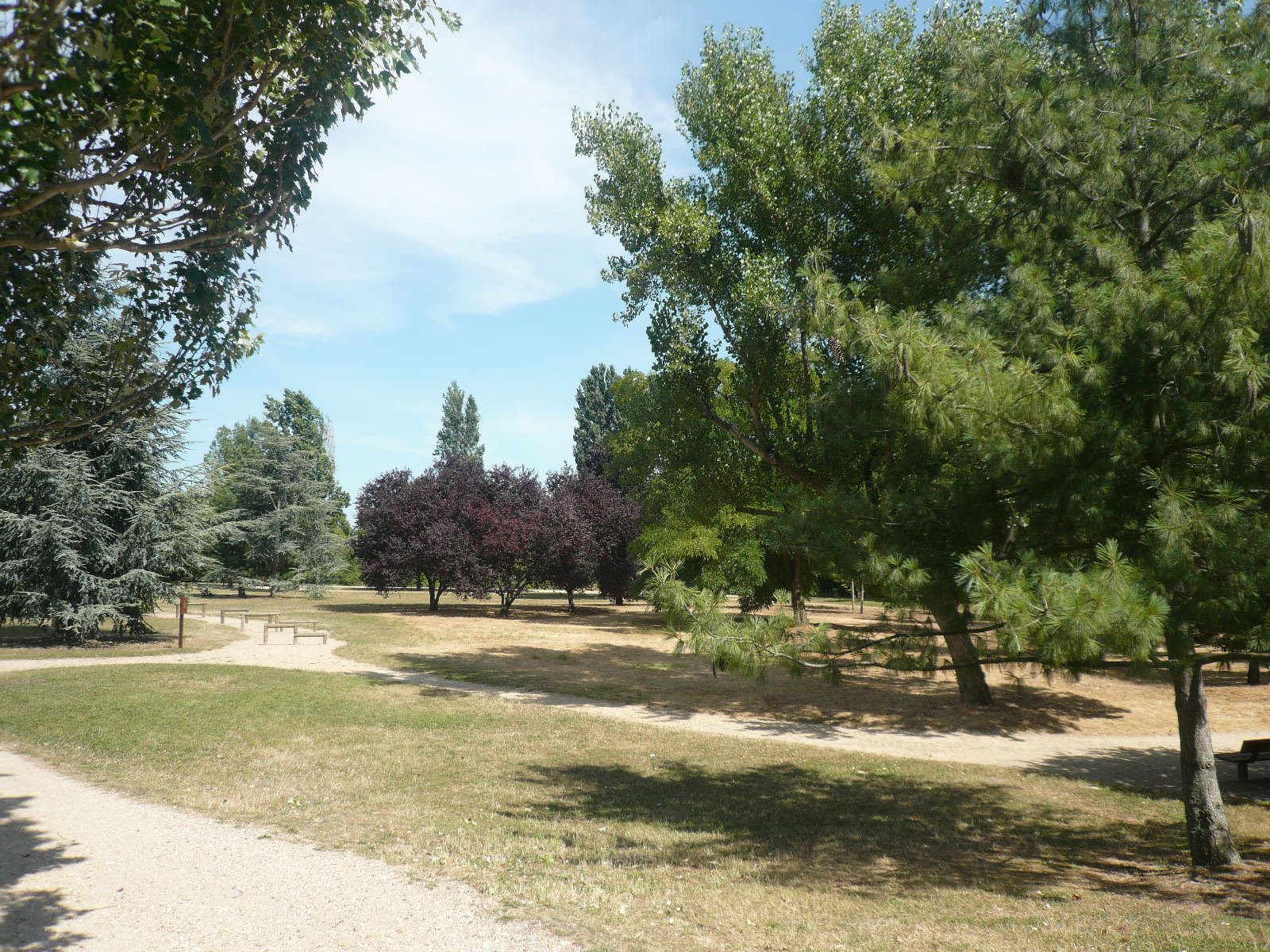
Parc des Impressionistes.

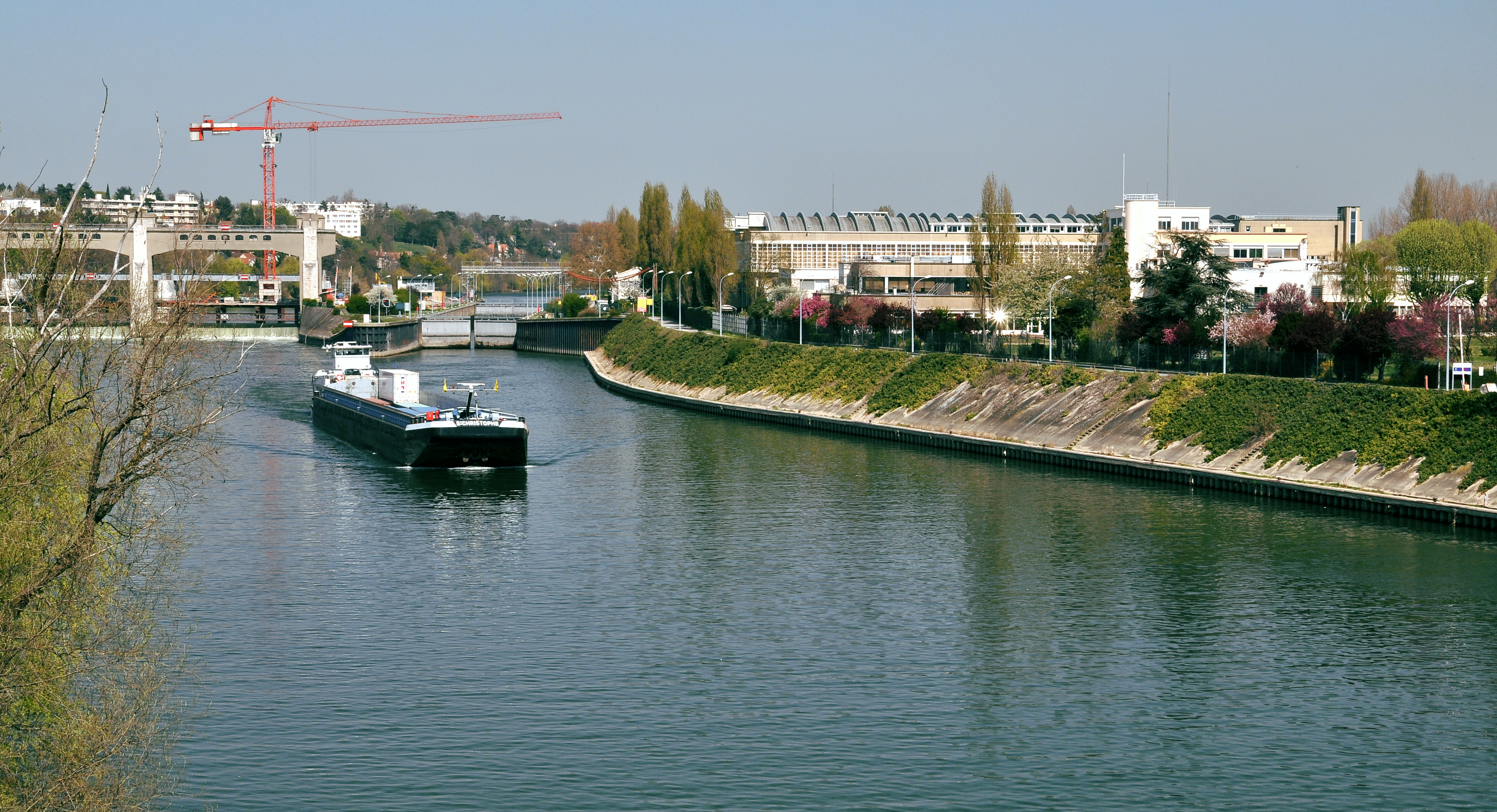
Barge next to Île de Chatou.

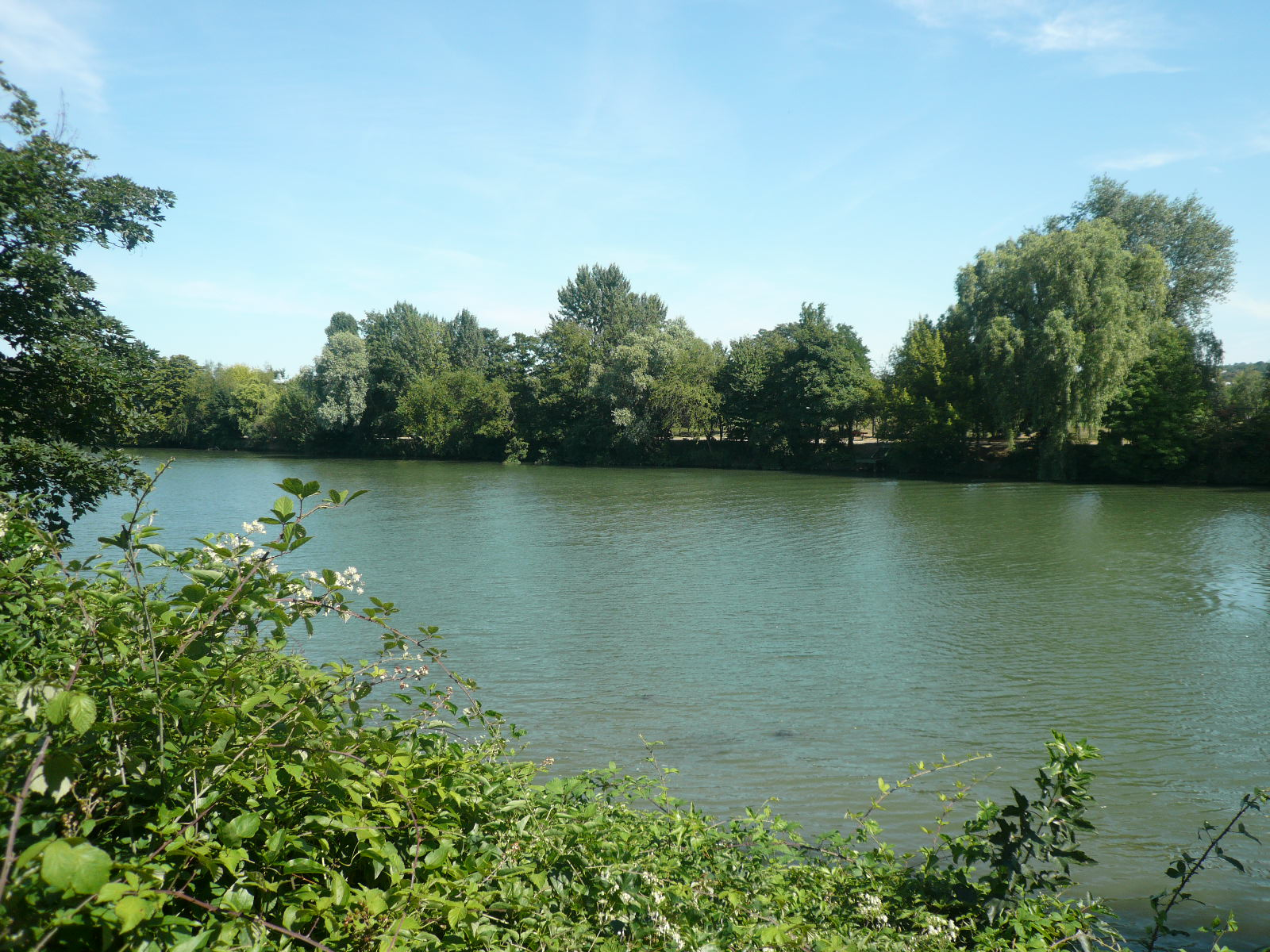
View of the Seine from the Parc des Impressionistes.

== Events ==
- The Elektric Park Festival since 2017.
- The Disko Park festival 2018 in Chatou.
- The Island Festival organized by the CNEAI.
