= Chatou =

- Commune
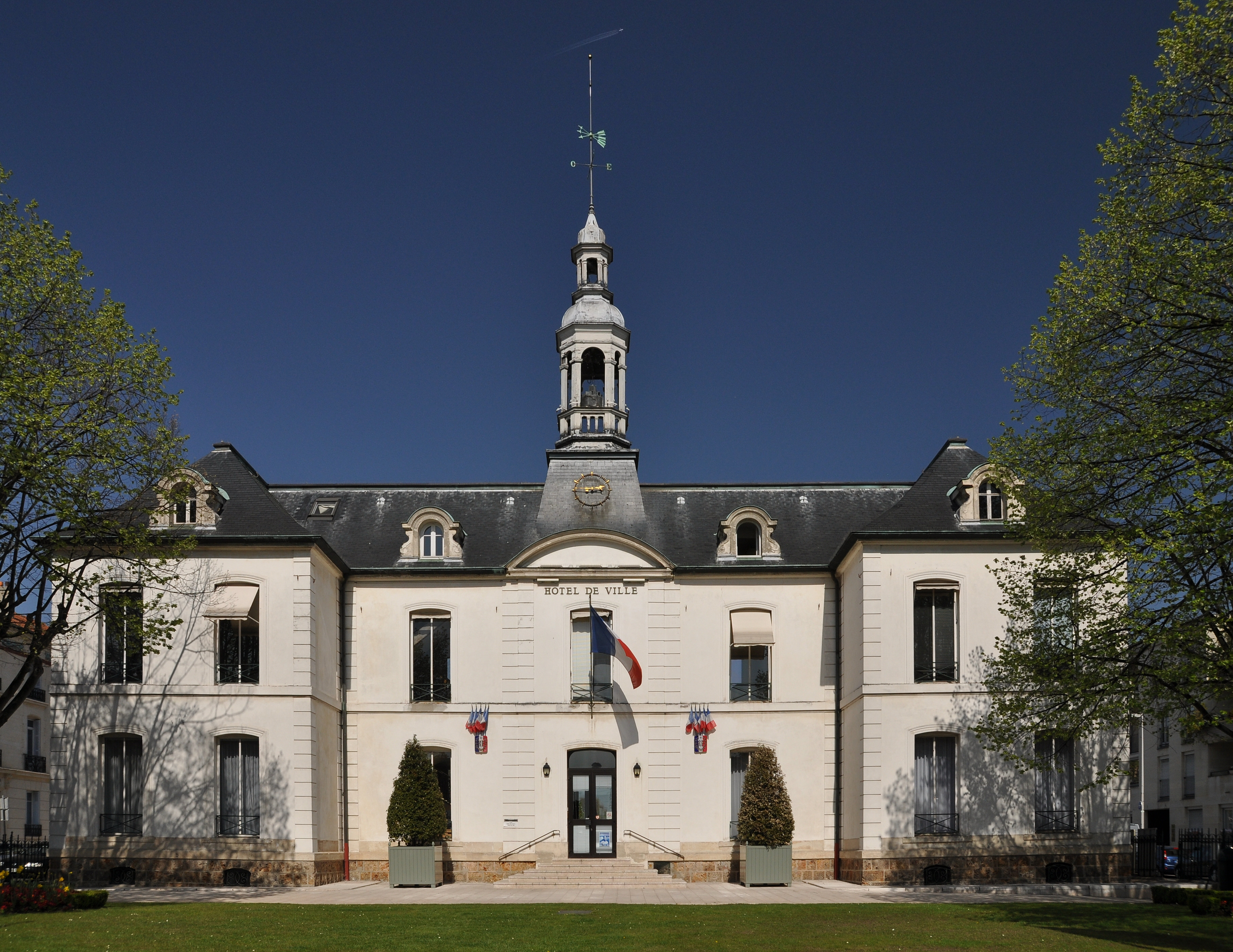
- Town hall

- Coat of arms

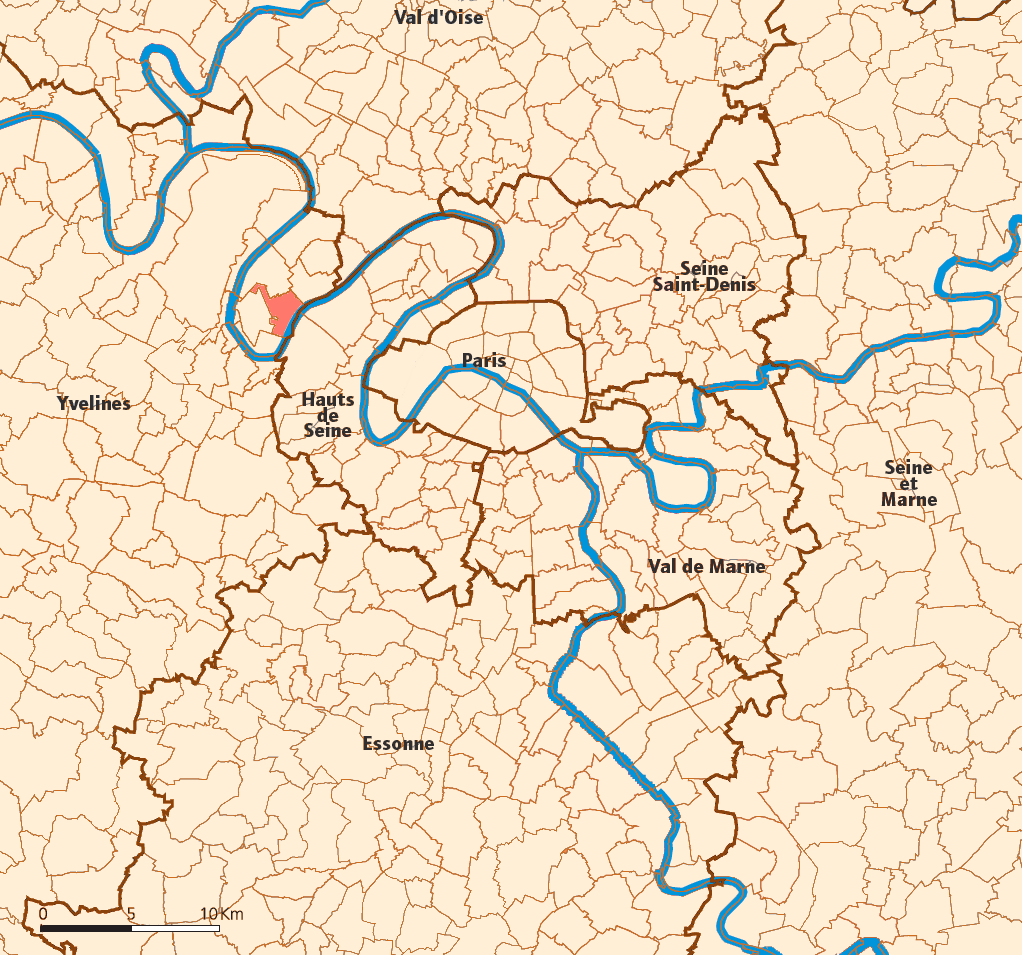
- Location (in red) within Paris inner and outer suburbs
- Location of Chatou
- Location within France Location within Île-de-France (region)
- Coordinates: 48°53′23″N 2°09′26″E
- Country: France
- Region: Île-de-France
- Department: Yvelines
- Arrondissement: Saint-Germain-en-Laye
- Canton: Chatou
- Intercommunality: CA Saint Germain Boucles Seine

Government
  - Mayor (2024–2026): Michèle Grellier
- Area^{1}: 5.08 km^{2} (1.96 sq mi)
- Highest elevation: 58 m (190 ft)
- Lowest elevation: 22 m (72 ft)
- Population (2023): 30,598
  - Density: 6,020/km^{2} (15,600/sq mi)
- Demonym: Catoviens
- Time zone: UTC+01:00 (CET)
  - Summer (DST): UTC+02:00 (CEST)
- INSEE/Postal code: 78146 /78400
- Website: www.chatou.fr
- ^{1} French Land Register data, which excludes lakes, ponds, glaciers > 1 km^{2} (0.386 sq mi or 247 acres) and river estuaries.

Chatou (French pronunciation: [ʃatu]) is a commune in the Yvelines department in the Île-de-France region in northern France. Chatou is a part of the affluent suburbs of western Paris and is on the northwest side of the Seine river about 14 km (9 mi) from the city's centre. It is on the departmental border with Hauts-de-Seine, which follows the Seine.

It is part of the Pays des Impressionnistes, who used to paint there. Pierre-Auguste Renoir described it as the "prettiest spot near Paris".

== History ==
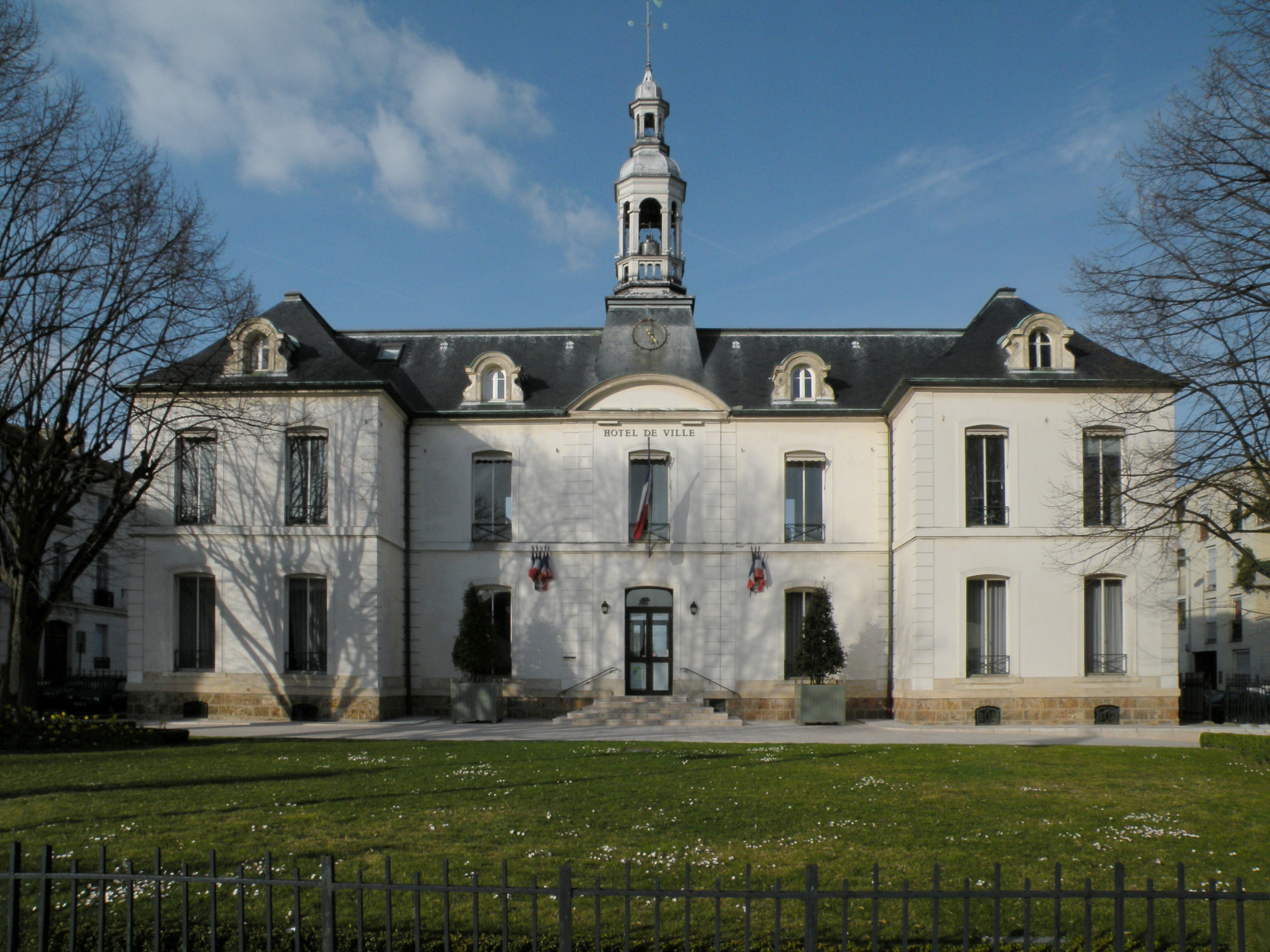
The Hôtel de Ville

The Hôtel de Ville was built as a private residence in 1730.

On 31 May 1875, part of the territory of Chatou was detached and merged with a part of the territory of Le Pecq and a part of the territory of Croissy-sur-Seine to create the commune of Le Vésinet. It boasts many bourgeois mansions of every kind of architecture and owned by private individuals.

Avenue Brimont

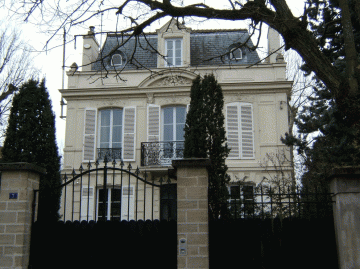
Front view

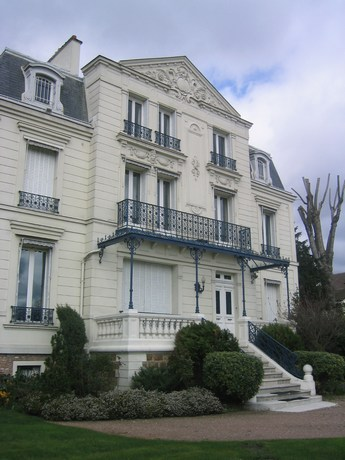
Rear view

Chatou is home to Maison Fournaise on the Île des Impressionnistes, formerly a meeting place for Impressionist painters on the Seine. It was a place where Pierre-Auguste Renoir painted numerous pieces (portraits of the Fournaise family, surrounding landscapes, etc.), most notably the Déjeuner des canotiers (Luncheon of the Boating Party) in 1881. The painting is today part of the Phillips Collection in Washington, DC.

With the opening of the Paris–Saint-Germain-en-Laye railway line in 1837, Parisians went for day trips to the banks of the Seine outside the city and took part in swimming and boating there; they frequented taverns and restaurants in the area, particularly in Chatou. The festive atmosphere inspired Impressionist painters such as Claude Monet, Edgar Degas, Alfred Sisley, Gustave Caillebotte and Renoir.

Maison Fournaise restaurant

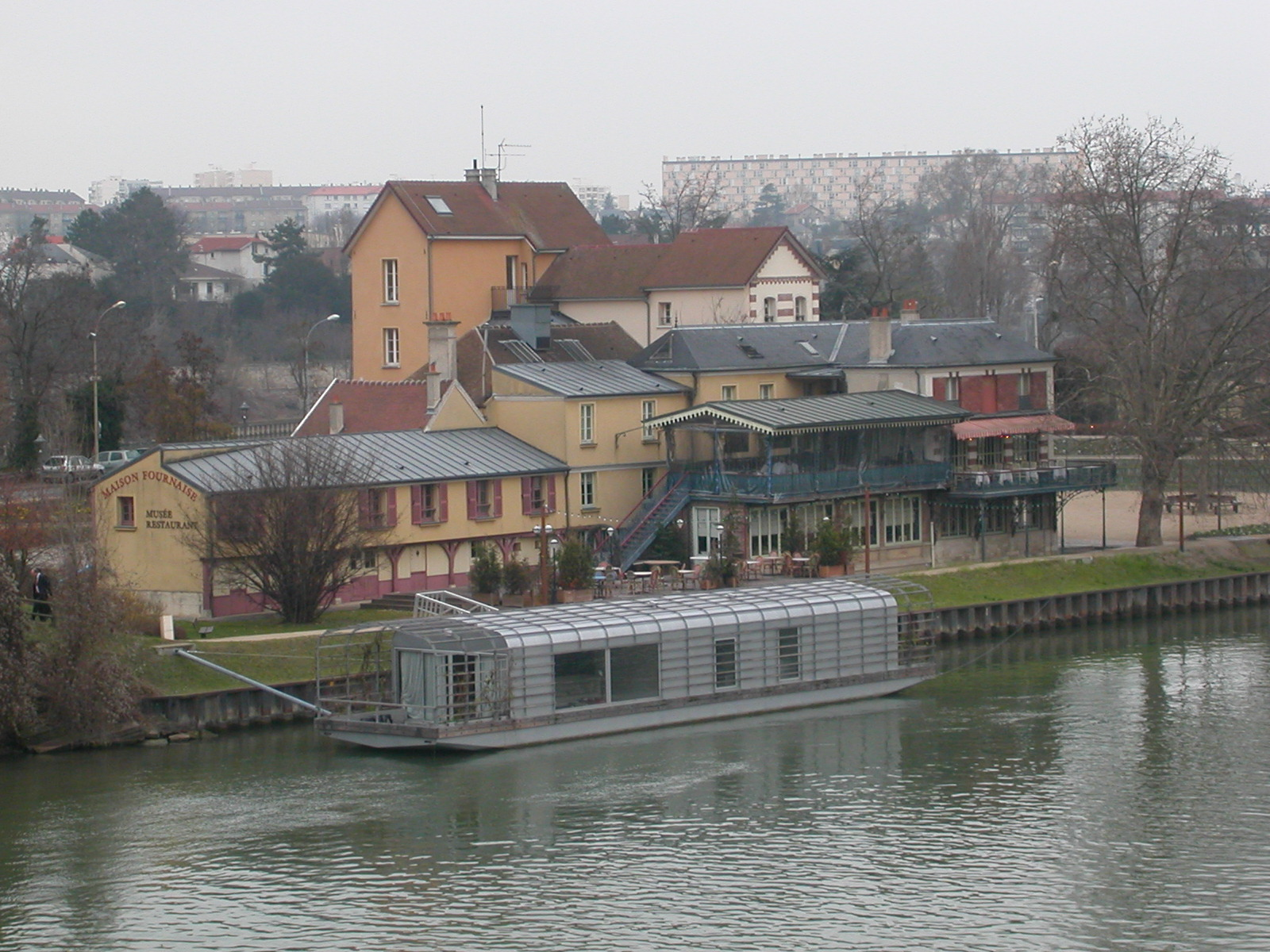
Surrounding area

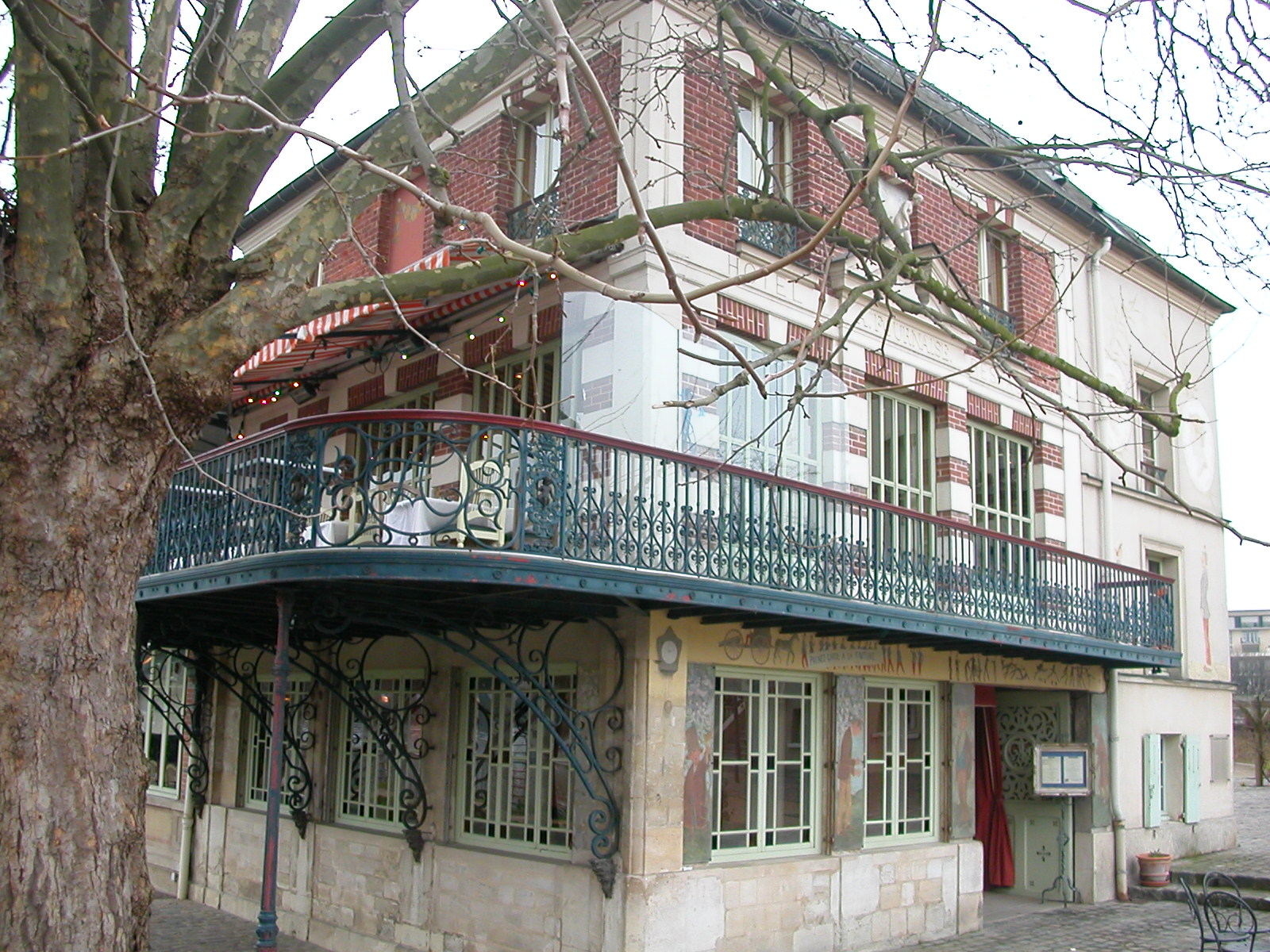
Front view

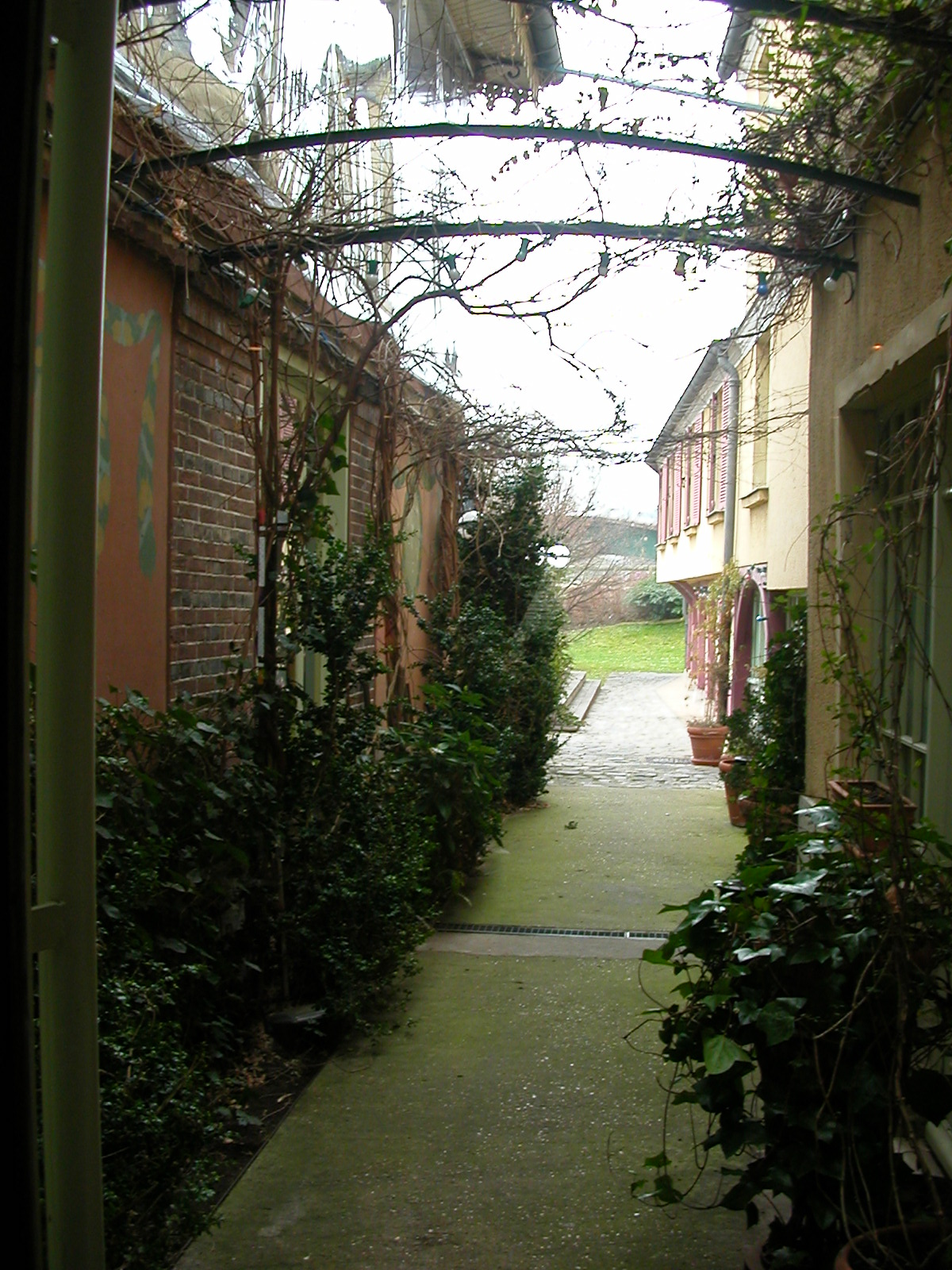
Side view

Paintings in Chatou by Renoir

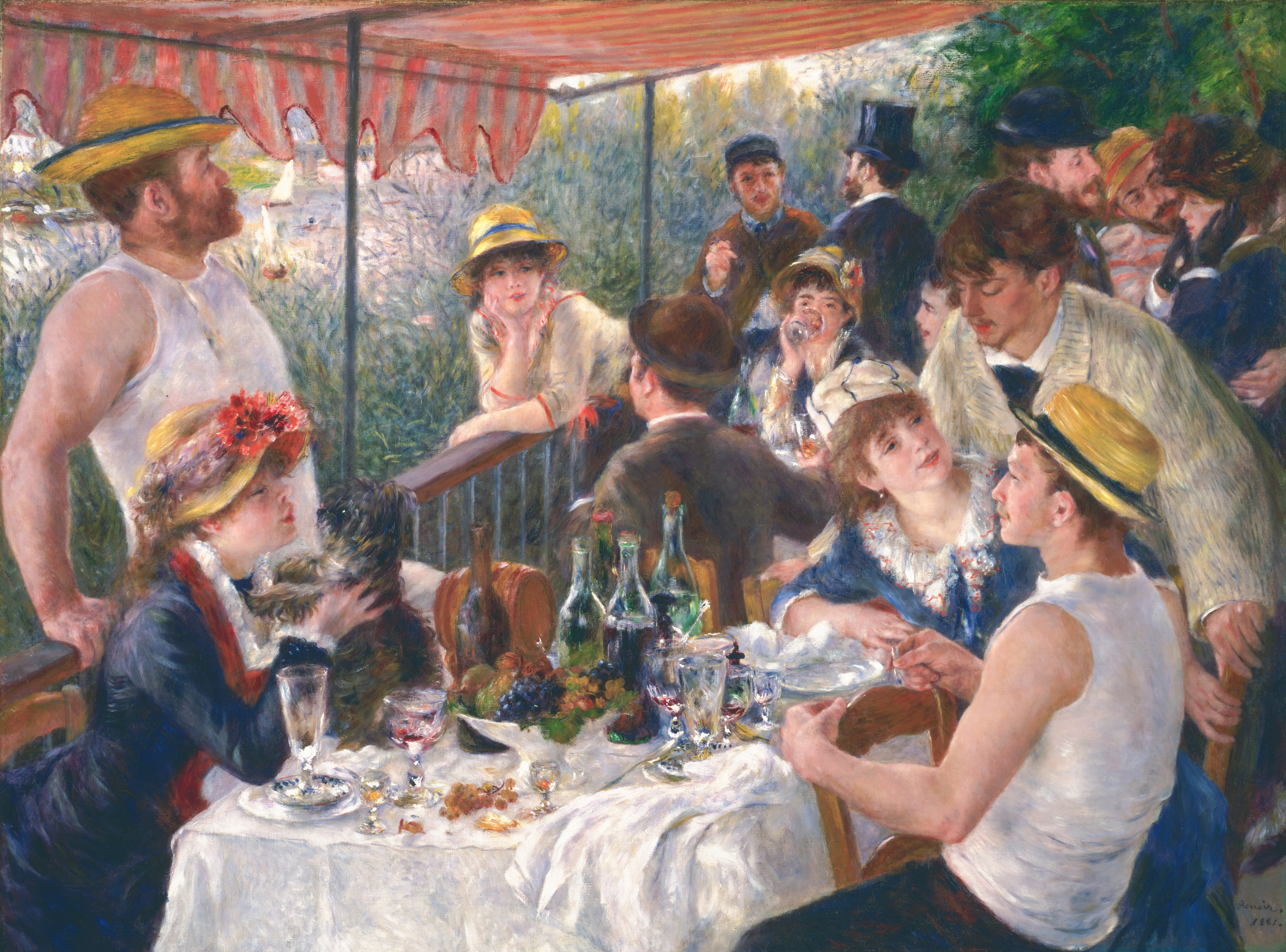
Luncheon of the Boating Party

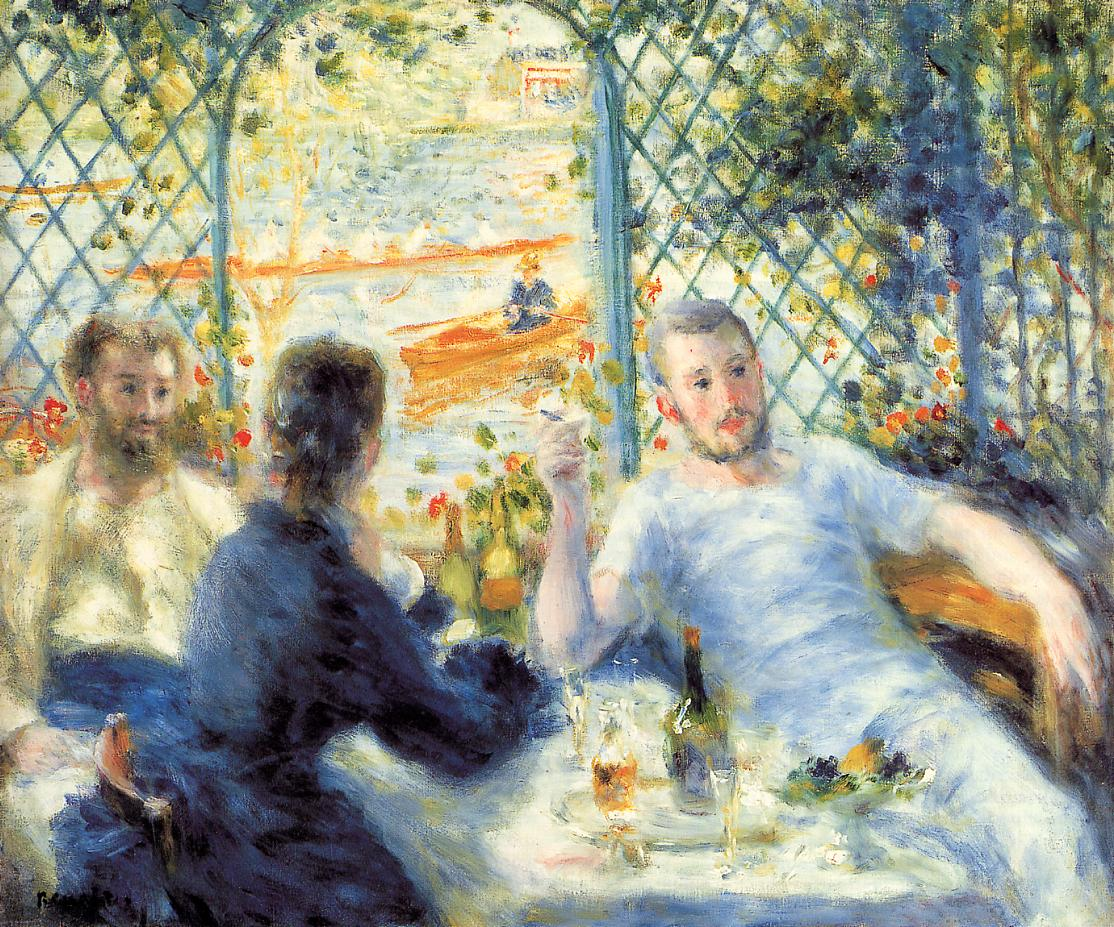
Lunch at the Restaurant Fournaise

On 25 August 1944, in Chatou, the Nazis shot 27 people, civilians and members of the French Resistance. This event is today known as the "Massacre des 27 Martyrs".

In 2024 the MACS MTO museum opened in Chatou, the world's first museum dedicated to Sufism.

== Population ==
Historical population

Year	Pop.	±% p.a.
1793	1,124	—
1800	926	−2.73%
1806	984	+1.02%
1821	993	+0.06%
1831	955	−0.39%
1836	1,027	+1.46%
1841	1,100	+1.38%
1846	1,200	+1.76%
1851	1,292	+1.49%
1856	1,422	+1.94%
1861	1,804	+4.87%
1866	2,662	+8.09%
1872	3,194	+3.08%
1876	2,956	−1.92%
1881	3,382	+2.73%
1886	3,921	+3.00%
1891	3,580	−1.80%
1896	4,171	+3.10%
1901	4,514	+1.59%

Year	Pop.	±% p.a.
1906	5,483	+3.97%
1911	6,532	+3.56%
1921	8,036	+2.09%
1926	9,757	+3.96%
1931	12,023	+4.27%
1936	11,861	−0.27%
1946	12,811	+0.77%
1954	15,338	+2.28%
1962	21,655	+4.41%
1968	22,619	+0.73%
1975	26,550	+2.32%
1982	28,437	+0.99%
1990	27,977	−0.20%
1999	28,588	+0.24%
2007	30,063	+0.63%
2012	30,585	+0.34%
2017	30,253	−0.22%
2023	30,598	+0.19%

Source: EHESS and INSEE (1968–2023)

== Transport ==
Chatou is served by Chatou–Croissy station on Île-de-France's RER Line A.

== Education ==
The community has eight public preschools, five public elementary schools, and two public junior high schools. Schools include:

Elementary:

- Les Champs-Moutons
- Jules Ferry
- Victor Hugo
- Jean Rostand
- Val Fleuri

Junior high schools:

- Collège Paul Bert
- Collège Auguste Renoir

There are also the following private schools:

- École Jeanne d'Arc / Notre-Dame (preschool and primary school)

Lycée Alain, a public senior high school/sixth form college; as well as Institut du Bon Sauveur, a private school with levels preschool through senior high/sixth form, are in nearby Le Vésinet.

== Parks and recreation ==
Parks include:

- Parc des Impressionnistes
- Parc Auguste Renoir
- Parc de l'Europe
- Jardin du Sentier de la Côte
- Square Émile Pathé
- Square Réalier-Dumas
- Hameau Fournaise, Île des Impressionnistes

== Notable people ==
- Virginie Augustin (born 1973), comic book artist
- Éric Dumoulin (born 1965), mayor of Chatou and senator

== See also ==
- Communes of the Yvelines department
