= Maison Fournaise =

Restaurant and museum west of Paris, France

Coordinates: 48°53′23″N 2°09′48″E

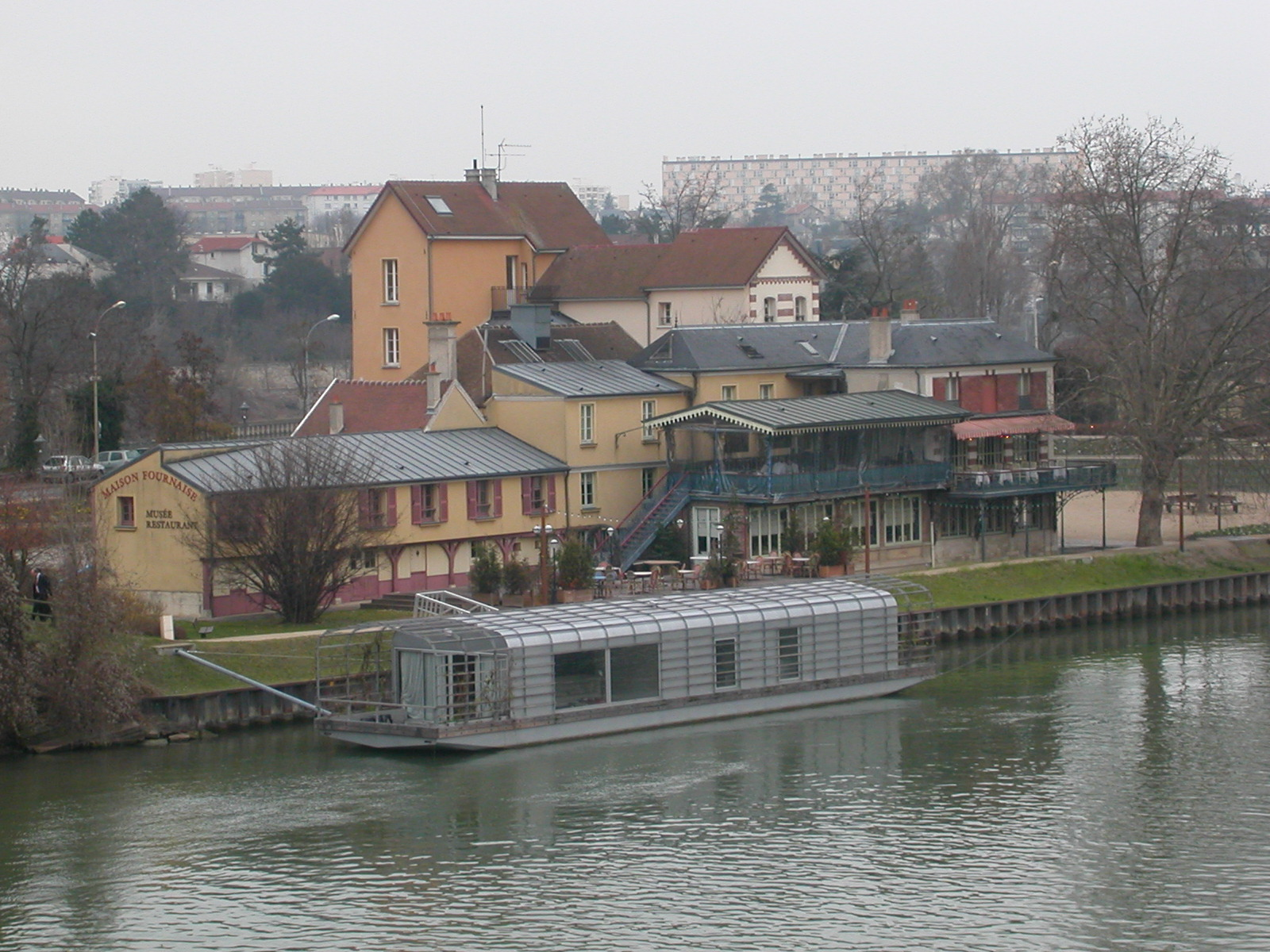
- Maison Fournaise in Chatou, west of Paris, France
- Interactive map of Maison Fournaise

Restaurant information
- Established: 1857; 169 years ago
- Previous owner: Alphonse Fournaise
- Location: Chatou, France

Maison Fournaise (French: [mɛzɔ̃ fuʁnɛz]; lit. 'Fournaise House') is a restaurant and museum located on the Île des Impressionnistes, a long island in Seine river in Chatou, west of Paris. It is best known for having been a painting place of Pierre-Auguste Renoir.

== History ==
In 1857, Alphonse Fournaise bought land in Chatou to open a boat rental, restaurant, and a small hotel for the new tourist trade.

Closed in 1906, the Maison Fournaise remained abandoned until it was restored in 1990 on the initiative of the town of Chatou, with the assistance of American private funds from the Friends of French Art.

The restaurant was meeting place of financial persons, politicians and painters of nearby places. At that time, impressionist artist liked this restaurant because it was situated close to the river, at this location reflection of sunshine on river's water made it a pleasant site, an open place with natural air.

The restaurant was a favorite of Pierre-Auguste Renoir, who painted scenes of the restaurant including Lunch at the Restaurant Fournaise or The Rowers' Lunch (1879, Déjeuner chez Fournaise, Déjeuner au Restaurant Fournaise, Le Déjeuner au bord de la rivière, or Déjeuner des Rameurs) and Luncheon of the Boating Party (1881, Le déjeuner des canotiers) as well as several portraits of Fournaise family members and landscapes of the surrounding area.

== Gallery ==
Maison Fournaise Restaurant

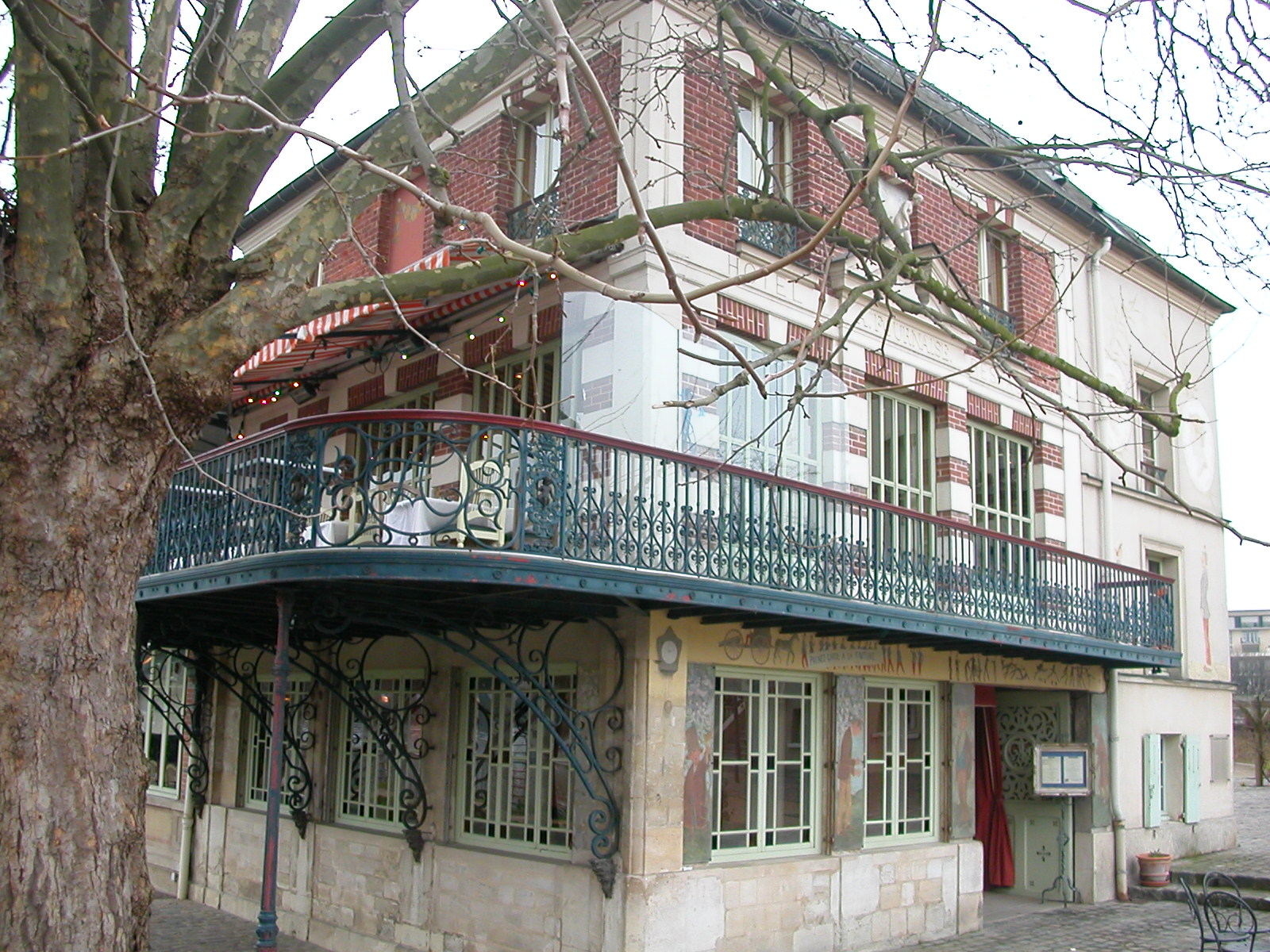
Front view

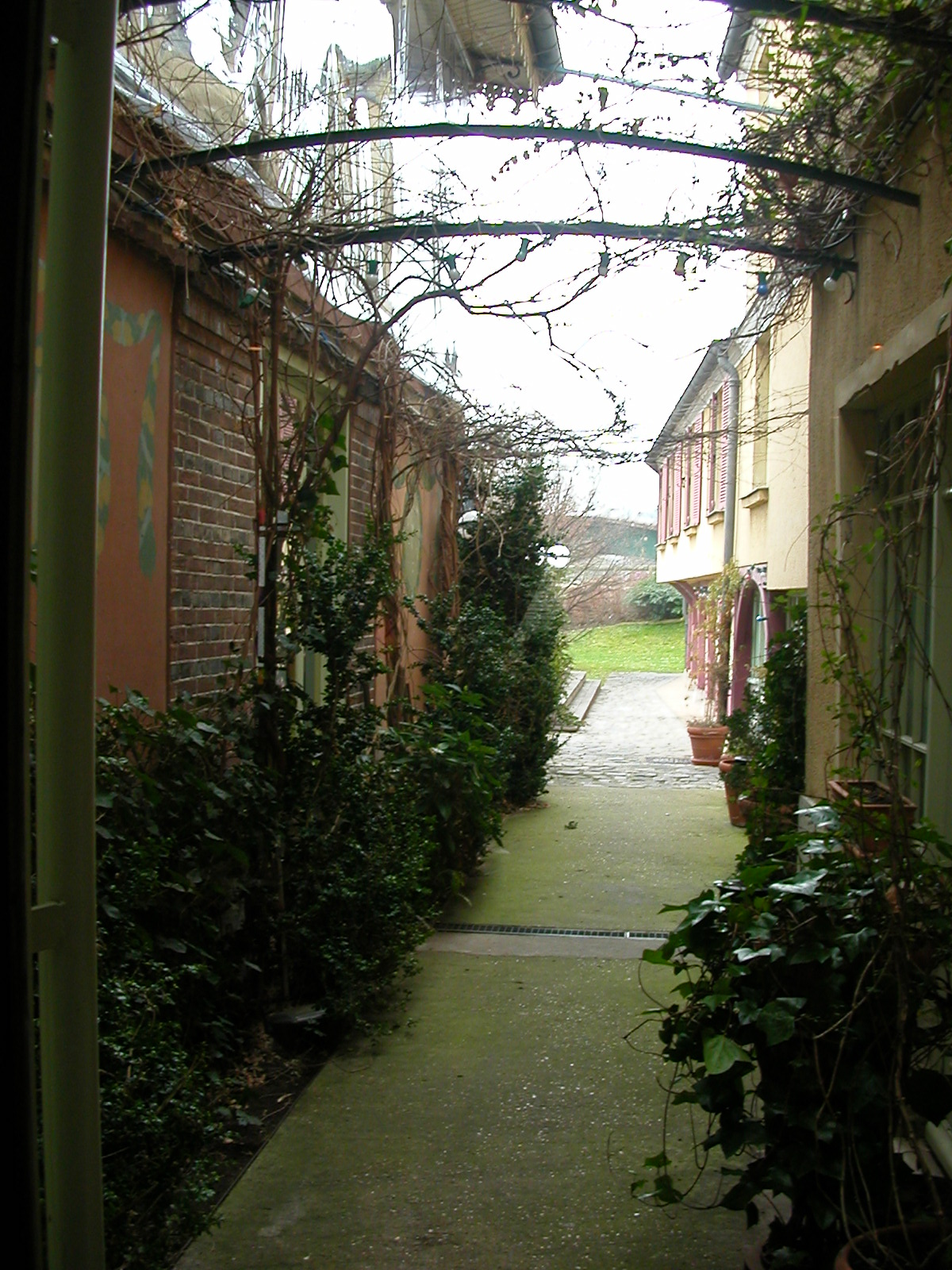
Side view

Paintings by Pierre-Auguste Renoir

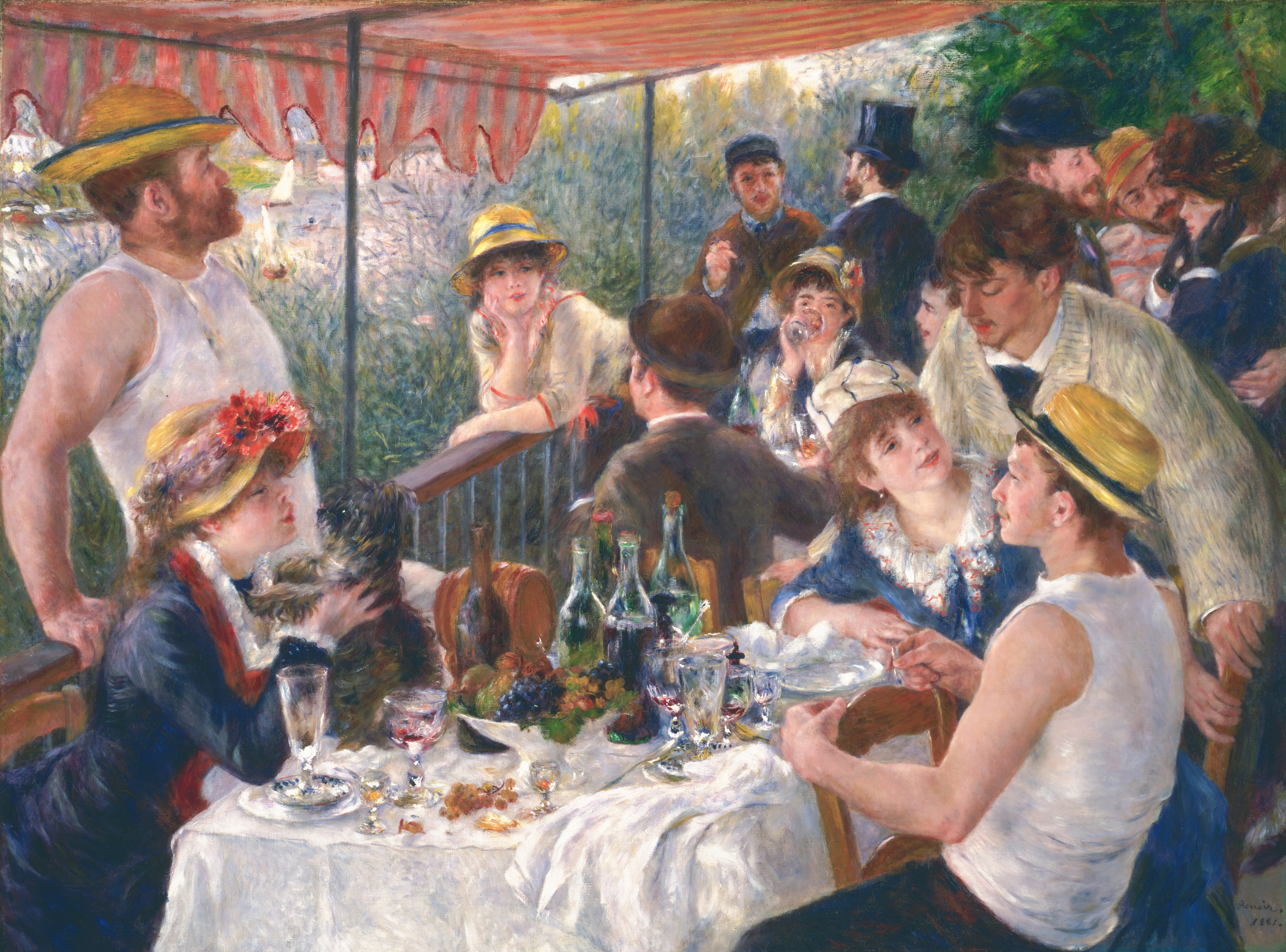
Luncheon of the Boating Party (1881)

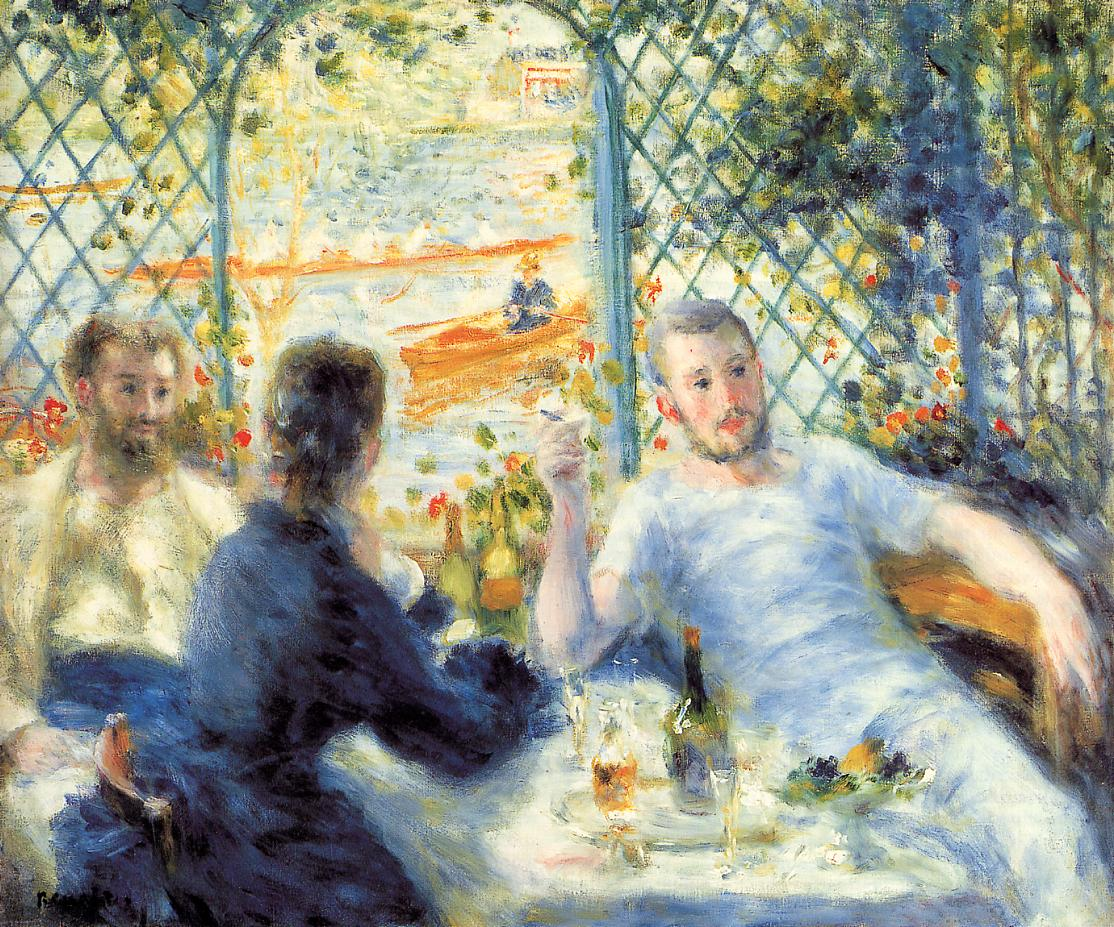
Lunch at the Restaurant Fournaise (1879)
