= Argenteuil – Boucles de Seine bus network =

French bus network

Argenteuil – Boucles de Seine
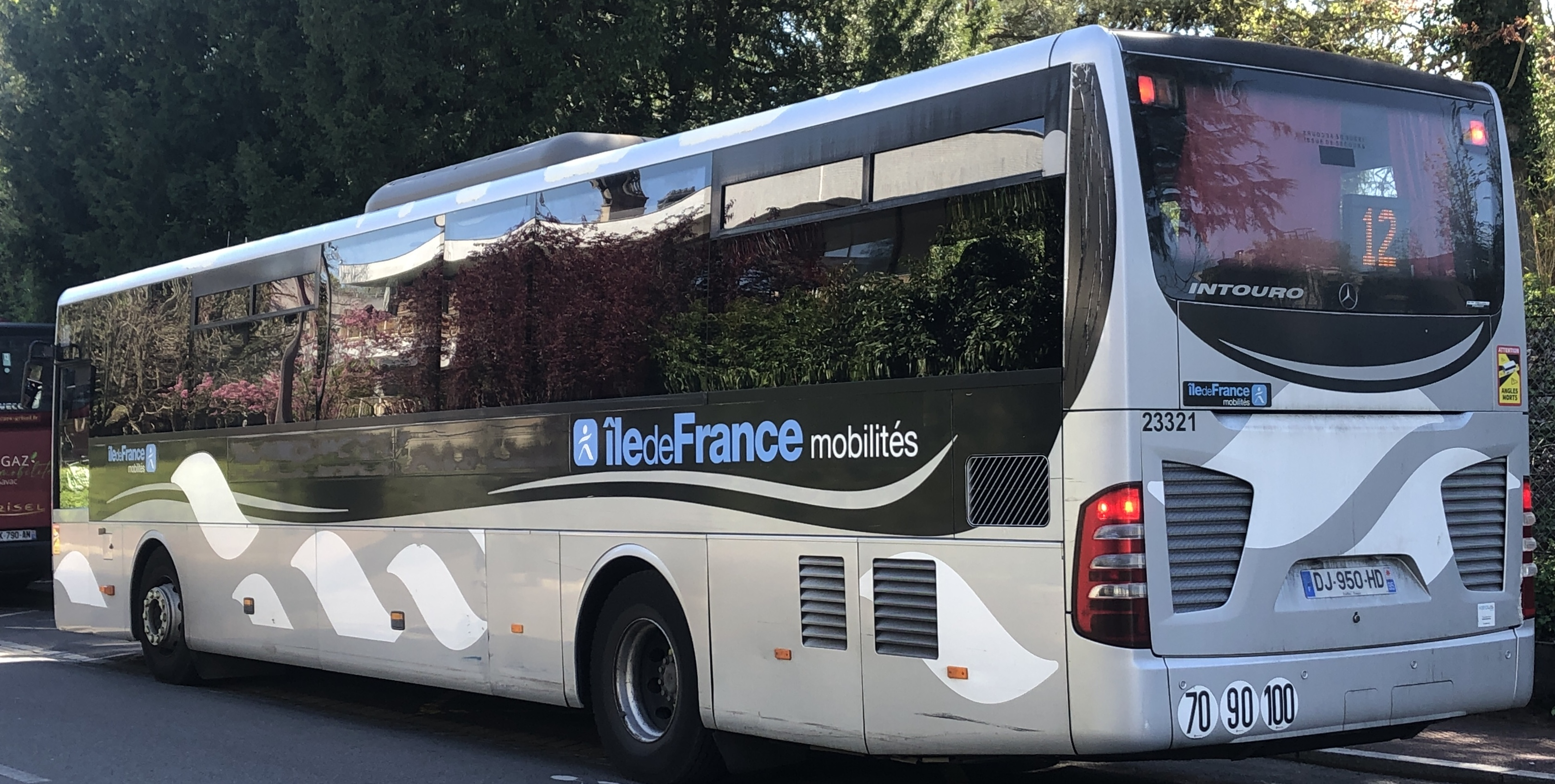
- Mercedes-Benz Intouro II L n°217345 on future line 6450 at Collège Passy-Buzenval, Rueil-Malmaison.
- Parent: Île-de-France Mobilités
- Founded: January 1, 2022
- Service area: Yvelines: (Bougival, Carrières-sur-Seine, La Celle-Saint-Cloud, Chatou, Le Chesnay-Rocquencourt, Croissy-sur-Seine, Houilles, Louveciennes, Maisons-Laffitte, Montesson, Le Mesnil-le-Roi, Le Pecq, Poissy, Le Port-Marly, Saint-Germain-en-Laye, Sartrouville, Le Vésinet); Hauts-de-Seine: (Ville-d'Avray, Marnes-la-Coquette, Saint-Cloud, Rueil-Malmaison, Suresnes); Seine-Saint-Denis: (Épinay-sur-Seine); Val-d'Oise: (Argenteuil, Bezons, Enghien-les-Bains, Cormeilles-en-Parisis, Sannois)
- Routes: 6401 6402 6403 6404 6405; 6411 6412 6413 6414 6415; 6416 6417 6418 6419 6420; 6421 6422 6423 6424 6425; 6426 6427 6428 6429 6430; 6431 6432 6433 6434 6435; 6436 6437 6438 6439 6450; 6451 6452 6454 6455 6456; 6457 6460 6461 6462 6463; 6464 6465 6466 6467 6468; 6470 6471 6472
- Operator: Keolis (Keolis Argenteuil Boucles de Seine)

Argenteuil – Boucles de Seine is a French bus network run by Île-de-France Mobilités, operated by Keolis through his subsidiary Keolis Argenteuil Boucles de Seine from January 1, 2022.

It consists of 53 lines serving the Communauté d'agglomération Saint Germain Boucles de Seine and the commune of Argenteuil.

== History ==
The first lines appeared during the 1980s into oldest networks R'Bus and Bus en Seine.

Following the opening to the competition of transports in Île-de-France, the bus lines of the two networks integrated the new network of Argenteuil – Boucles de Seine.

=== Network development ===
==== Development of lines of Bus en Seine ====
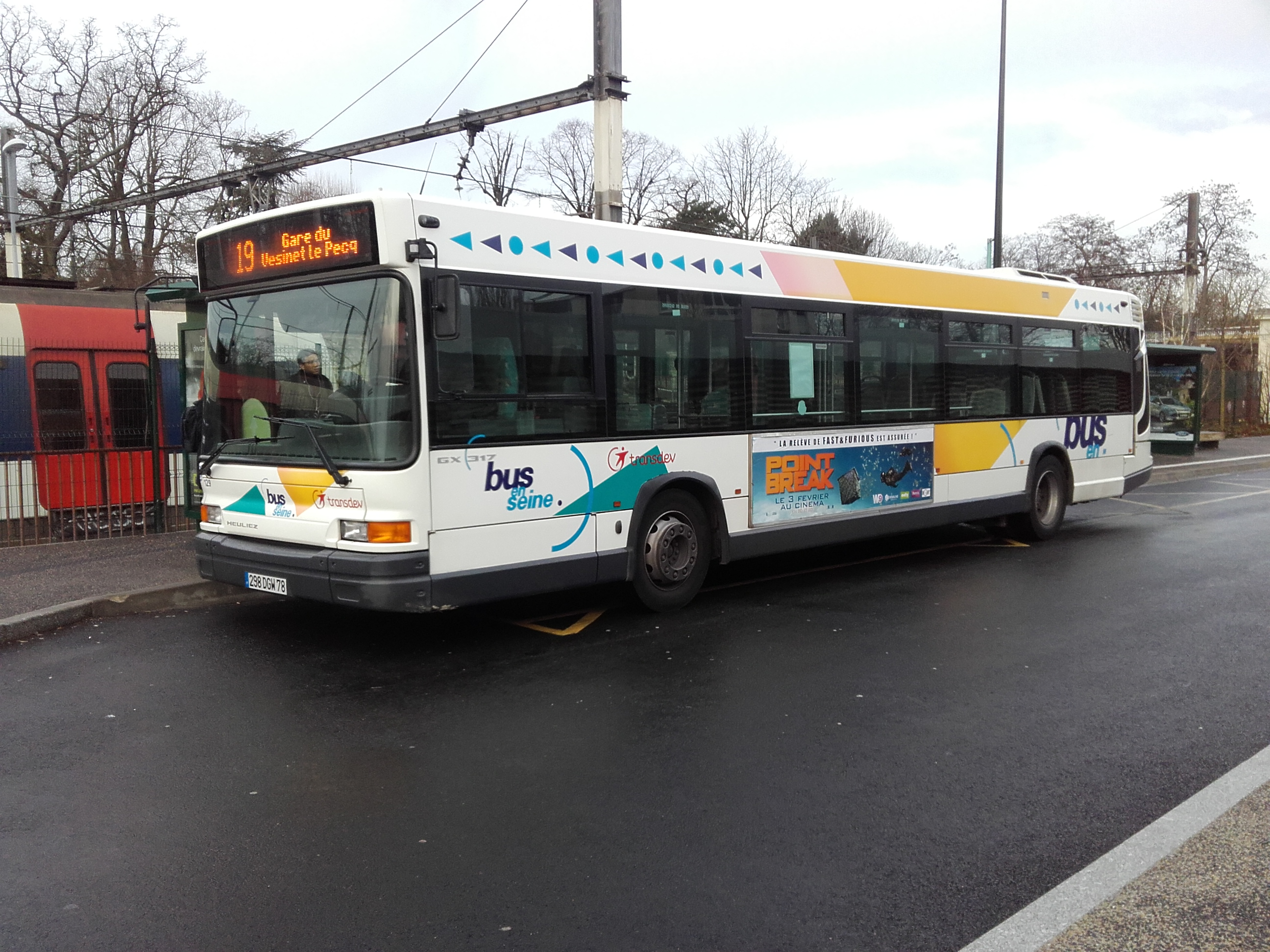
Heuliez GX 317 n°A129 of the line 19 in the Le Vésinet–Le Pecq station

The first lines of Bus en Seine were operated by Les Cars de Chatou, mainly serving the Yvelines commune of Chatou.

When CGEA acquired a stake in Les Cars de Chatou, his subsidiary CGEA Transport Centre de la Boucle was created to operate regular lines, with LCC retaining other types of service.

The TUB (Transports Urbains de la Boucle) network was then created and is managed by the SIVOM (Syndicat Intercommunal à Vocation Multiple) of Montesson.

In 2006, the Communauté d'agglomération Saint Germain Boucles de Seine (Carrières-sur-Seine, Chatou, Croissy-sur-Seine, Houilles, Le Pecq, Le Vésinet, Montesson, Sartrouville) was created.

From 2006 to 2022, many bus lines of Bus en Seine are created, disbanded or restructured:

- On August 28, 2006, the new line 20 was created serving the stations of Le Vésinet - Le Pecq, Le Vésinet - Centre and Chatou - Croissy.
- On January 8, 2007, the lines 8 and 11 were merged into a new line 19 between Le Vésinet - Le Pecq and Houilles - Carrières-sur-Seine stations, the number of services were also increased. An additionnal service was also added into the line 7.
- In 2007, due to the creation of the Communauté d'agglomération Saint Germain Boucles de Seine which includes the communes of Houilles and Sartrouville. The lines 23 and 25 of the TVO were transferred to Bus en Seine network.
- On September 1, 2008, the services of the lines of the network (with the exception of the lines 10 and 20) were extended to around 10 PM (22:00) from the stations served by the RER A which includes the line 7. In addition, four services were created into the line 3 towards Houilles–Carrières-sur-Seine station, and the line 19 earned a Saturday service with a bus each thirty minutes.
- On June 21, 2009, due to the Fête de la Musique, the services of the lines 3 and 19 were uninterrupted.
- On April 28, 2014, the line 7C is renamed and restructured.
- On September 1, 2014, the specific school bus lines are integrated into Bus en Seine, the lines C6, C7 and C8 were merged into a new line 26 serving the Lycée Les Pierres Vives of Carrières-sur-Seine, and the line 23 serves the Lycée Évariste Galois of Sartrouville.

On April 16, 2018, the network was restructured, and the lines abandoned their numerical indices in favor of letter indices, as shown in the table below:

Network renaming
Old	New
2; 4	T
3	A L
4SC	S3
6	E
7	B
7SC	S1; S2; S7
7SG	Ceased to exist
10	K
10SC	S4; S5
17	D
19	C F P
20	M
22	G
23	J
25H	H
25S	Ceased to exist
26	S6

==== Development of lines of R'Bus (TVO) ====
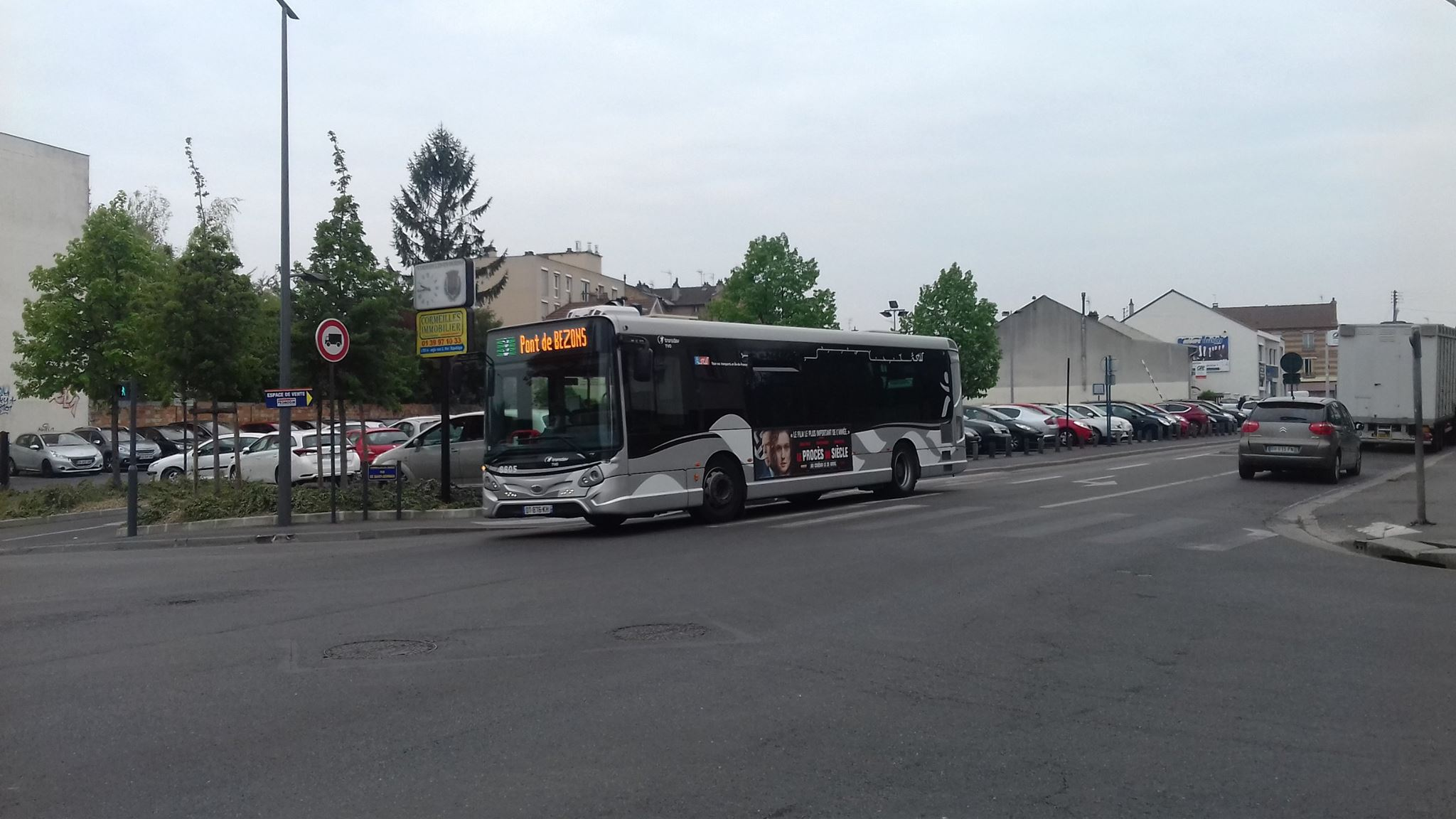
Heuliez GX 137 L n°8805 of the line 3 in Cormeilles-en-Parisis.

On May 11, 1985, the R'Bus network started his operations.

Due to declining traffic during the second half of the 1990s, the communes of Argenteuil, Bezons and Sartrouville and the transport operator entered into a "progress contract" in partnership with the STIF.

On September 16, 1996, the network was restructured:

- The line 1 is modified to serve the "Vieux Pays" of Sartrouville, including the "Centre commercial du Plateau" and the "Cité des Indes".
- The line 30.19 is created, corresponding to the extension of the line 30.05 between Cormeilles-en-Parisis and Sartouville stations. The line is operated by Transports du Val d'Oise (TVO) and Cars Lacroix.

On August 26, 2002, the network was restructured again with modifications:

- The line 35 (between Argenteuil — Poste du Val and Argenteuil — Place Chauvelot) ceased to exist due to poor traffic (only eleven passengers each day).
- The line 514 is limited to Bezons - La Berthie, his abandoned route is taken over by the line 24 to Houilles–Carrières-sur-Seine station.
- The line 5 is extended to Parc d'Activités des Perriers.
- The line 9 is equipped with articulated buses.

On August 24, 2009, the network is restructured:

- The line PAVA is created.
- The line 34 is modified to serve "Les Coteaux d'Argenteuil".

On August 23, 2010, the network is restructured with new stops added on two lines:

- The line 1 is modified with two stops changing their names, two stops are also created.
- The line PAVA is also modified with the creation of a new stop and the moving of one stop.

On August 22, 2011, the line 5 is extended to Parc d'activités des Trembleaux.

On November 19, 2012, due to the inauguration of the extension of the Tramway line 2 to Pont de Bezons, the network is restructured again with many changements:

- The line 3 is created between Sartrouville - Sureaux and Pont de Bezons serving the Agriculture zone of Argenteuil.
- The line 4 merged with the line 24. who is extended to Houilles–Carrières-sur-Seine station.
- The line 6 merged with the line 92, the abandoned route of the line 92 is transferred to the line 6.
- The line 9 abandoned his service of the Quartier Voltaire of Sartrouville, transferred to the RATP bus line 272, his partial services were also removed.
- The line 34 merged with the line 363 of the RATP, who is extended to Houilles–Carrières-sur-Seine station, and the Lycée Les Pierres Vives of Carrières-sur-Seine during school days.
- The line 514 is restructured, many of his services are transferred to the lines 4 and 9.

On July 15, 2013, the STIF votes the restructuring of the lines 8, 34 and 514.

On September 1, 2014, the line 1 has seen its service increased from Monday to Saturday, its opening hours extended in the evening, and the creation of a service on Sundays and public holidays.

On December 17, 2014, following the inauguration of the Tramway line 8, the line 514 is renamed to line 7. His services are modified to serve the terminus of the T8 in Épinay-sur-Seine.

On March 2, 2015, the network is restructured with many changes:

- The line 3 is extended to La Frette–Montigny station, his services are increased during the rush hours with a bus each fifteen minutes.
- The line PAVA is renamed to line 17.

On April 16, 2018, the line 34 abandoned his service towards Houilles–Carrières-sur-Seine station and the Lycée Les Pierres Vives of Carrières-sur-Seine, his services are transferred to the new line H of the Bus en Seine network.

=== Opening to the competition ===
Due to the opening to the competition of public transport in Île-de-France, Argenteuil – Boucles de Seine was founded on January 1, 2022, corresponding to public service delegation number 33 established by Île-de-France Mobilités.

A call for tenders was therefore launched by the organizing authority to designate a company that will operate the network for a period of five years. It was finally Keolis who gain the operation, through his subsidiary Keolis Argenteuil Boucles de Seine, which was designated during the board of directors on February 11, 2021.

At the time of its opening to the competition, the network consisted of the lines shown in the table below:

List of the lines of Argenteuil – Boucles de Seine
Oldest network	Lines
Bus en Seine	A, B, C, D, E, F, G, H, J, K, L, M, P, T, S1, S2, S3, S4, S5, S6, S7
Entre Seine et Forêt	20
R'Bus	1, 2, 3, 4, 5, 6, 7, 8, 9, 17, 18, 34, 501, 502, 503
Transdev Conflans	2, 6, 12
Transdev Montesson La Boucle	1, 2, 56, 57
Transdev Nanterre	37, 40

However, the network face many issues like the lack of bus drivers causing the cancellation of many services, or the inappropriate behavior of these drivers. These situations forced the members of the communauté d'agglomération Saint-Germain Boucles de Seine, angry with the operator Keolis to request the application of penalties, they also requested a meeting with the CEO of Île-de-France Mobilités in order to find a solution.

On June 30, 2023, some shuttles were restructured:

- The Navette du Vesinet who started his operations few months ago, ceased his operations due to the poor traffic.
- The Navette d'Houilles started his operations before being integrated to the network as the line N.

On September 2, 2024, the specific school bus lines of the Lycée Évariste Galois of Sartrouville were replaced by four lines (60 to 63).

On March 3, 2025, the line 262 of the RATP was integrated to the network.

==== Restructuration of the network ====
In September 2025, the network was scheduled to be restructured with the renaming of the lines. However, the restructuration was delayed.

On May 21, 2026, a new announcement made by Île-de-France Mobilités confirmed that the lines will be renamed on July 6, 2026.

The new lines will all begin with the prefix "64", followed by the last two digits of the old number, as soon as possible.

The correspondence between old and new numbers is as follows:

Network renaming
Old	New
9	6401
7	6402
8	6403
A	6404
C	6405
1A	6411
2M	6412
3	6413
4	6414
F	6415
6A	6416
B	6417
18	6418
262	6419
20	6420
D	6421
22	6422
2A	6423
H	6424
34	6425
26	6426
T	6427
6M	6428
G	6429
E	6430
1S	6431
12M	6432
J	6433
L	6434
P	6435
K	6436
17	6437
N	6438
M	6439
12S	6450
37	6451
40	6452
S4	6454
S5	6455
56	6456
57	6457
60	6460
61	6461
62	6462
63	6463
501	6464
502	6465
503	6466
S2	6467
S7	6468
S3	6470
S1	6471
S6	6472

== Routes ==
=== Main routes ===
Image	Line	First direction	Second direction
	6401	Gare d'Argenteuil	Gare de Sartrouville
	6402	Gare d'Argenteuil	Gare d'Enghien-les-Bains
	6403	Gare d'Argenteuil	Argenteuil – Bérionne
	6404	Gare d'Houilles - Carrières-sur-Seine	Gare du Vésinet - Le Pecq
	6405	Gare d'Houilles - Carrières-sur-Seine	Gare du Vésinet - Le Pecq
	6411	Gare d'Argenteuil	Gare de Sartrouville
	6412	Gare de Maisons-Laffitte	Gare de Saint-Germain-en-Laye
	6413	Gare de Corneilles-en-Parisis	Pont de Bezons
	6414	Gare d'Argenteuil	Gare d'Houilles - Carrières-sur-Seine
	6415	Gare du Vésinet - Le Pecq	Montesson – La Tour
	6416	Gare d'Argenteuil	Gare d'Houilles - Carrières-sur-Seine
	6417	Gare de Rueil-Malmaison	Gare de Sartrouville
	6418	Gare d'Argenteuil	Argenteuil – Champagne-Roussillon
	6419	Gare de Maisons-Laffitte	Pont de Bezons
	6420	Gare du Vésinet - Le Pecq	Gare du Vésinet - Centre
	6421	Gare du Chatou - Croissy	Le Chesnay-Rocquencourt – Centre Commercial Parly 2
	6422	Gare d'Argenteuil	Sannois – Le Moulin
	6423	Gare d'Houilles - Carrières-sur-Seine	Bezons – Plateau
	6424	Gare d'Houilles - Carrières-sur-Seine	Argenteuil – Marché des Coteaux
	6425	Gare de Sartrouville (circular line)	
	6426	Gare de Sartrouville (circular line)	
	6427	Gare du Chatou - Croissy	Chatou – Place du Docteur Roux
	6428	Gare de Maisons-Laffitte (circular line)	
	6429	Gare du Vésinet - Le Pecq	Gare de Sartrouville
	6430	Gare du Chatou - Croissy	Gare du Vésinet - Centre
	6431	Gare de Rueil-Malmaison; Carrières-sur-Seine - Église Réveil-Matin	Gare de Saint-Germain-en-Laye; Saint-Germain-en-Laye – Lycée Internationnal
	6432	Gare de Maisons-Laffitte (circular line)	
	6433	Gare d'Houilles - Carrières-sur-Seine	Gare de Sartrouville
	6434	Gare d'Houilles - Carrières-sur-Seine	Chatou – Mayoly
	6435	Gare d'Houilles - Carrières-sur-Seine	Montesson – Berges
	6436	Gare d'Houilles - Carrières-sur-Seine	Houilles – ZI Les Amandiers
	6437	Gare du Val d'Argenteuil	Val d'Argenteuil – Parc d'Activités
	6438	Houilles – Mairie	Houilles – Place du 14 Juillet
	6439	Gare du Vésinet - Le Pecq	Gare du Chatou - Croissy
	6450	Rueil-Malmaison – Saint CUCUFA; Rueil-Malmaison – Collège Passy-Buzenval	Croissy-sur-Seine – Verdun; Chatou – Landes; Le Vésinet – Charmettes
	6451	Rueil-Malmaison – Saint CUCUFA; Rueil-Malmaison – Collège Passy-Buzenval	Ville d'Avray – Fausses Reposes
	6452	Rueil-Malmaison – Saint CUCUFA; Rueil-Malmaison – Collège Passy-Buzenval	Suresnes – Pompidou; Suresnes – Commandant Rivière
	6454	Carrières-sur-Seine – Collège Les Amandiers	Carrières-sur-Seine – Montceau
	6455	Carrières-sur-Seine – Collège Les Amandiers	Carrières-sur-Seine – Piscine
	6456	Saint-Germain-en-Laye – Lycée International	Bougival – Pont; Croissy-sur-Seine – Les Moulins
	6457	Le Chesnay-Rocquencourt – Hôpital André Mignot; Le Chesnay-Rocquencourt – Les Chênes d'Or	Le Port-Marly – Saint-Fiacre; Le Port-Marly – Marly Soleil
	6460	Sartrouville – Lycée Évariste Galois	Maisons-Laffitte – Eugène Adam
	6461	Sartrouville – Lycée Évariste Galois	Maisons-Laffitte – Place Napoléon
	6462	Sartrouville – Lycée Évariste Galois	Maisons-Laffitte – Rue du Tir; Maisons-Laffitte – République
	6463	Sartrouville – Lycée Évariste Galois	Maisons-Laffitte – Eugène Adam; Maisons-Laffitte – République
	6464	Sartrouville – Lycée Évariste Galois	Sartrouville – Boulevard des Bezons
	6465	Sartrouville – Lycée Évariste Galois	Sartrouville – Barian
	6466	Sartrouville – Lycée Évariste Galois	Sartrouville – Romain Rolland
	6467	Sartrouville – Lycée Évariste Galois	Montesson – Berges
	6468	Sartrouville – Lycée Évariste Galois	Montesson – Théophile Roussel
	6470	Chatou – Collège Paul Bert	Chatou – Cormeilles
	6471	Montesson – Collège Pablo Picasso	Gare de Sartrouville
	6472	Carrières-sur-Seine – Lycée Les Pierres Vives	Houilles – Martyrs

== Gallery ==
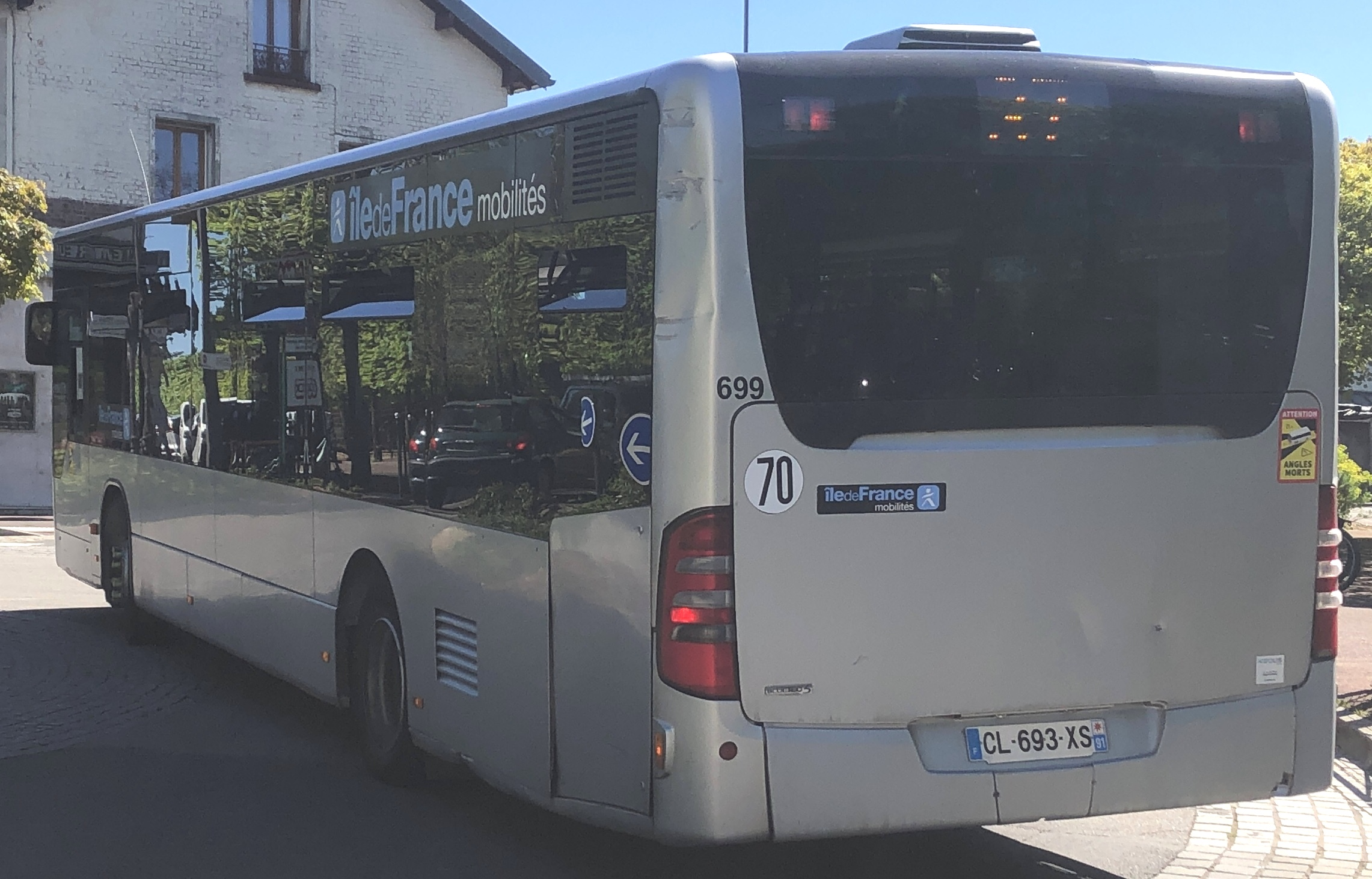
Mercedes-Benz Citaro Facelift n°211505 on the future line 6451, at Collège - Passy Buzenval, Rueil-Malmaison

== See also ==
- Île-de-France Mobilités
