= Le Vésinet–Centre station =

Railway station in Le Vésinet, France

Le Vésinet–Centre
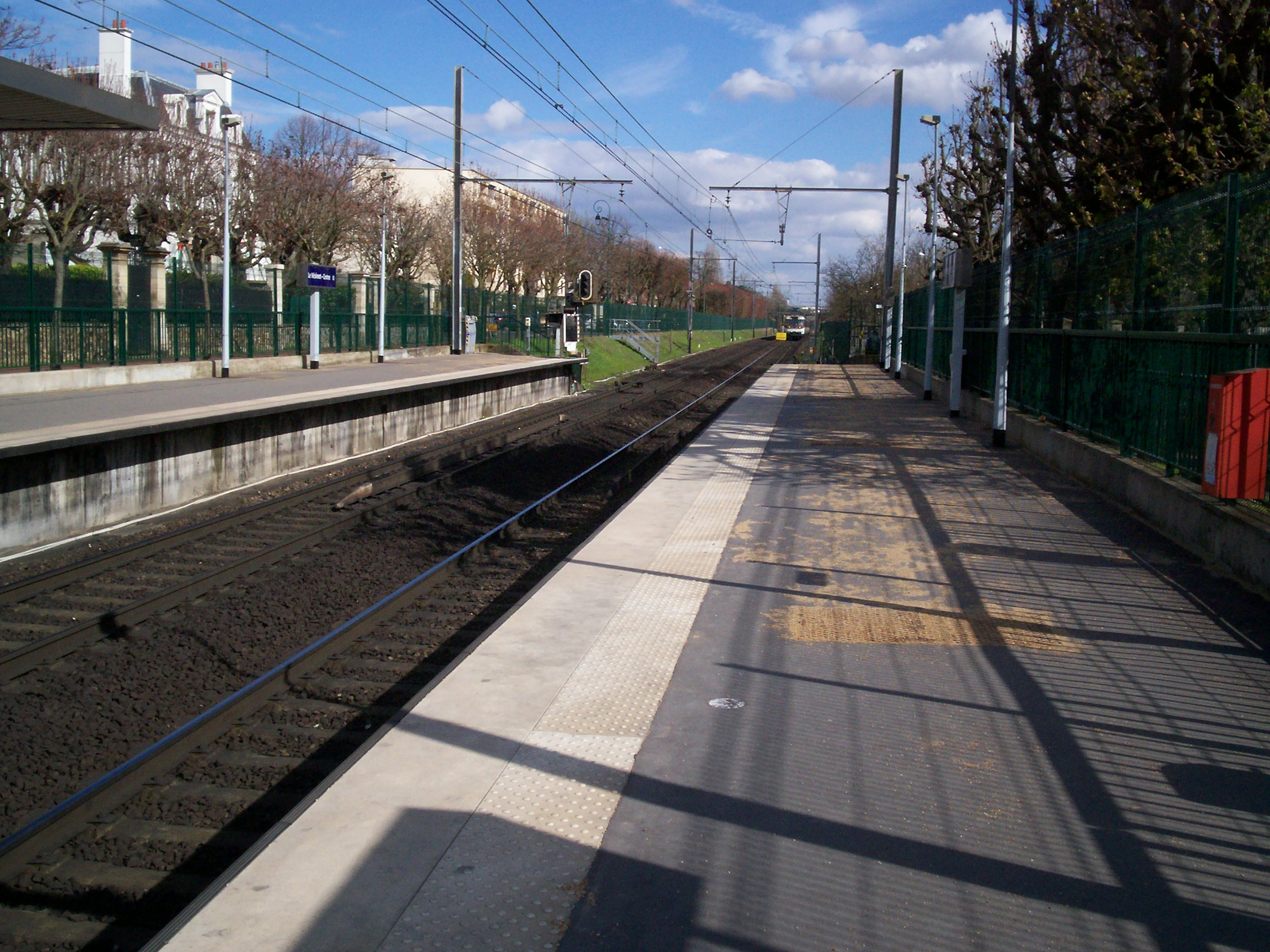
- Vésinet–Centre station platforms

General information
- Location: Le Vésinet; France
- Coordinates: 48°53′24″N 2°08′02″E
- Operator: RATP Group
- Platforms: 2 side platforms
- Tracks: 2
- Connections: Bus en Seine: 6A, 6B, 6C, 20

Construction
- Structure type: At-grade
- Accessible: Yes, by request to staff

Other information
- Station code: 87758078
- Fare zone: 4

History
- Opened: 26 August 1837

Services
Preceding station	RER	Following station
Le Vésinet–Le Pecq towards Saint-Germain-en-Laye	RER A	Chatou–Croissy towards Boissy-Saint-Léger
Location

Le Vésinet–Centre station is a railway station in Le Vésinet, a suburb about 16 kilometres (9.9 mi) west of central Paris. Vésinet–Centre station uses a basic RER station setup with two tracks and two side platforms.

== History ==
The station opened in 1860 on the first railway line on the Île-de-France region. Built in 1837, the Paris–Saint-Germain-en-Laye railway was initially limited to a line from Paris to the Seine at Le Pecq, since the grade to its intended terminus on the other side of the river at Saint-Germain-en-Laye was too steep for the locomotives of the time. A new Le Pecq station was built in 1847. However, this Le Pecq station was actually in the western section of Le Vésinet. In 1860 another station was built near the center of Le Vésinet. The older station became Le Pecq–Le Vésinet in 1936, but resumed the Le Pecq name in 1942. In 1972, when the line came under the control of the RATP as RER Line A, the present station was constructed and the two stations were named Le Vésinet–Le Pecq and Le Vésinet–Centre.

== Service ==
Le Vésinet–Centre is on the A1 branch of the RER A. Therefore, westbound services always terminate at Saint-Germain-en-Laye whilst eastbound ones travel to downtown Paris and Boissy-Saint-Léger on the A2 branch. Passengers must switch at Vincennes for trains to Marne-la-Vallée – Chessy on the A4 branch. In general, evening service arrives every 15 minutes, off-peak service arrives at 10-minute intervals, and at peak hours trains come every six minutes.
