= Argenteuil station =

Railway station in Argenteuil, France

Coordinates: 48°56′49″N 2°15′26″E

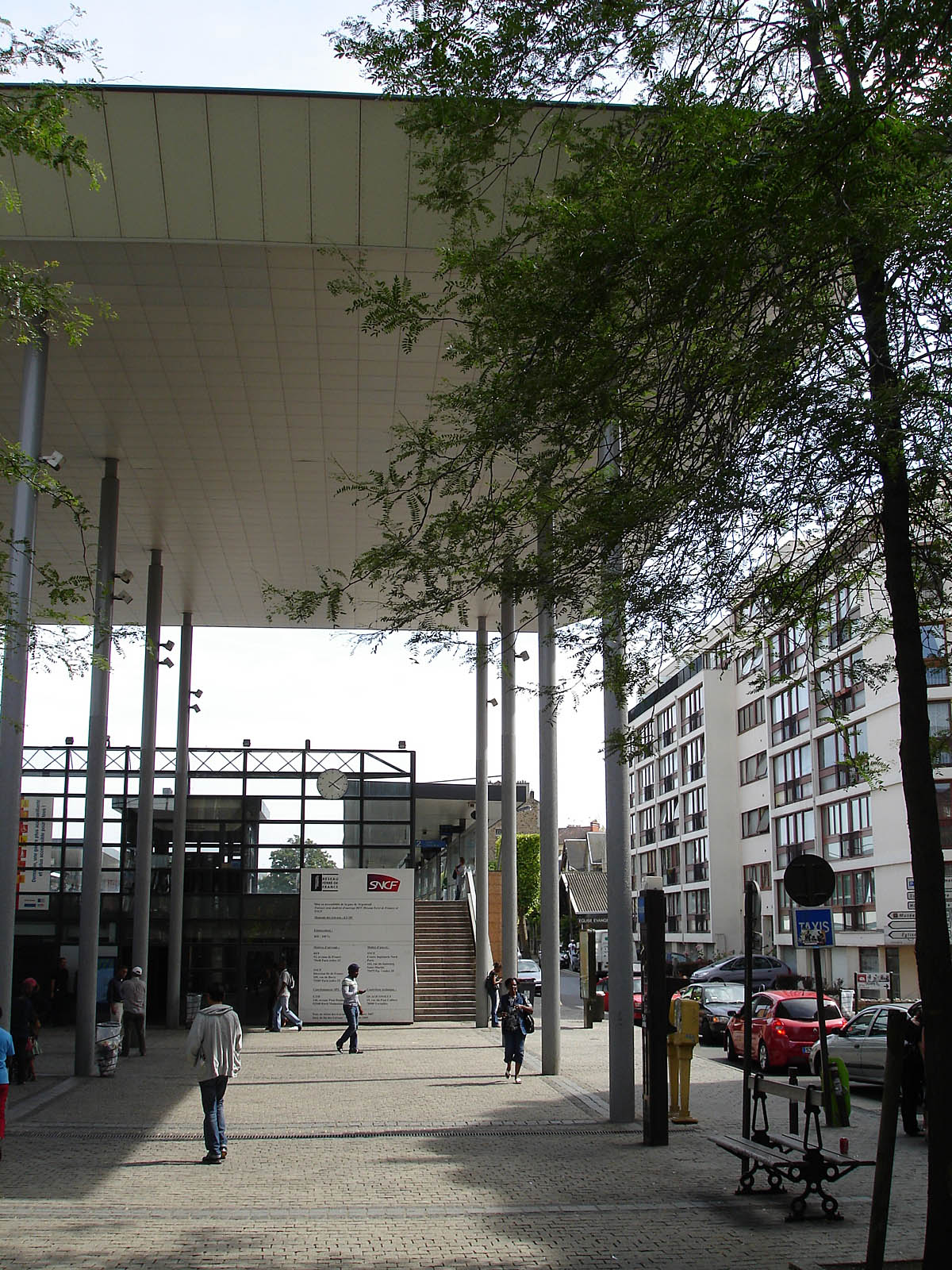
- The station

General information
- Location: France

Passengers
- 2024: 17,548,229

Services
| Preceding station | Transilien | Following station |
|---|---|---|
| Le Stade towards Paris-St.-Lazare | Line J | Sannois towards Ermont–Eaubonne |
| Le Stade towards Paris-St.-Lazare | Line J | Val d'Argenteuil towards Gisors or Mantes-la-Jolie |
Trains from Mantes, Gisors or Pontoise are direct to Paris.
Location

Argenteuil is a French railway station in Argenteuil, a northwestern suburb of Paris, France.

The station is operated by the SNCF (Société nationale des chemins de fer français) and served by trains of the Transilien Line J.

== Location ==
The station is established at an altitude of 36 meters and located at kilometric point (PK) 9.971 of Paris–Mantes-Station line (via Conflans-Sainte-Honorine).

== History ==
=== First station of Argenteuil ===
In 1851, the compagnie du chemin de fer de Paris à Saint-Germain opened a new line between Asnières-sur-Seine and Argenteuil. To get to Paris-Saint-Lazare, people need to cross the Pont d'Argenteuil to reach the railway terminal located in Gennevilliers, on the border with Colombes.

In 1855, the company merged with others to form the Compagnie des chemins de fer de l'Ouest.

=== Second station of Argenteuil ===
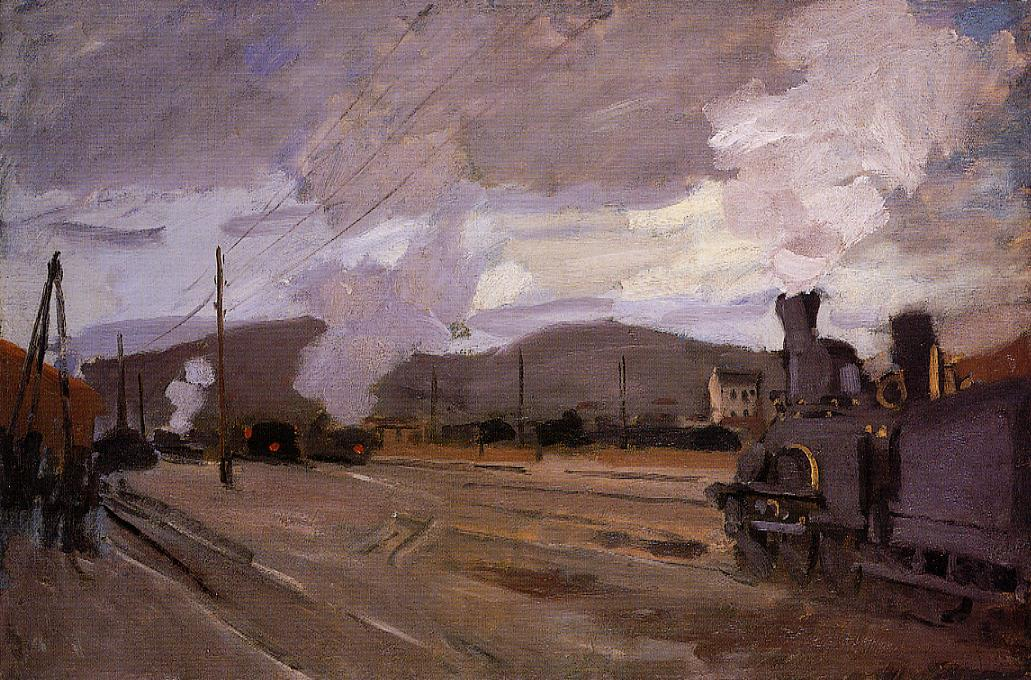
The station in 1872.

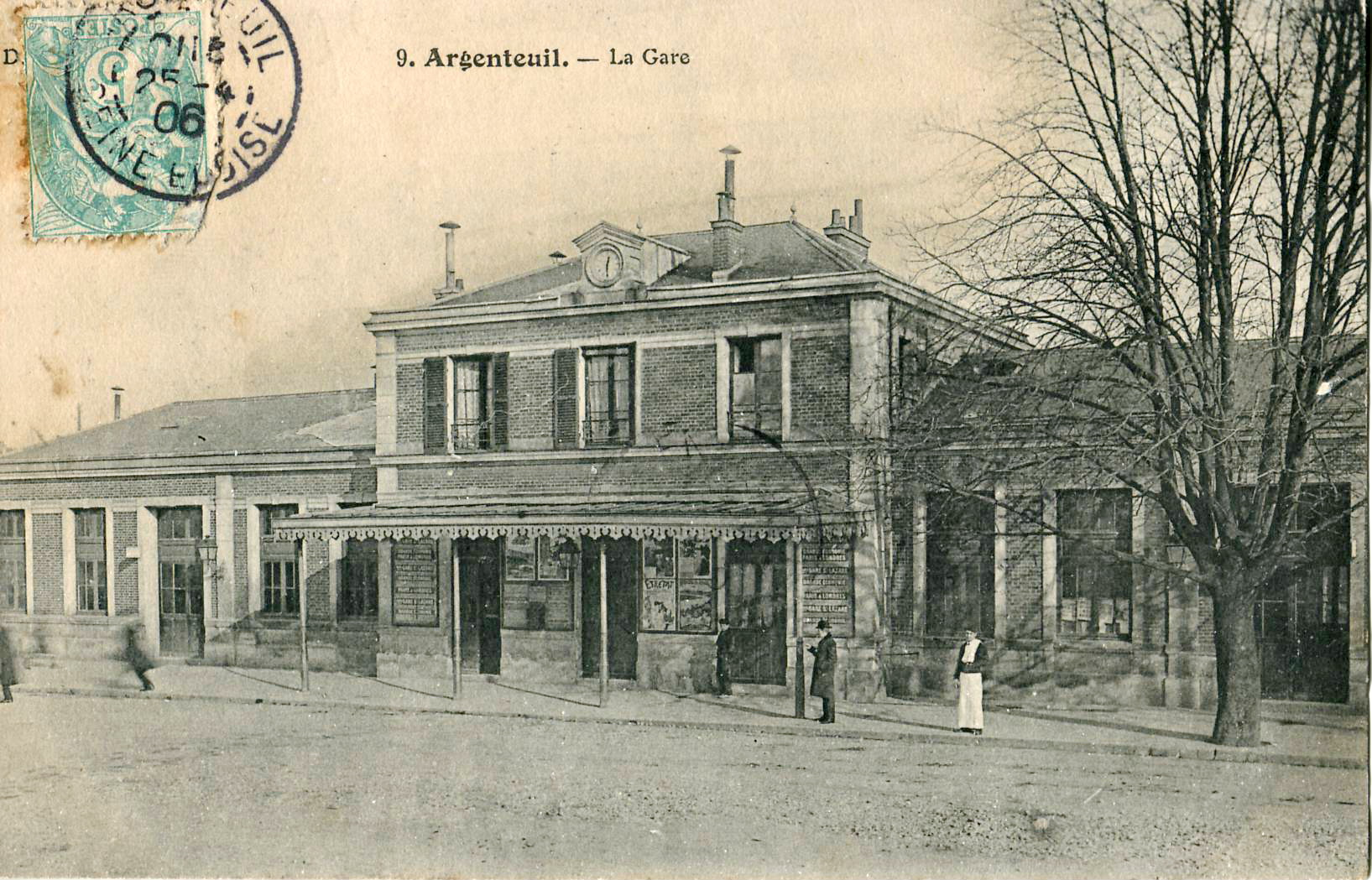
The station in the 20th century.

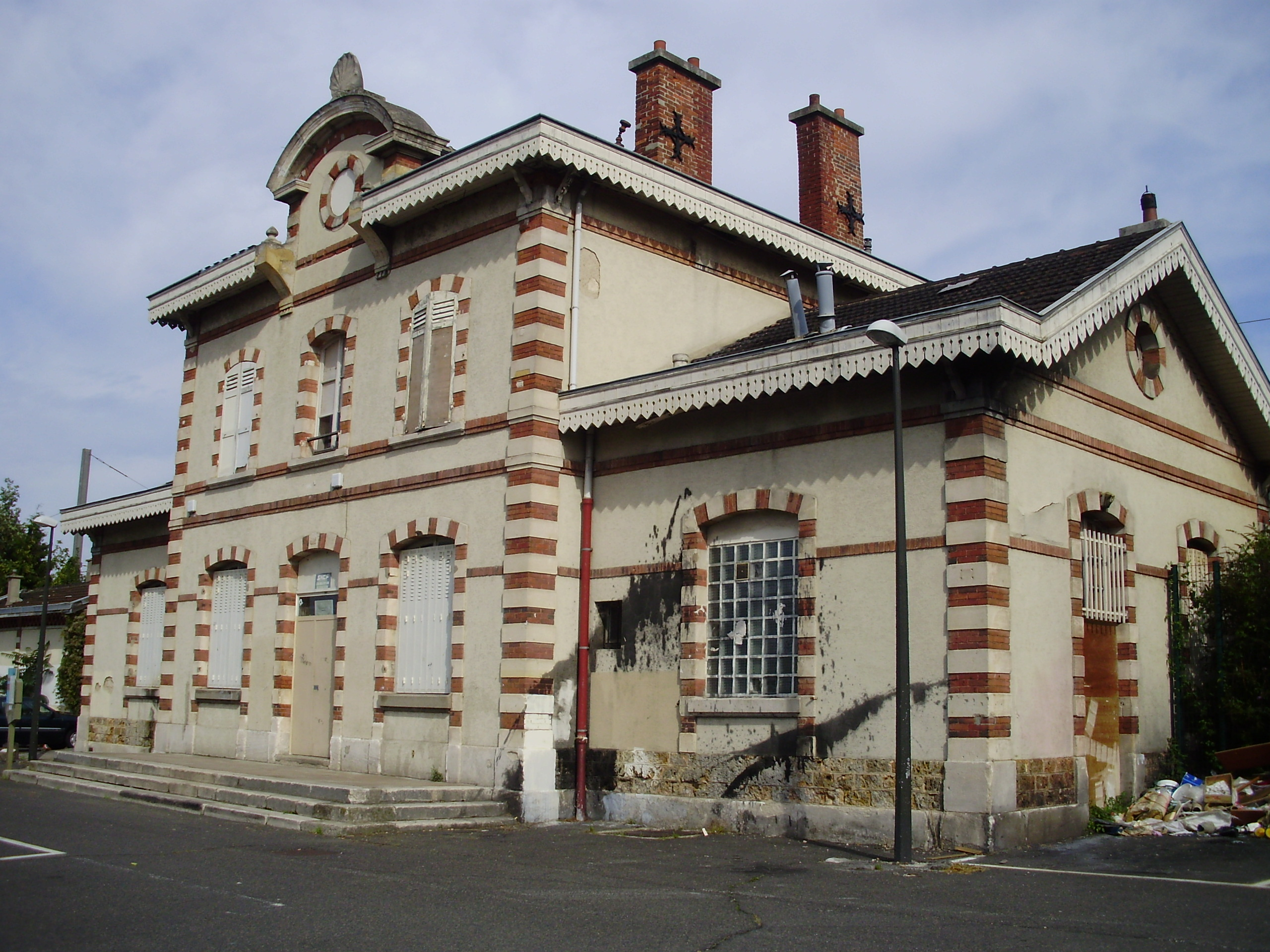
The passenger building at the entrance of the station.

A short five-kilometer line between Argenteuil and Ermont-Eaubonne was built by the Compagnie des chemins de fer du Nord under an agreement signed on June 21, 1857, between the Minister of Public Works and the company—an agreement approved by an imperial decree on June 26, 1857. To create a line between the two networks, this section was built jointly by the two companies. The line entered on service in 1863, at which time the Ouest station was relocated to the opposite bank of the Seine, to its current site.

Trains then served Pontoise by taking this new line, followed by the Cernay connection (between the Sannois and Cernay stations) and finally the Saint-Denis–Pontoise line, which also belonged to the Compagnie du Nord. Other trains known as "circular" services connected Paris-Saint-Lazare to Paris-Nord via Ermont-Eaubonne.

During the Siege of Paris (1870–1871), the building was burned by the Germans.

In 1892, the line between Argenteuil and Mantes via Conflans opened to traffic. Trains serving Pontoise used this new route, which belonged entirely to the Compagnie de l'Ouest.

During the 1920s, track crossings at Ermont made increasingly difficult by steadily rising traffic led to the suspension of the circular service; the Argenteuil–Ermont-Eaubonne section became a simple, isolated shuttle. This section was one of the last suburban lines to be electrified, in May 1983. From September 25, 1988, to July 9, 2006, the section was served by the RER C to Argenteuil. These services discontinued from August 27, 2006, after the section were transferred to Transilien Line J.

== Passengers ==
From 2015 to 2024, according to SNCF estimates, the annual passenger traffic at the station amounted to the figures indicated in the table below:

| Year | 2015 | 2016 | 2017 | 2018 | 2019 | 2020 | 2021 | 2022 | 2023 | 2024 |
|---|---|---|---|---|---|---|---|---|---|---|
| Passengers | 14,929,217 | 15,388,969 | 15,608,674 | 16,094,786 | 16,219,640 | 8,869,575 | 14,527,144 | 16,033,835 | 15,911,703 | 17,548,229 |

== Connections ==
=== Train service ===
The station is served by trains of the Transilien Line J towards Paris-Saint-Lazare or Mantes-la-Jolie, Pontoise or Gisors.

=== Bus connections ===
The station is connected with many bus lines:

- Boucles - Nord de Seine: 140, 340
- Défense - Saint-Cloud: 272
- Plaine - Saint-Denis: 361
- Vallée de Montmorency: 1516
- Argenteuil - Boucles de Seine: 6401 6402 6403 6411 6414 6416 6418 6422
- Express Roissy: 9517
- Noctilien: N52

== Gallery ==
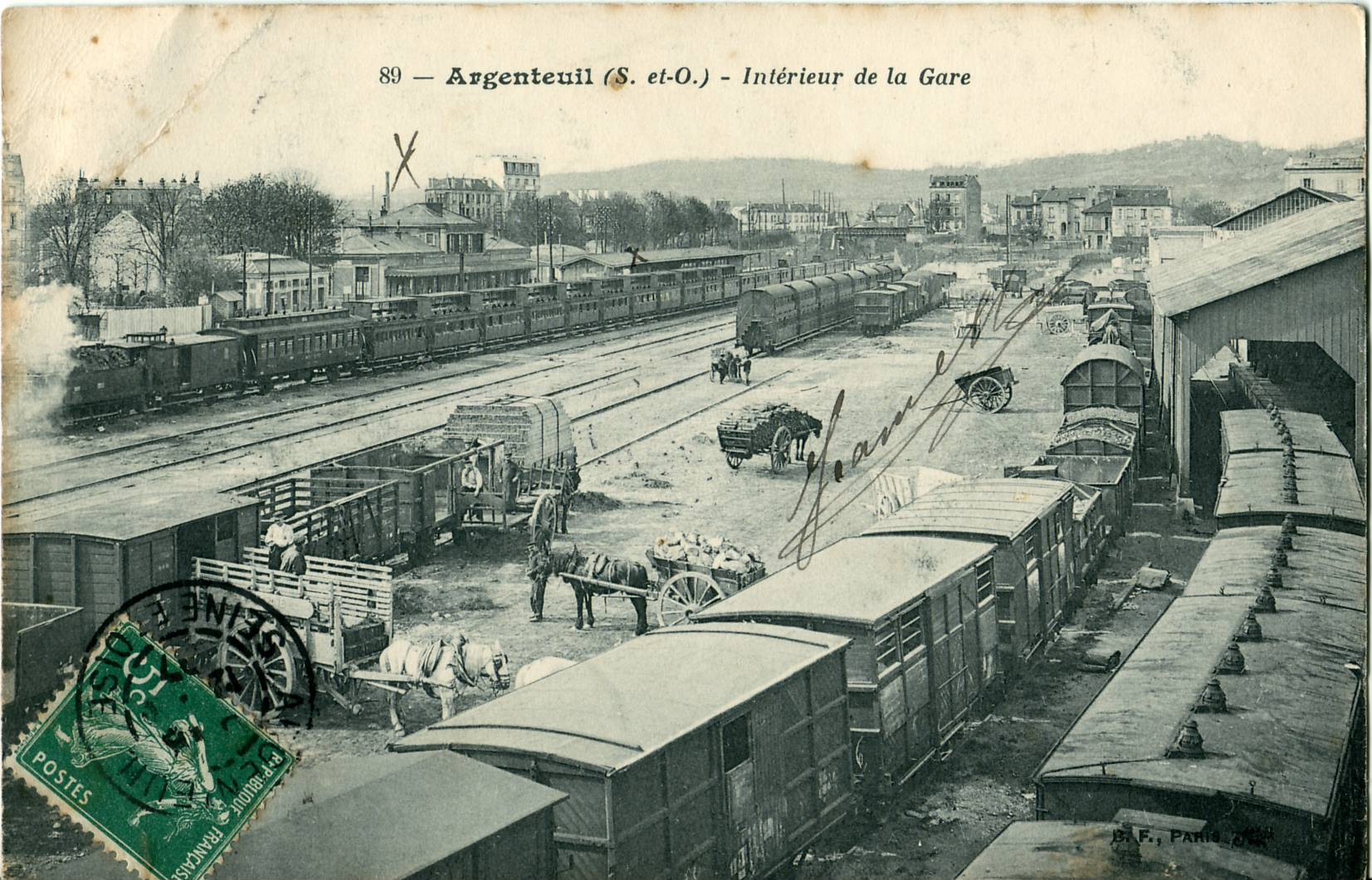
The station in 1907.

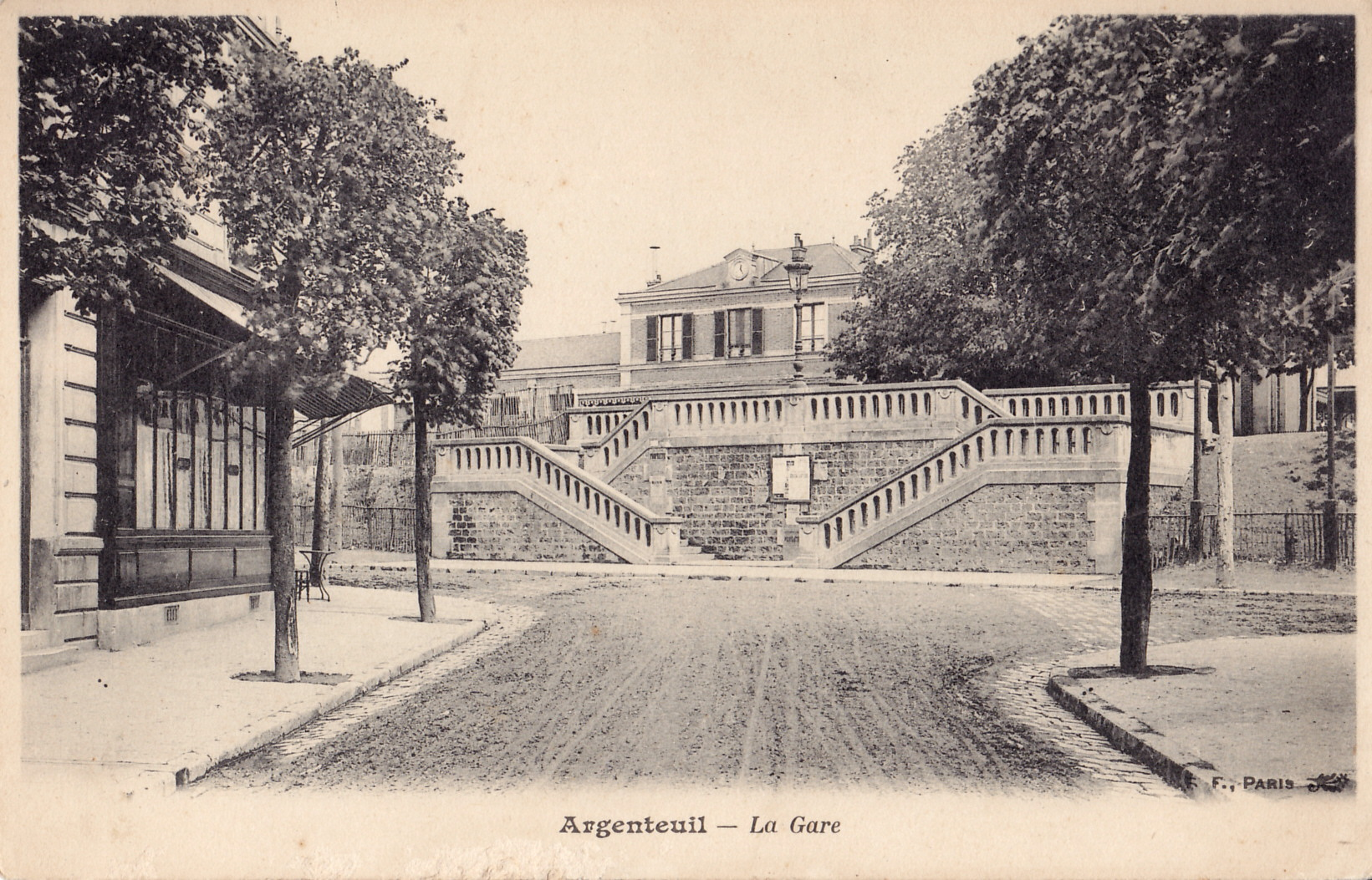
The station in the 1900s.

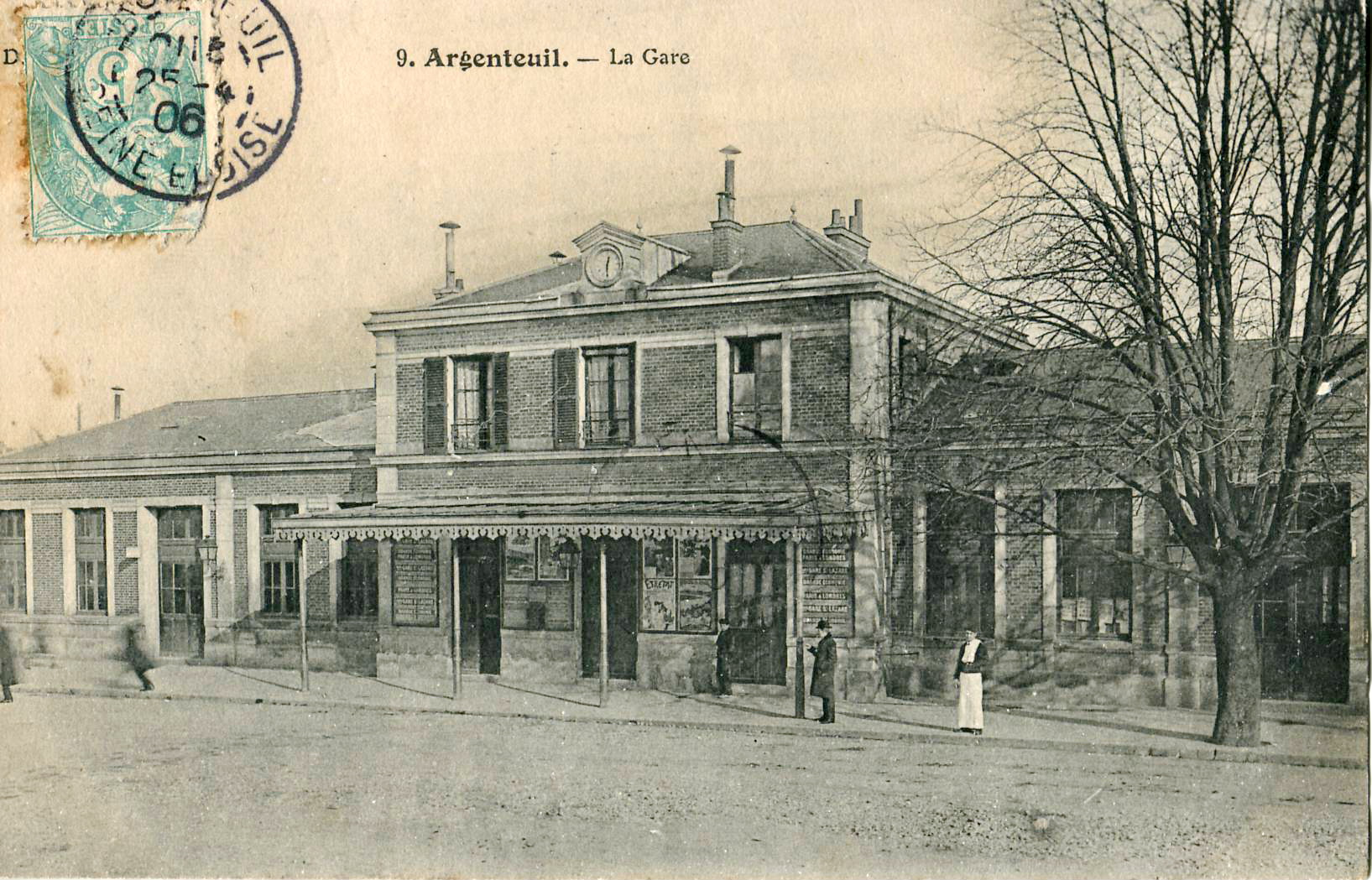
The station in the 20th century.

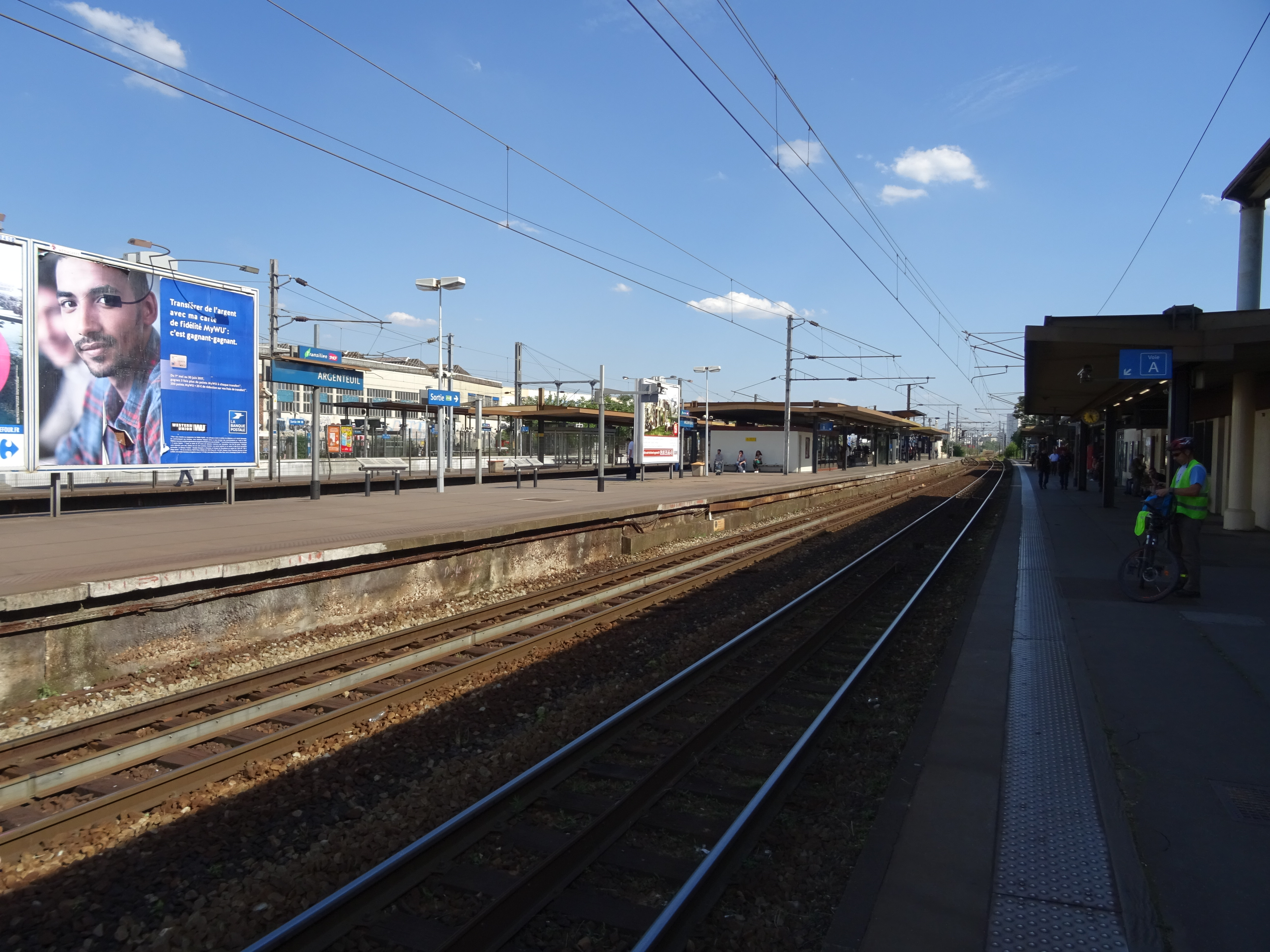
The tracks of the station towards Pontoise or Mantes-la-Jolie.

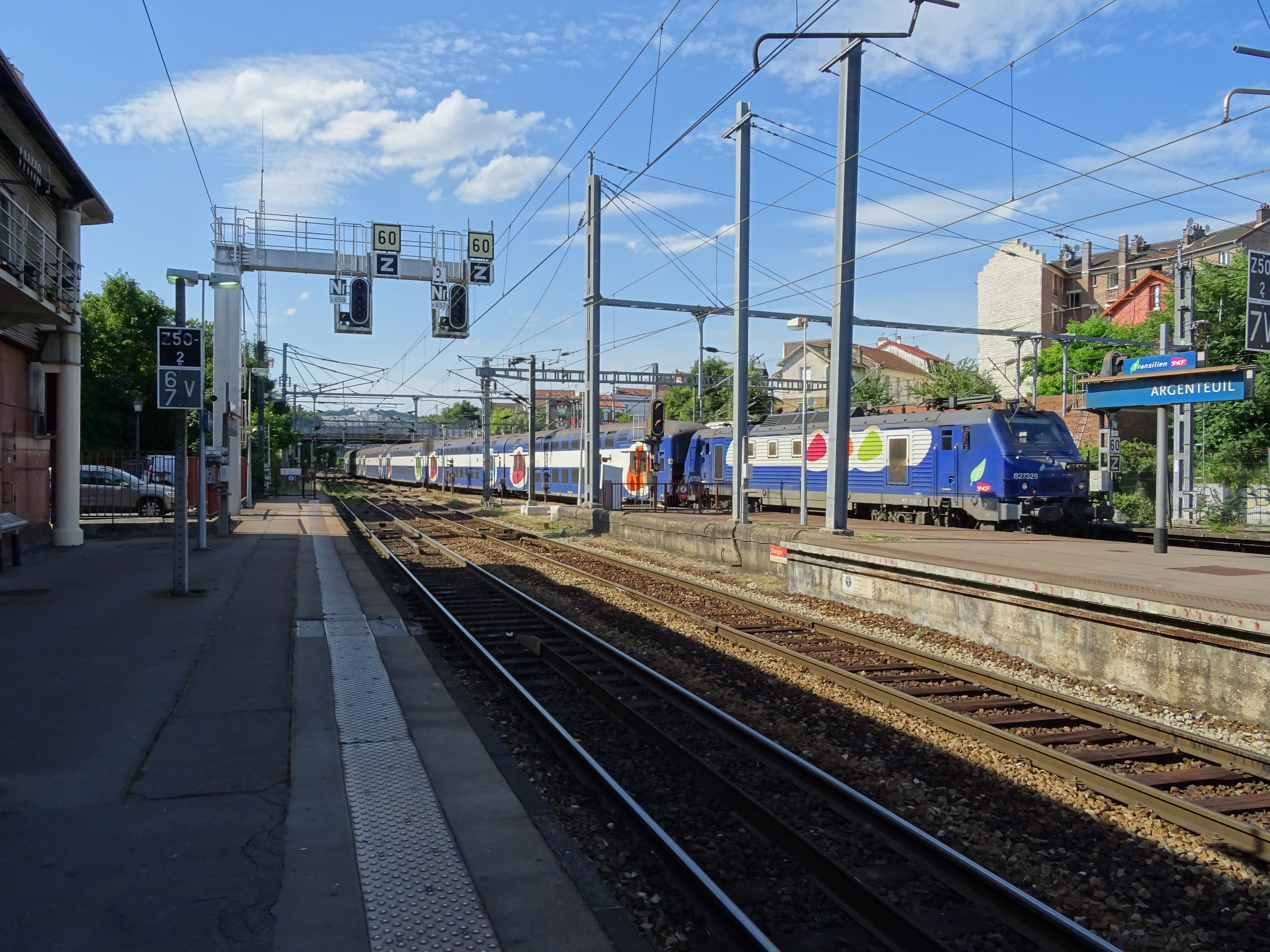
A BB 27300 tracting VB 2N in the entrance of the station.

== See also ==
- List of stations of the Paris RER
- List of stations of the Paris Métro

== Bibliography ==
- (in French) Paris et l'Île de France – Tome 1: Les réseaux Est, Nord et Saint-Lazare, 2002, Le Train. ISSN 1267-5008
