= Val d'Argenteuil station =

French railway station

Val d'Argenteuil
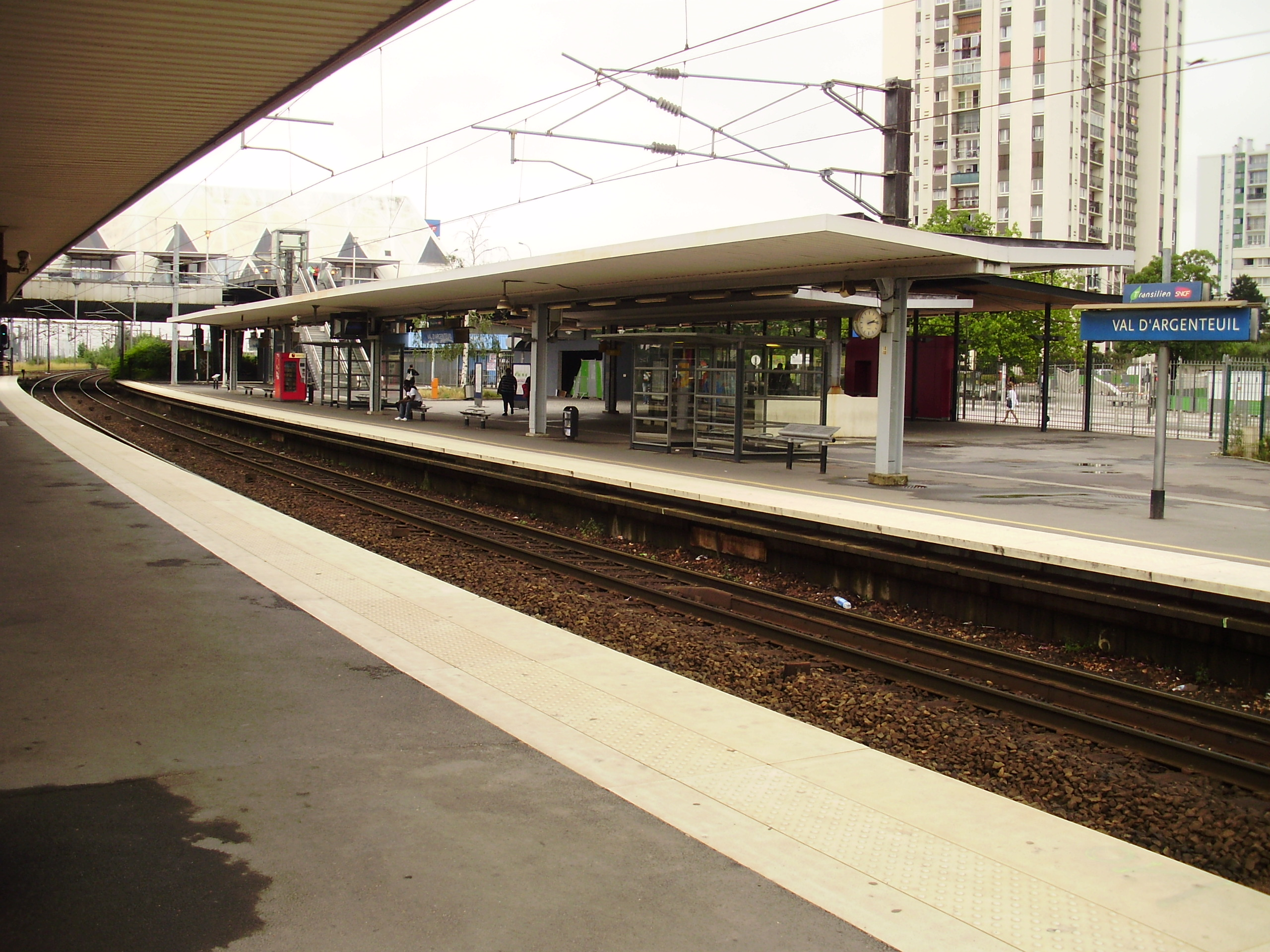

General information
- Location: Argenteuil, Val-d'Oise, Île-de-France, France
- Coordinates: 48°57′01″N 2°13′53″E

Other information
- Station code: 87381798

Passengers
- 2024: 7,015,546

Services
Preceding station	Transilien	Following station
Argenteuil towards Paris-St.-Lazare	Line J	Cormeilles-en-Parisis towards Gisors or Mantes-la-Jolie
Location

Val d'Argenteuil is a railway station in Argenteuil, in the department of Val-d'Oise, France. It is served by Transilien Line J commuter trains.

== See also ==
- List of stations of the Paris RER
