= Rueil-Malmaison station =

Railway station in France

Rueil-Malmaison
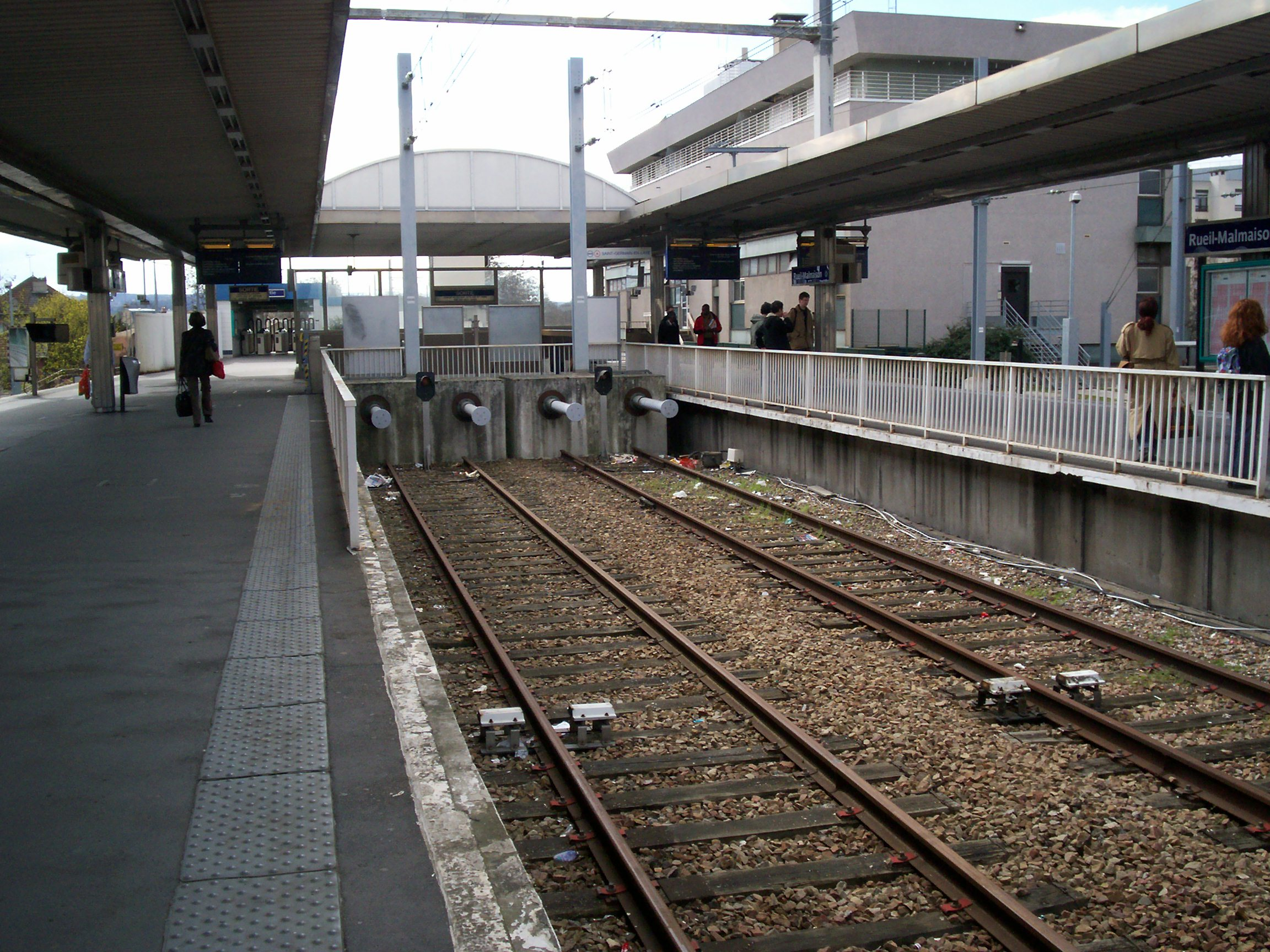

General information
- Owner: RATP
- Platforms: 2 island platforms
- Tracks: 4

Construction
- Accessible: Yes, by request to staff

Other information
- Station code: 87758052
- Fare zone: 3

History
- Opened: 1 October 1972; 54 years ago

Services
Preceding station	RER	Following station
Chatou–Croissy towards Saint-Germain-en-Laye	RER A	Nanterre-Ville towards Boissy-Saint-Léger
Location

Rueil-Malmaison (French pronunciation: [ʁɥɛj malmɛzɔ̃]) is a French railway station on the Paris-Saint-Lazare to Saint-Germain-en-Laye line, located in the municipality of Rueil-Malmaison, in the Hauts-de-Seine department in the Île-de-France region.

It is operated by the Régie Autonome des Transports Parisiens (RATP) and served by trains on line A of the RER network.

== The station ==
The station, located at the 13.680-kilometer mark of the Paris-Saint-Lazare to Saint-Germain-en-Laye line, is served by RER A trains operating on branch A1 to Saint-Germain-en-Laye.

In 2021, according to RATP estimates, 4,247,217 passengers entered this station.

== Service ==
The station is served by six trains per hour during off-peak hours, 12 to 18 trains per hour during morning and evening rush hours, and four trains per hour in the evening.

It acts as a terminus for trains with mission codes beginning with Y.

The service pattern is as follows:

- During off-peak hours:
  - 6 trains per hour (1 train every 10 minutes) to Saint-Germain-en-Laye and Marne-la-Vallée - Chessy, from Monday to Friday.
  - 4 trains per hour (1 train every 15 minutes) to Saint-Germain-en-Laye and Marne-la-Vallée - Chessy, from Monday to Friday, in the evening.
- During peak hours:
  - 12 trains per hour (1 train every 5 minutes) to Marne-la-Vallée - Chessy or Torcy, from Monday to Friday.
  - 9-10 trains per hour (1 train every 6-7 minutes) to Saint-Germain-en-Laye or Le Vésinet - Le Pecq, from Monday to Friday.
  - 2-3 trains per hour (1 train every 20-30 minutes) terminating at Rueil-Malmaison.
- On weekends:
  - 6 trains per hour (1 train every 10 minutes) to Saint-Germain-en-Laye and Boissy-Saint-Léger, during the day.
  - 4 trains per hour (1 train every 15 minutes) to Saint-Germain-en-Laye and Boissy-Saint-Léger, in the evening.

== Connections ==
The station is served by the following bus lines:

- RATP network: Lines 144, 158, 241, 244, 367, and 467.
- Argenteuil - Boucles de Seine network: Lines B and 1.
- Grand Versailles network: Line 6227.
- Noctilien night bus network: Line N153.
