= Nanterre-Ville station =

Railway station in Nanterre, France

Nanterre-Ville
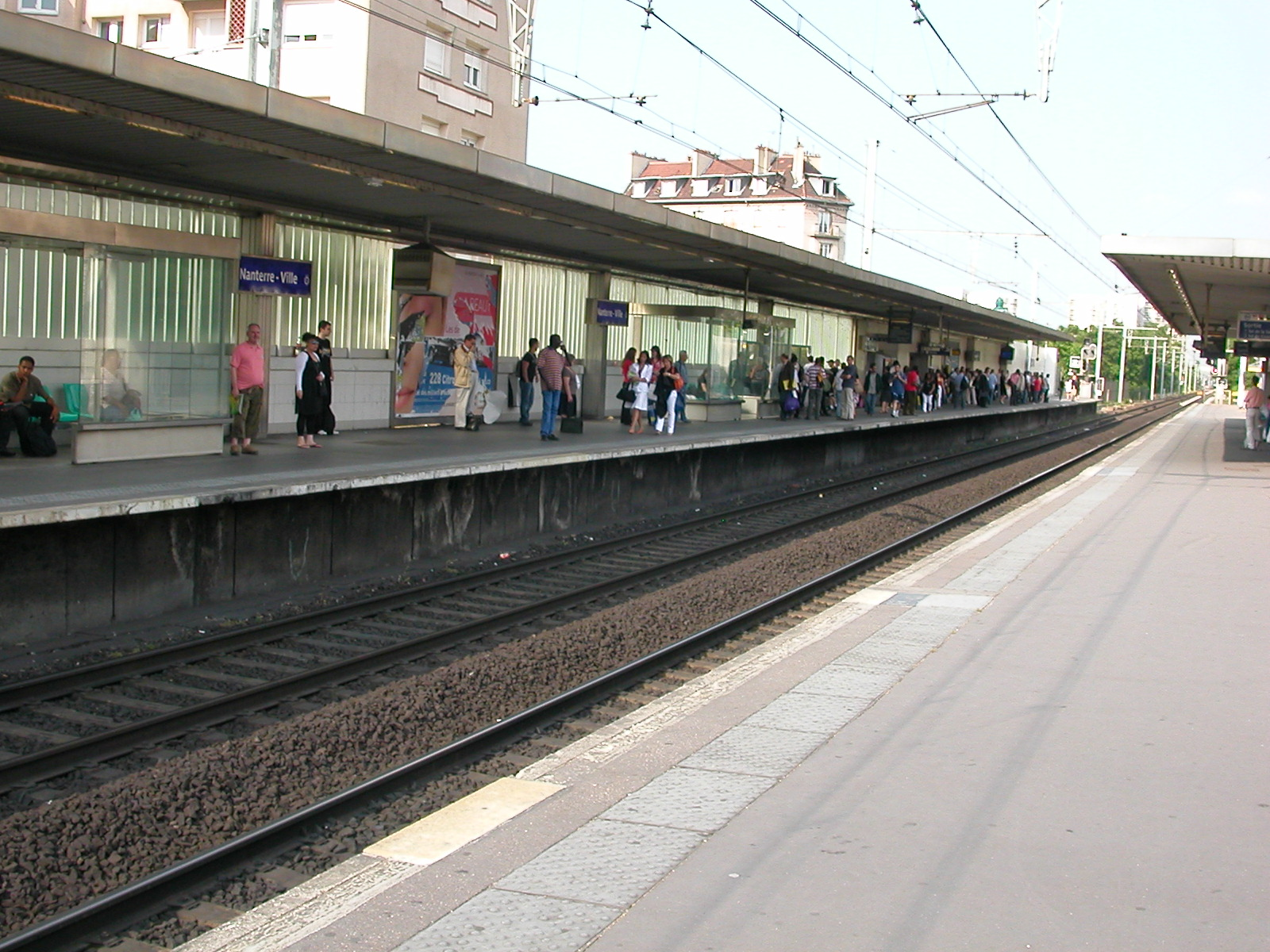
- Nanterre–Ville station platform

General information
- Location: Nanterre; France
- Coordinates: 48°53′43″N 2°11′44″E
- Operator: RATP Group
- Platforms: 2 side platforms
- Tracks: 2

Construction
- Structure type: Embankment
- Accessible: Yes, by request to staff

Other information
- Station code: 87758045
- Fare zone: 3

History
- Opened: 1 October 1972

Services
Preceding station	RER	Following station
Rueil-Malmaison towards Saint-Germain-en-Laye	RER A	Nanterre-Université towards Boissy-Saint-Léger
Location

Nanterre-Ville station (French pronunciation: [nɑ̃tɛʁ vil]) is a railway station in Nanterre on the A1 branch on Line A of the Réseau Express Régional system. Trains come every 10 minutes and the area is about 12 minutes ride from La Defense business district and about 18 minutes from the Arc de Triomphe.
