= Chatou–Croissy station =

Railway station in Chatou, France

Chatou–Croissy
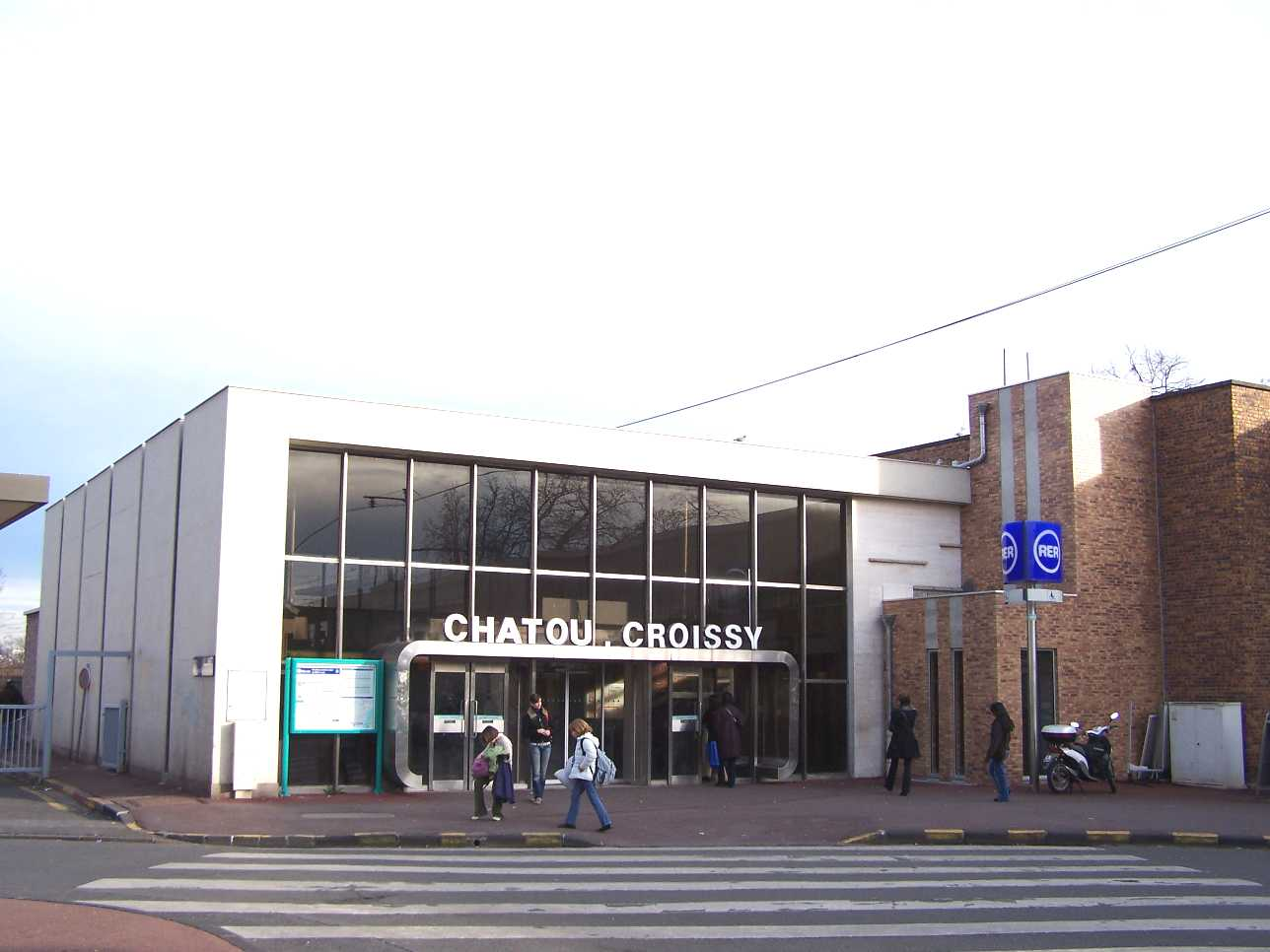
- Chatou – Croissy station

General information
- Coordinates: 48°53′7″N 2°9′22″E
- Owner: RATP
- Platforms: 2 side platforms
- Tracks: 2

Construction
- Accessible: Yes, by request to staff

Other information
- Station code: 87758060
- Fare zone: 4

History
- Opened: 1 October 1972; 53 years ago

Services
Preceding station	RER	Following station
Le Vésinet–Centre towards Saint-Germain-en-Laye	RER A	Rueil-Malmaison towards Boissy-Saint-Léger
Location

Chatou–Croissy is a railway station in Chatou, France, on the A1 branch of the Paris Region RER commuter rail line A.
