= Le Vésinet–Le Pecq station =

Railway station in Le Vésinet, France

Coordinates: 48.898°N 2.122°E

Le Vésinet–Le Pecq
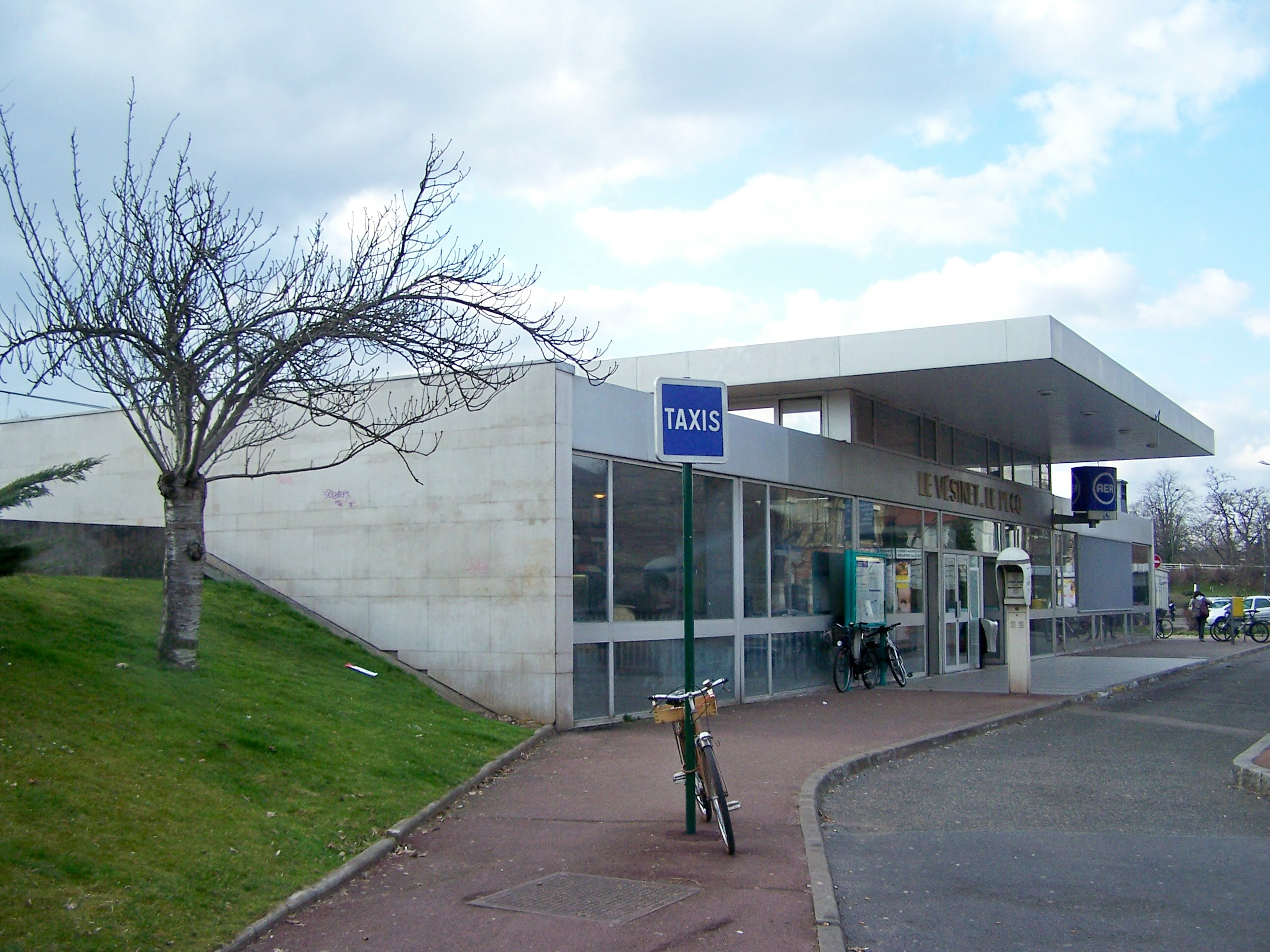

General information
- Owner: RATP
- Platforms: 2 island platforms
- Tracks: 3

Construction
- Accessible: Yes, by request to staff

Other information
- Station code: 87758086
- Fare zone: 4

History
- Opened: 1972; 54 years ago

Services
Preceding station	RER	Following station
Saint-Germain-en-Laye Terminus	RER A	Le Vésinet–Centre towards Boissy-Saint-Léger
Location

Le Vésinet–Le Pecq is a railway station in Le Vésinet, France, built in 1972, on the A1 branch of the Paris Region RER commuter rail line A. It primarily serves the communities of Le Vésinet, Le Pecq, and southern Montesson in the western suburbs of Paris.

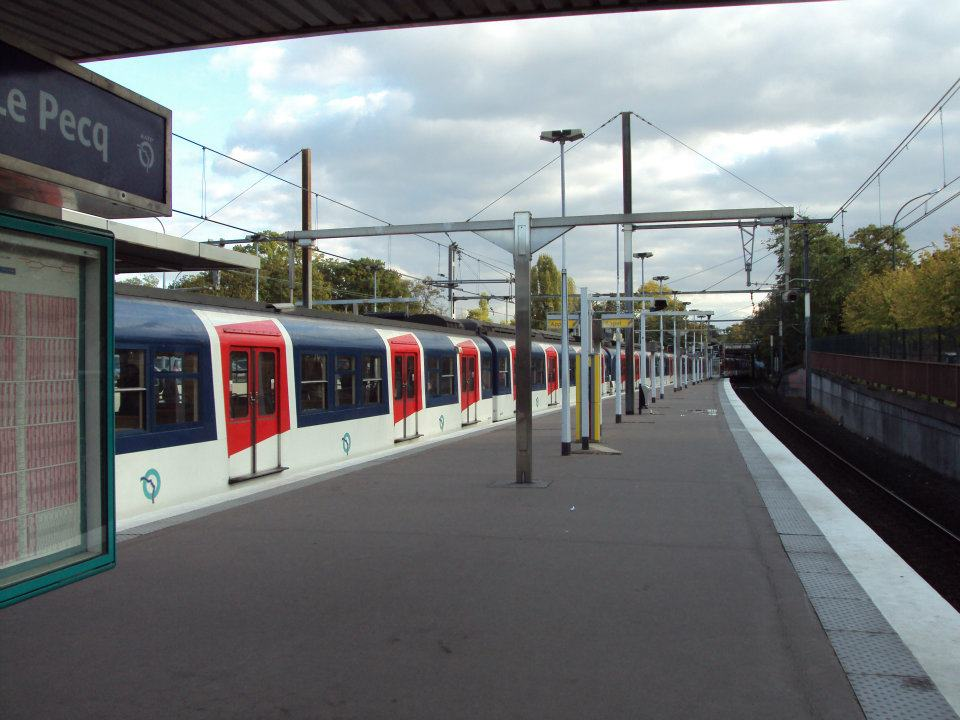
View from station platform eastward toward Paris.

== History ==
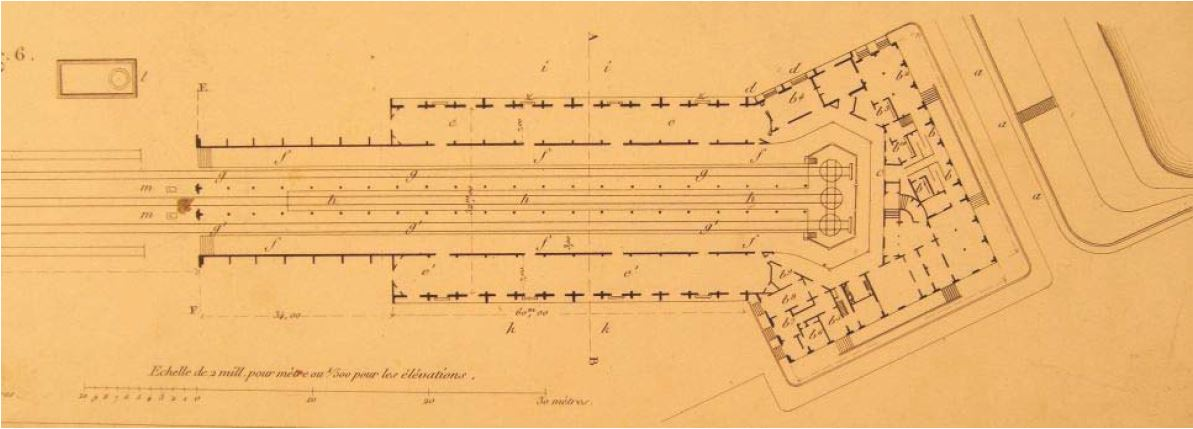
Plan of the first station

The station was first established as the western terminus of the Paris–Saint-Germain-en-Laye railway in 1837. The desired terminus at Saint-Germain-en-Laye was on a bluff at the far side of the Seine, at the end of a gradient that the steam locomotives of the time could not climb. Instead, an atmospheric railway was built across the Seine to Saint-Germain, which could accommodate the grade. The atmospheric railway operated beginning in 1847. In 1860, when more powerful steam locomotives were introduced that could reach Saint-Germain, the atmospheric line was removed. A new station was built in 1861, and the old station was abandoned. The buried site was exhumed during archaeological excavations in 2017. The time from Le Pecq to Paris dropped from a four-hour boat trip to 25-30 minutes by train. An 1858 accident attributed to faulty brakes on the atmospheric line killed three people, hastening the conversion to steam power.

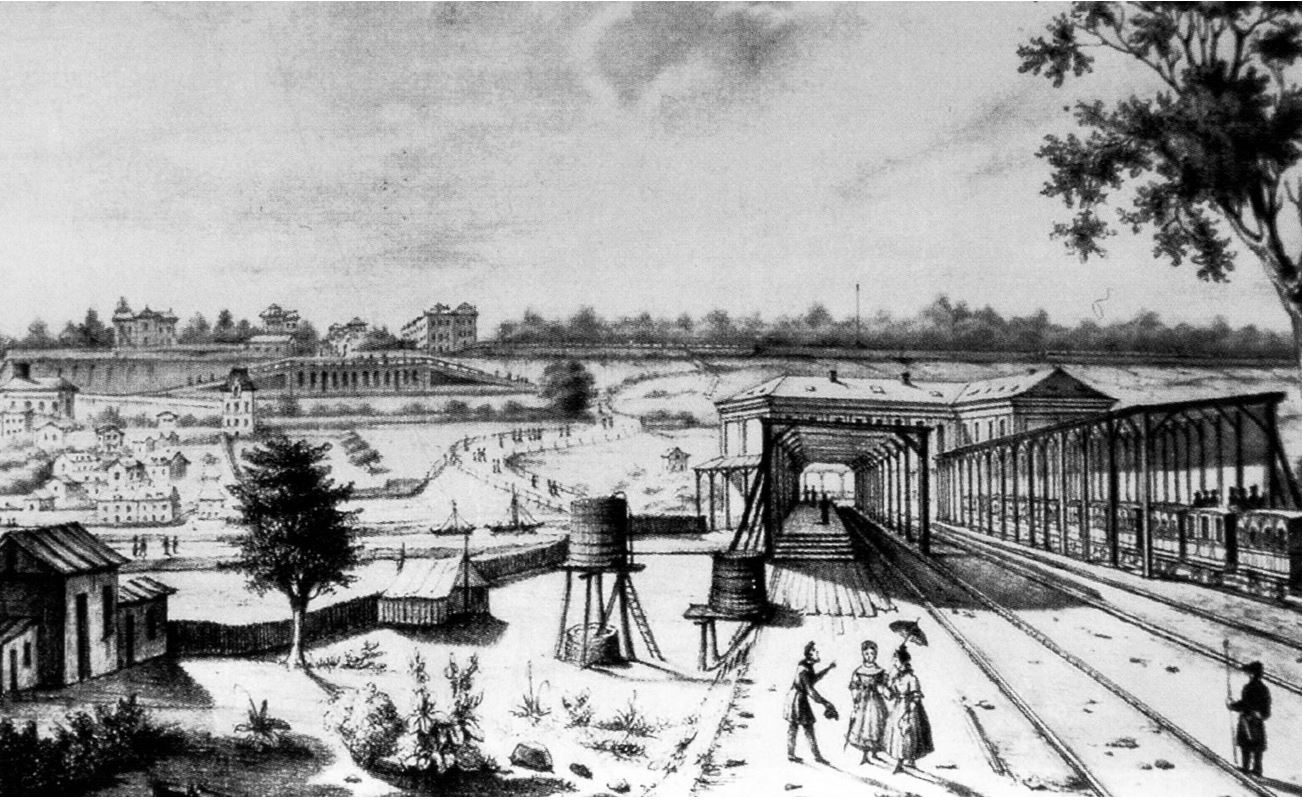
The first Le Pecq station in 1837

The second station was built farther back from the river in Le Vésinet rather than Le Pecq in 1861, but retained its name. This was replaced in 1955 with a much more utilitarian structure on Rue Watteau. The old station was retained as a baggage facility by the SNCF and RATP. When the line came under the control of the RATP in 1972, the present station was constructed for RER Line A, somewhat to the south of the 1955 station, which remains as a community center. The new station adopted the name Le Vésinet–Le Pecq. The second station survived until 2019, when structural failure led the town to demolish it.

== Services and Station ==
The frequency of services is a train every 10 minutes during peak hours, 12 trains per hour at peak times, and a train every 15 minutes in the evenings. It also acts as a terminus for some trains at peak hours.

This station contains 2 platforms with 3 tracks, for which the third (center track) is used solely for westbound trains making their terminus here instead of Saint-Germain-en-Laye. The two outer tracks are used for standard routing trains.

Trains departing eastward from this station take about 25 minutes (with stops) to reach the central Châtelet – Les Halles station in Paris. Westbound trains take about 6 minutes to reach the terminus station St. Germain-en-Laye.

== Connections ==
=== Bus ===
The station is served by lines 3A, 3AC, 3C, 7, 7SC, 7SG, 19, 20, 21, 21M, and 22 of the RATP/SNCF bus network, and afterhours via line N153 of the Noctilien (night-time) bus network.
