= List of tram stops in Île-de-France =

The following is a list of all stops of the Île-de-France tramways, sorted by lines.

== Stations ==
Table outlining tram stops in Île-de-France
Station	Line	Opened	Zone	Arrondissement or commune	Connections	Lat/Long	Photograph
Asnières-Quatre Routes	Île-de-France tramway Line 1	12 October 2019	3	Asnières-sur-Seine, Bois-Colombes, Colombes		48°55′37″N 2°16′24″E	Asnières-Quatre Routes
Les Courtilles	Île-de-France tramway Line 1	15 November 2012	3	Asnières-sur-Seine, Gennevilliers	Paris Metro Paris Metro Line 13	48°55′49″N 2°17′03″E	Les Courtilles
Le Luth	Île-de-France tramway Line 1	15 November 2012	3	Gennevilliers		48°55′53″N 2°17′17″E	Le Luth
Le Village	Île-de-France tramway Line 1	15 November 2012	3	Gennevilliers		48°56′00″N 2°17′40″E	Le Village
Timbaud	Île-de-France tramway Line 1	15 November 2012	3	Gennevilliers		48°56′00″N 2°18′02″E; 48°55′58″N 2°18′05″E	Timbaud
Gennevilliers	Île-de-France tramway Line 1	15 November 2012	3	Gennevilliers	RER RER C	48°56′00″N 2°18′28″E	Gennevilliers
Parc des Chanteraines	Île-de-France tramway Line 1	15 November 2012	3	Gennevilliers		48°56′02″N 2°18′49″E	Parc des Chanteraines
Chemin des Reniers	Île-de-France tramway Line 1	15 November 2012	3	Villeneuve-la-Garenne		48°56′04″N 2°19′17″E	Chemin des Reniers
La Noue	Île-de-France tramway Line 1	15 November 2012	3	Villeneuve-la-Garenne		48°56′06″N 2°19′40″E	La Noue
Mairie de Villeneuve-la-Garenne	Île-de-France tramway Line 1	15 November 2012	3	Villeneuve-la-Garenne		48°56′08″N 2°20′00″E	Mairie de Villeneuve-la-Garenne
L'Île-Saint-Denis	Île-de-France tramway Line 1	15 November 2012	3	L'Île-Saint-Denis		48°56′09″N 2°20′21″E	L'Île-Saint-Denis
Saint-Denis–Gare	Île-de-France tramway Line 1	21 December 1992	3	Saint-Denis	RER RER D Transilien Transilien Line H (Paris-Nord) Tramways in Île-de-France Île-de-France tramway Line 8	48°56′10″N 2°20′47″E	Saint-Denis–Gare
Théâtre Gérard Philipe	Île-de-France tramway Line 1	21 December 1992	3	Saint-Denis		48°56′15″N 2°21′01″E	Théâtre Gérard Philipe
Marché de Saint-Denis	Île-de-France tramway Line 1	21 December 1992	3	Saint-Denis	Tramways in Île-de-France Île-de-France tramway Line 5	48°56′19″N 2°21′21″E	Marché de Saint-Denis
Basilique de Saint-Denis	Île-de-France tramway Line 1	21 December 1992	3	Saint-Denis	Paris Metro Paris Metro Line 13	48°56′17″N 2°21′39″E	Basilique de Saint-Denis
Cimetière de Saint-Denis	Île-de-France tramway Line 1	21 December 1992	3	Saint-Denis		48°56′11″N 2°21′50″E	Cimetière de Saint-Denis
Hôpital Delafontaine	Île-de-France tramway Line 1	21 December 1992	3	Saint-Denis		48°56′01″N 2°22′16″E	Hôpital Delafontaine
Cosmonautes	Île-de-France tramway Line 1	21 December 1992	3	Saint-Denis, La Courneuve		48°55′54″N 2°22′41″E	Cosmonautes
La Courneuve - Six Routes	Île-de-France tramway Line 1	21 December 1992	3	La Courneuve		48°55′48″N 2°23′05″E	La Courneuve - Six Routes
Hôtel de Ville de La Courneuve	Île-de-France tramway Line 1	21 December 1992	3	La Courneuve		48°55′39″N 2°23′32″E	Hôtel de Ville de La Courneuve
Stade Géo André	Île-de-France tramway Line 1	21 December 1992	3	La Courneuve		48°55′28″N 2°24′07″E	Stade Géo André
Danton	Île-de-France tramway Line 1	21 December 1992	3	La Courneuve		48°55′22″N 2°24′24″E	Danton
La Courneuve–8 mai 1945	Île-de-France tramway Line 1	6 July 1992	3	La Courneuve	Paris Metro Paris Metro Line 7	48°55′15″N 2°24′38″E	La Courneuve–8 mai 1945
Maurice Lachâtre	Île-de-France tramway Line 1	6 July 1992	3	Drancy, Bobigny		48°55′09″N 2°24′50″E	Maurice Lachâtre
Drancy-Avenir	Île-de-France tramway Line 1	6 July 1992	3	Drancy, Bobigny		48°55′04″N 2°25′04″E	Drancy-Avenir
Hôpital Avicenne	Île-de-France tramway Line 1	6 July 1992	3	Drancy, Bobigny		48°54′57″N 2°25′32″E	Hôpital Avicenne
Gaston Roulaud	Île-de-France tramway Line 1	6 July 1992	3	Drancy, Bobigny		48°54′51″N 2°25′53″E	Gaston Roulaud
Escadrille Normandie-Niémen	Île-de-France tramway Line 1	6 July 1992	3	Drancy, Bobigny		48°54′46″N 2°26′08″E	Escadrille Normandie-Niémen
La Ferme	Île-de-France tramway Line 1	6 July 1992	3	Bobigny		48°54′35″N 2°26′15″E	La Ferme
Libération	Île-de-France tramway Line 1	6 July 1992	3	Bobigny		48°54′25″N 2°26′19″E	Libération
Hôtel de Ville de Bobigny	Île-de-France tramway Line 1	6 July 1992	3	Bobigny		48°54′24″N 2°26′38″E	Hôtel de Ville de Bobigny
Bobigny - Pablo Picasso	Île-de-France tramway Line 1	6 July 1992	3	Bobigny	Paris Metro Paris Metro Line 5	48°54′24″N 2°27′00″E	Bobigny - Pablo Picasso
Jean Rostand	Île-de-France tramway Line 1	15 December 2003	3	Bobigny		48°54′28″N 2°27′16″E	Jean Rostand
Auguste Delaune	Île-de-France tramway Line 1	15 December 2003	3	Bobigny		48°54′24″N 2°27′38″E	Auguste Delaune
Pont de Bondy	Île-de-France tramway Line 1	15 December 2003	3	Bobigny, Noisy-le-Sec		48°54′18″N 2°28′11″E	Pont de Bondy
Petit Noisy	Île-de-France tramway Line 1	15 December 2003	3	Noisy-le-Sec		48°54′02″N 2°27′55″E	Petit Noisy
Noisy-le-Sec	Île-de-France tramway Line 1	15 December 2003	3	Noisy-le-Sec	RER RER E	48°53′45″N 2°27′37″E	Noisy-le-Sec
Pont de Bezons	Île-de-France tramway Line 2	19 November 2012	4	Bezons		48°55′24″N 2°13′03″E	Pont de Bezons
Parc Pierre Lagravère	Île-de-France tramway Line 2	19 November 2012	3	Colombes		48°55′04″N 2°13′28″E	Parc Pierre Lagravère
Victor Basch	Île-de-France tramway Line 2	19 November 2012	3	Colombes		48°54′51″N 2°13′46″E	Victor Basch
Jacqueline Auriol	Île-de-France tramway Line 2	19 November 2012	3	Colombes		48°54′38″N 2°14′03″E	Jacqueline Auriol
Charlebourg	Île-de-France tramway Line 2	19 November 2012	3	La Garenne-Colombes	(La Garenne-Colombes) (at a distance)	48°54′29″N 2°14′16″E	Charlebourg
Les Fauvelles	Île-de-France tramway Line 2	19 November 2012	3	La Garenne-Colombes		48°54′09″N 2°14′22″E	Les Fauvelles
Faubourg de l'Arche	Île-de-France tramway Line 2	19 November 2012	3	Courbevoie		48°53′48″N 2°14′24″E	Faubourg de l'Arche
La Défense	Île-de-France tramway Line 2	2 July 1997	3	Puteaux	RER RER A Transilien Transilien Line L (Paris-Saint-Lazare) Transilien Line U Paris Metro Paris Metro Line 1	48°53′34″N 2°14′14″E	La Défense
Puteaux	Île-de-France tramway Line 2	2 July 1997	3	Puteaux	Transilien Transilien Line L (Paris-Saint-Lazare) Transilien Line U	48°53′00″N 2°14′02″E	Puteaux
Belvédère	Île-de-France tramway Line 2	2 July 1997	3	Suresnes		48°52′33″N 2°13′33″E	Belvédère
Suresnes-Longchamp	Île-de-France tramway Line 2	2 July 1997	3	Suresnes	(Suresnes–Mont-Valérien) (at a distance)	48°52′05″N 2°13′17″E	Suresnes-Longchamp
Les Coteaux	Île-de-France tramway Line 2	2 July 1997	3	Saint-Cloud	(Le Val d'Or) (at a distance)	48°51′25″N 2°13′14″E	Les Coteaux
Les Milons	Île-de-France tramway Line 2	2 July 1997	3	Saint-Cloud		48°50′59″N 2°13′16″E	Les Milons
Parc de Saint-Cloud	Île-de-France tramway Line 2	2 July 1997	3	Saint-Cloud	(Boulogne - Pont de Saint-Cloud) (at a distance)	48°50′35″N 2°13′19″E	Parc de Saint-Cloud
Musée de Sèvres	Île-de-France tramway Line 2	2 July 1997	3	Saint-Cloud, Sèvres	(Pont de Sèvres) (at a distance)	48°49′42″N 2°13′32″E	Musée de Sèvres
Brimborion	Île-de-France tramway Line 2	2 July 1997	3	Sèvres, Meudon		48°49′20″N 2°13′53″E	Brimborion
Meudon-sur-Seine	Île-de-France tramway Line 2	2 July 1997	3	Meudon		48°49′09″N 2°14′22″E	Meudon-sur-Seine
Les Moulineaux	Île-de-France tramway Line 2	2 July 1997	2	Issy-les-Moulineaux		48°49′17″N 2°15′05″E	Les Moulineaux
Jacques-Henri Lartigue	Île-de-France tramway Line 2	2 July 1997	2	Issy-les-Moulineaux		48°49′29″N 2°15′38″E	Jacques-Henri Lartigue
Issy–Val de Seine	Île-de-France tramway Line 2	2 July 1997	2	Issy-les-Moulineaux	RER RER C	48°49′47″N 2°15′47″E	Issy-Val de Seine
Henri Farman	Île-de-France tramway Line 2	21 November 2009	1	Paris 15th		48°50′05″N 2°16′14″E	Henri Farman
Suzanne Lenglen	Île-de-France tramway Line 2	21 November 2009	1	Paris 15th	(Balard) (at a distance)	48°49′59″N 2°16′38″E	Suzanne Lenglen
Porte d'Issy	Île-de-France tramway Line 2	21 November 2009	1	Paris 15th		48°49′55″N 2°16′52″E	Porte d'Issy
Porte de Versailles	Île-de-France tramway Line 2	21 November 2009	1	Paris 15th	Paris Metro Paris Metro Line 12 Tramways in Île-de-France Île-de-France tramway Line 3a	48°49′55″N 2°17′15″E	Porte de Versailles
Pont du Garigliano	Île-de-France tramway Line 3a	16 December 2006	1	Paris 15th	RER RER C	48°50′17″N 2°16′16″E	Pont du Garigliano
Balard	Île-de-France tramway Line 3a	16 December 2006	1	Paris 15th	(Suzanne Lenglen) (at a distance)	48°50′10″N 2°16′42″E	Balard
Desnouettes	Île-de-France tramway Line 3a	16 December 2006	1	Paris 15th		48°50′04″N 2°17′02″E	Desnouettes
Porte de Versailles	Île-de-France tramway Line 3a	16 December 2006	1	Paris 15th	Paris Metro Paris Metro Line 12 Tramways in Île-de-France Île-de-France tramway Line 2	48°49′58″N 2°17′17″E	Porte de Versailles
Georges Brassens	Île-de-France tramway Line 3a	16 December 2006	1	Paris 15th		48°49′47″N 2°17′44″E	Georges Brassens
Brancion	Île-de-France tramway Line 3a	16 December 2006	1	Paris 15th		48°49′43″N 2°18′03″E	Brancion
Porte de Vanves	Île-de-France tramway Line 3a	16 December 2006	1	Paris 14th	Paris Metro Paris Metro Line 13	48°49′39″N 2°18′24″E	Porte de Vanves
Didot	Île-de-France tramway Line 3a	16 December 2006	1	Paris 14th		48°49′33″N 2°18′48″E	Didot
Jean Moulin	Île-de-France tramway Line 3a	16 December 2006	1	Paris 14th		48°49′29″N 2°19′08″E	Jean Moulin
Porte d'Orléans	Île-de-France tramway Line 3a	16 December 2006	1	Paris 14th	Paris Metro Paris Metro Line 4	48°49′23″N 2°19′32″E	Porte d'Orléans
Montsouris	Île-de-France tramway Line 3a	16 December 2006	1	Paris 14th		48°49′17″N 2°20′00″E	Montsouris
Cité Universitaire	Île-de-France tramway Line 3a	16 December 2006	1	Paris 14th	RER RER B	48°49′13″N 2°20′19″E	Cité Universitaire
Stade Charléty	Île-de-France tramway Line 3a	16 December 2006	1	Paris 13th		48°49′10″N 2°20′45″E	Stade Charléty
Poterne des Peupliers	Île-de-France tramway Line 3a	16 December 2006	1	Paris 13th		48°49′15″N 2°21′03″E	Poterne des Peupliers
Porte d'Italie	Île-de-France tramway Line 3a	16 December 2006	1	Paris 13th	Paris Metro Paris Metro Line 7	48°49′09″N 2°21′37″E	Porte d'Italie
Porte de Choisy	Île-de-France tramway Line 3a	16 December 2006	1	Paris 13th	Paris Metro Paris Metro Line 7	48°49′11″N 2°21′50″E	Porte de Choisy
Porte d'Ivry	Île-de-France tramway Line 3a	16 December 2006	1	Paris 13th	Paris Metro Paris Metro Line 7	48°49′18″N 2°22′12″E	Porte d'Ivry
Maryse Bastié	Île-de-France tramway Line 3a	15 December 2012	1	Paris 13th		48°49′27″N 2°22′37″E	Maryse Bastié
Avenue de France	Île-de-France tramway Line 3a	15 December 2012	1	Paris 13th	(Bibliothèque François Mitterrand) (at a distance)	48°49′32″N 2°22′52″E	Avenue de France
Baron Le Roy	Île-de-France tramway Line 3a	15 December 2012	1	Paris 12th		48°49′46″N 2°23′25″E	Baron Le Roy
Porte de Charenton	Île-de-France tramway Line 3a	15 December 2012	1	Paris 12th	Paris Metro Paris Metro Line 8	48°49′54″N 2°23′52″E	Porte de Charenton
Porte Dorée	Île-de-France tramway Line 3a	15 December 2012	1	Paris 12th	Paris Metro Paris Metro Line 8	48°50′08″N 2°24′24″E	Porte Dorée
Montempoivre	Île-de-France tramway Line 3a	15 December 2012	1	Paris 12th		48°50′26″N 2°24′33″E	Montempoivre
Alexandra David-Néel	Île-de-France tramway Line 3a	15 December 2012	1	Paris 12th		48°50′39″N 2°24′37″E	Alexandra David-Néel
Porte de Vincennes	Île-de-France tramway Line 3a	15 December 2012	1	Paris 12th, 20th	Paris Metro Paris Metro Line 1 Tramways in Île-de-France Île-de-France tramway Line 3b	48°50′49″N 2°24′37″E	Porte de Vincennes
Porte de Vincennes	Île-de-France tramway Line 3b	15 December 2012	1	Paris 12th, 20th	Paris Metro Paris Metro Line 1 Tramways in Île-de-France Île-de-France tramway Line 3a	48°50′50″N 2°24′37″E	Porte de Vincennes
Porte de Montreuil	Île-de-France tramway Line 3b	15 December 2012	1	Paris 20th	Paris Metro Paris Metro Line 9	48°51′13″N 2°24′38″E	Porte de Montreuil
Marie de Miribel	Île-de-France tramway Line 3b	15 December 2012	1	Paris 20th		48°51′25″N 2°24′36″E	Marie de Miribel
Porte de Bagnolet	Île-de-France tramway Line 3b	15 December 2012	1	Paris 20th	Paris Metro Paris Metro Line 3	48°51′52″N 2°24′32″E	Porte de Bagnolet
Séverine	Île-de-France tramway Line 3b	15 December 2012	1	Paris 20th		48°52′10″N 2°24′32″E	Séverine
Adrienne Bolland	Île-de-France tramway Line 3b	15 December 2012	1	Paris 20th	(Saint-Fargeau) (at a distance)	48°52′22″N 2°24′31″E	Adrienne Bolland
Porte des Lilas	Île-de-France tramway Line 3b	15 December 2012	1	Paris 19th	Paris Metro Paris Metro Line 3bis Paris Metro Line 11	48°52′38″N 2°24′24″E	Porte des Lilas
Hôpital Robert-Debré	Île-de-France tramway Line 3b	15 December 2012	1	Paris 19th	(Pré-Saint-Gervais) (at a distance)	48°52′44″N 2°24′06″E	Hôpital Robert-Debré
Butte du Chapeau Rouge	Île-de-France tramway Line 3b	15 December 2012	1	Paris 19th		48°53′03″N 2°23′49″E	Butte du Chapeau Rouge
Porte de Pantin	Île-de-France tramway Line 3b	15 December 2012	1	Paris 19th	Paris Metro Paris Metro Line 5	48°53′19″N 2°23′45″E	Porte de Pantin
Delphine Seyrig	Île-de-France tramway Line 3b	15 December 2012	1	Paris 19th, Pantin		48°53′37″N 2°23′53″E	Delphine Seyrig
Ella Fitzgerald	Île-de-France tramway Line 3b	15 December 2012	1	Paris 19th, Pantin	(Pantin) (at a distance)	48°53′51″N 2°23′42″E	Ella Fitzgerald
Porte de la Villette	Île-de-France tramway Line 3b	15 December 2012	1	Paris 19th	Paris Metro Paris Metro Line 7	48°53′51″N 2°23′10″E	Porte de la Villette
Canal Saint-Denis	Île-de-France tramway Line 3b	15 December 2012	1	Paris 19th		48°53′56″N 2°22′54″E	Canal Saint-Denis
Rosa Parks	Île-de-France tramway Line 3b	15 December 2012	1	Paris 19th	RER RER E	48°53′49″N 2°22′24″E	Rosa Parks
Porte d'Aubervilliers	Île-de-France tramway Line 3b	15 December 2012	1	Paris 18th, 19th		48°53′55″N 2°22′06″E	Porte d'Aubervilliers
Colette Besson	Île-de-France tramway Line 3b	15 December 2012	1	Paris 18th		48°53′55″N 2°21′52″E	Colette Besson
Porte de la Chapelle	Île-de-France tramway Line 3b	15 December 2012	1	Paris 18th	Paris Metro Paris Metro Line 12	48°53′55″N 2°21′33″E	Porte de la Chapelle
Diane Arbus	Île-de-France tramway Line 3b	24 November 2018	1	Paris 18th		48°53′54″N 2°21′09″E	Diane Arbus
Porte de Clignancourt	Île-de-France tramway Line 3b	24 November 2018	1	Paris 18th	Paris Metro Paris Metro Line 4	48°53′53″N 2°20′40″E	Porte de Clignancourt
Angélique Compoint	Île-de-France tramway Line 3b	24 November 2018	1	Paris 18th		48°53′52″N 2°20′15″E	Angélique Compoint
Porte de Saint-Ouen	Île-de-France tramway Line 3b	24 November 2018	1	Paris 15th, 18th	Paris Metro Paris Metro Line 13	48°53′51″N 2°19′44″E	Porte de Saint-Ouen
Épinettes-Pouchet	Île-de-France tramway Line 3b	24 November 2018	1	Paris 15th		48°53′51″N 2°19′25″E	Épinettes-Pouchet
Honoré de Balzac	Île-de-France tramway Line 3b	24 November 2018	1	Paris 15th		48°53′44″N 2°19′02″E	Honoré de Balzac
Porte de Clichy	Île-de-France tramway Line 3b	24 November 2018	1	Paris 15th	RER RER C Paris Metro Paris Metro Line 13 Paris Metro Line 14	48°53′38″N 2°18′45″E	Porte de Clichy
Porte d'Asnières - Marguerite Long	Île-de-France tramway Line 3b	24 November 2018	1	Paris 15th		48°53′24″N 2°18′14″E	Porte d'Asnières - Marguerite Long
Bondy	Île-de-France tramway Line 4	18 November 2006	3	Bondy	RER RER E	48°53′39″N 2°28′49″E	Bondy
Remise à Jorelle	Île-de-France tramway Line 4	18 November 2006	3	Bondy		48°53′35″N 2°29′15″E	Remise à Jorelle
Les Coquetiers	Île-de-France tramway Line 4	18 November 2006	3	Villemomble		48°53′33″N 2°29′58″E	Les Coquetiers
Allée de la Tour - Rendez-Vous	Île-de-France tramway Line 4	18 November 2006	4	Villemomble		48°53′49″N 2°30′23″E	Allée de la Tour - Rendez-Vous
Les Pavillons-sous-Bois	Île-de-France tramway Line 4	18 November 2006	4	Le Raincy, Les Pavillons-sous-Bois		48°54′09″N 2°30′42″E	Les Pavillons-sous-Bois
Gargan	Île-de-France tramway Line 4	18 November 2006	4	Les Pavillons-sous-Bois		48°54′30″N 2°31′01″E	Gargan
Lycée Henri Sellier	Île-de-France tramway Line 4	18 November 2006	4	Livry-Gargan		48°54′58″N 2°30′54″E	Lycée Henri Sellier
L'Abbaye	Île-de-France tramway Line 4	18 November 2006	4	Livry-Gargan		48°55′19″N 2°30′59″E	L'Abbaye
Freinville - Sevran	Île-de-France tramway Line 4	18 November 2006	4	Sevran		48°55′36″N 2°31′09″E	Freinville - Sevran
Rougemont - Chanteloup	Île-de-France tramway Line 4	18 November 2006	4	Sevran, Aulnay-sous-Bois		48°55′51″N 2°30′55″E	Rougemont - Chanteloup
Aulnay-sous-Bois	Île-de-France tramway Line 4	18 November 2006	4	Aulnay-sous-Bois	RER RER B Transilien Transilien Line K (Paris-Nord)	48°55′55″N 2°29′47″E	Aulnay-sous-Bois
République - Marx Dormoy	Île-de-France tramway Line 4	14 December 2019	4	Livry-Gargan		48°54′22″N 2°31′25″E	République - Marx Dormoy
Léon Blum	Île-de-France tramway Line 4	14 December 2019	4	Livry-Gargan		48°54′30″N 2°31′57″E	Léon Blum
Maurice Audin	Île-de-France tramway Line 4	14 December 2019	4	Clichy-sous-Bois		48°54′30″N 2°32′26″E	Maurice Audin
Clichy-sous-Bois - Mairie	Île-de-France tramway Line 4	14 December 2019	4	Clichy-sous-Bois		48°54′29″N 2°32′46″E	Clichy-sous-Bois - Mairie
Romain Rolland	Île-de-France tramway Line 4	14 December 2019	4	Clichy-sous-Bois		48°54′17″N 2°32′52″E	Romain Rolland
Clichy - Montfermeil	Île-de-France tramway Line 4	14 December 2019	4	Clichy-sous-Bois		48°54′17″N 2°33′19″E	Clichy - Montfermeil
Notre-Dame des Anges	Île-de-France tramway Line 4	14 December 2019	4	Montfermeil		48°54′04″N 2°33′22″E	Notre-Dame des Anges
Arboretum	Île-de-France tramway Line 4	14 December 2019	4	Montfermeil		48°53′52″N 2°33′42″E	Arboretum
Marché de Saint-Denis	Île-de-France tramway Line 5	29 July 2013	3	Saint-Denis	Tramways in Île-de-France Île-de-France tramway Line 1	48°56′19″N 2°21′21″E	Marché de Saint-Denis
Baudelaire	Île-de-France tramway Line 5	29 July 2013	3	Saint-Denis		48°56′32″N 2°21′24″E	Baudelaire
Roger Sémat	Île-de-France tramway Line 5	29 July 2013	3	Saint-Denis		48°56′40″N 2°21′25″E	Roger Sémat
Guynemer	Île-de-France tramway Line 5	29 July 2013	3	Saint-Denis	(Saint-Denis - Université) (at a distance)	48°56′53″N 2°21′27″E	Guynemer
Petit Pierrefitte	Île-de-France tramway Line 5	29 July 2013	3	Pierrefitte		48°57′09″N 2°21′29″E	Petit Pierrefitte
Joncherolles	Île-de-France tramway Line 5	29 July 2013	3	Pierrefitte		48°57′20″N 2°21′30″E	Joncherolles
Suzanne Valadon	Île-de-France tramway Line 5	29 July 2013	3	Pierrefitte		48°57′33″N 2°21′32″E	Suzanne Valadon
Mairie de Pierrefitte	Île-de-France tramway Line 5	29 July 2013	4	Pierrefitte		48°57′48″N 2°21′35″E	Mairie de Pierrefitte
Alcide d'Orbigny	Île-de-France tramway Line 5	29 July 2013	4	Pierrefitte		48°57′56″N 2°21′48″E	Alcide d'Orbigny
Jacques Prévert	Île-de-France tramway Line 5	29 July 2013	4	Pierrefitte		48°58′16″N 2°21′58″E	Jacques Prévert
Butte Pinson	Île-de-France tramway Line 5	29 July 2013	4	Pierrefitte, Montmagny, Sarcelles		48°58′26″N 2°21′58″E	Butte Pinson
Les Cholettes	Île-de-France tramway Line 5	29 July 2013	4	Sarcelles		48°58′39″N 2°22′17″E	Les Cholettes
Les Flanades	Île-de-France tramway Line 5	29 July 2013	4	Sarcelles		48°58′36″N 2°22′38″E	Les Flanades
Paul Valéry	Île-de-France tramway Line 5	29 July 2013	4	Sarcelles		48°58′45″N 2°22′47″E	Paul Valéry
Lochères	Île-de-France tramway Line 5	29 July 2013	4	Sarcelles		48°58′42″N 2°23′08″E	Lochères
Garges–Sarcelles	Île-de-France tramway Line 5	29 July 2013	4	Sarcelles, Garges-lès-Gonesse	RER RER D	48°58′36″N 2°23′26″E	Garges–Sarcelles
Châtillon–Montrouge	Île-de-France tramway Line 6	13 December 2014	2 - 3	Châtillon, Montrouge	Paris Metro Paris Metro Line 13	48°48′38″N 2°18′07″E	Châtillon–Montrouge
Vauban	Île-de-France tramway Line 6	13 December 2014	3	Châtillon		48°48′25″N 2°17′37″E	Vauban
Centre de Châtillon	Île-de-France tramway Line 6	13 December 2014	3	Châtillon		48°48′14″N 2°17′19″E	
Parc André Malraux	Île-de-France tramway Line 6	13 December 2014	3	Châtillon		48°48′03″N 2°17′00″E	
Division Leclerc	Île-de-France tramway Line 6	13 December 2014	3	Châtillon, Fontenay-aux-Roses, Clamart		48°47′39″N 2°16′19″E	Division Leclerc
Soleil Levant	Île-de-France tramway Line 6	13 December 2014	3	Clamart		48°47′24″N 2°15′46″E	
Hôpital Béclère	Île-de-France tramway Line 6	13 December 2014	3	Clamart	Tramways in Île-de-France Île-de-France tramway Line 10	48°47′13″N 2°15′19″E	Hôpital Béclère
Mail de la Plaine	Île-de-France tramway Line 6	13 December 2014	3	Clamart		48°47′00″N 2°14′47″E	
Pavé Blanc	Île-de-France tramway Line 6	13 December 2014	3	Clamart		48°46′50″N 2°14′22″E	Pavé Blanc
Georges Pompidou	Île-de-France tramway Line 6	13 December 2014	3	Clamart		48°47′07″N 2°14′16″E	Georges Pompidou
Georges Millandy	Île-de-France tramway Line 6	13 December 2014	3	Clamart, Meudon		48°46′57″N 2°13′43″E	
Meudon-la-Forêt	Île-de-France tramway Line 6	13 December 2014	3	Meudon		48°47′02″N 2°13′29″E	Meudon-la-Forêt
Vélizy 2	Île-de-France tramway Line 6	13 December 2014	3	Vélizy-Villacoublay		48°47′06″N 2°13′08″E	Vélizy 2
Dewoitine	Île-de-France tramway Line 6	13 December 2014	3	Vélizy-Villacoublay		48°47′02″N 2°12′56″E	Dewoitine
Inovel Parc Nord	Île-de-France tramway Line 6	13 December 2014	3	Vélizy-Villacoublay		48°46′51″N 2°12′28″E	Inovel Parc Nord
Louvois	Île-de-France tramway Line 6	13 December 2014	3	Vélizy-Villacoublay		48°46′48″N 2°11′47″E	Louvois
Mairie de Vélizy	Île-de-France tramway Line 6	13 December 2014	3	Vélizy-Villacoublay		48°46′50″N 2°11′20″E	Mairie de Vélizy
L'Onde	Île-de-France tramway Line 6	13 December 2014	3	Vélizy-Villacoublay		48°46′54″N 2°10′53″E	L'Onde
Robert Wagner	Île-de-France tramway Line 6	13 December 2014	3	Vélizy-Villacoublay		48°47′11″N 2°10′46″E	Robert Wagner
Viroflay Rive Gauche	Île-de-France tramway Line 6	28 May 2016	3	Viroflay	RER RER C Transilien Transilien Line N (Paris-Montparnasse)	48°48′02″N 2°10′17″E	Viroflay Rive Gauche
Viroflay Rive Droite	Île-de-France tramway Line 6	28 May 2016	3	Viroflay	Transilien Transilien Line L (Paris-Saint-Lazare)	48°48′20″N 2°10′06″E	Viroflay Rive Droite
Villejuif–Louis Aragon	Île-de-France tramway Line 7	16 November 2013	3	Villejuif	Paris Metro Paris Metro Line 7	48°47′14″N 2°22′03″E	Villejuif–Louis Aragon
Lamartine	Île-de-France tramway Line 7	16 November 2013	3	Villejuif		48°46′57″N 2°22′02″E	
Domaine Chérioux	Île-de-France tramway Line 7	16 November 2013	3	Chevilly-Larue, Vitry-sur-Seine		48°46′44″N 2°22′02″E	
Moulin Vert	Île-de-France tramway Line 7	16 November 2013	3	Chevilly-Larue, Vitry-sur-Seine, Thiais		48°46′20″N 2°22′04″E	
Bretagne	Île-de-France tramway Line 7	16 November 2013	3	Chevilly-Larue, Thiais		48°46′06″N 2°22′05″E	
Auguste Perret	Île-de-France tramway Line 7	16 November 2013	3	Chevilly-Larue, Thiais		48°45′49″N 2°22′05″E	Auguste Perret
Porte de Thiais	Île-de-France tramway Line 7	16 November 2013	3	Chevilly-Larue	Tvm	48°45′35″N 2°21′59″E	Porte de Thiais
La Belle Épine	Île-de-France tramway Line 7	16 November 2013	3	Rungis, Thiais		48°45′24″N 2°22′07″E	La Belle Épine
Place de la Logistique	Île-de-France tramway Line 7	16 November 2013	3	Rungis		48°45′11″N 2°21′43″E	Place de la Logistique
Porte de Rungis	Île-de-France tramway Line 7	16 November 2013	3	Rungis		48°45′09″N 2°21′18″E	Porte de Rungis
Saarinen	Île-de-France tramway Line 7	16 November 2013	3	Rungis		48°45′01″N 2°21′15″E	Saarinen
Robert Schuman	Île-de-France tramway Line 7	16 November 2013	4	Rungis		48°44′48″N 2°21′11″E	Robert Schuman
La Fraternelle	Île-de-France tramway Line 7	16 November 2013	4	Rungis	RER RER C	48°44′30″N 2°21′10″E	La Fraternelle
Hélène Boucher	Île-de-France tramway Line 7	16 November 2013	4	Paray-Vieille-Poste		48°44′23″N 2°21′45″E	Hélène Boucher
Caroline Aigle	Île-de-France tramway Line 7	16 November 2013	4	Orly		48°44′12″N 2°22′11″E	Caroline Aigle
Cœur d'Orly	Île-de-France tramway Line 7	16 November 2013	4	Orly		48°43′56″N 2°22′19″E	Cœur d'Orly
Aéroport d'Orly	Île-de-France tramway Line 7	16 November 2013	4	Paray-Vieille-Poste		48°43′44″N 2°22′06″E	Aéroport d'Orly
Porte de l'Essonne	Île-de-France tramway Line 7	16 November 2013	4	Athis-Mons		48°42′51″N 2°22′18″E	Porte de l'Essonne
Saint-Denis–Porte de Paris	Île-de-France tramway Line 8	16 December 2014	3	Saint-Denis	Paris Metro Paris Metro Line 13	48°55′47″N 2°21′29″E	Saint-Denis–Porte de Paris
Pierre de Geyter	Île-de-France tramway Line 8	16 December 2014	3	Saint-Denis		48°55′57″N 2°21′07″E	
Saint-Denis–Gare	Île-de-France tramway Line 8	16 December 2014	3	Saint-Denis	RER RER D Transilien Transilien Line H (Paris-Nord) Tramways in Île-de-France Île-de-France tramway Line 1	48°56′08″N 2°20′51″E	Saint-Denis–Gare
Paul Éluard	Île-de-France tramway Line 8	16 December 2014	3	Saint-Denis		48°56′24″N 2°20′43″E	Paul Éluard
Delaunay-Belleville	Île-de-France tramway Line 8	16 December 2014	3	Saint-Denis		48°56′45″N 2°20′50″E	Delaunay-Belleville
César	Île-de-France tramway Line 8	16 December 2014	3	Villetaneuse		48°56′58″N 2°20′33″E	César
Jean Vilar	Île-de-France tramway Line 8	16 December 2014	3	Villetaneuse		48°57′12″N 2°20′37″E	
Pablo Neruda	Île-de-France tramway Line 8	16 December 2014	3	Villetaneuse		48°57′24″N 2°20′38″E	Pablo Neruda
Villetaneuse-Université	Île-de-France tramway Line 8	16 December 2014	3	Villetaneuse	Tramways in Île-de-France Île-de-France tramway Line 11	48°57′34″N 2°20′31″E	Villetaneuse-Université
Blumenthal	Île-de-France tramway Line 8	16 December 2014	3	Épinay-sur-Seine		48°56′53″N 2°20′19″E	
Les Mobiles	Île-de-France tramway Line 8	16 December 2014	3	Épinay-sur-Seine		48°57′00″N 2°19′44″E	
Les Béatus	Île-de-France tramway Line 8	16 December 2014	3	Épinay-sur-Seine		48°57′06″N 2°19′13″E	
Rose Bertin	Île-de-France tramway Line 8	16 December 2014	3	Épinay-sur-Seine		48°57′11″N 2°18′56″E	Rose Bertin
Lacépède	Île-de-France tramway Line 8	16 December 2014	3	Épinay-sur-Seine		48°57′19″N 2°18′44″E	Lacépède
Gilbert Bonnemaison	Île-de-France tramway Line 8	16 December 2014	3	Épinay-sur-Seine		48°57′19″N 2°18′29″E	Gilbert Bonnemaison
Épinay-sur-Seine–Gare	Île-de-France tramway Line 8	16 December 2014	3	Épinay-sur-Seine	RER RER C Tramways in Île-de-France Île-de-France tramway Line 11	48°57′21″N 2°18′07″E	Épinay-sur-Seine–Gare
Épinay-Orgemont	Île-de-France tramway Line 8	16 December 2014	3	Épinay-sur-Seine		48°57′20″N 2°17′45″E	Épinay-Orgemont
Porte de Choisy	Île-de-France tramway Line 9	10 April 2021	1	Paris 13th	Paris Metro Paris Metro Line 7 Tramways in Île-de-France Île-de-France tramway Line 3a	48°49′10″N 2°21′55″E	Porte de Choisy
Châteaudun - Barbès	Île-de-France tramway Line 9	10 April 2021	2	Ivry-sur-Seine		48°48′56″N 2°22′06″E	Châteaudun - Barbès
Cimetière Parisien d'Ivry	Île-de-France tramway Line 9	10 April 2021	2	Ivry-sur-Seine		48°48′45″N 2°22′14″E	Cimetière Parisien d'Ivry
La Briqueterie	Île-de-France tramway Line 9	10 April 2021	2	Ivry-sur-Seine, Vitry-sur-Seine		48°48′26″N 2°22′30″E	La Briqueterie
Germaine Tailleferre	Île-de-France tramway Line 9	10 April 2021	3	Vitry-sur-Seine		48°48′12″N 2°22′40″E	Germaine Tailleferre
Beethoven - Concorde	Île-de-France tramway Line 9	10 April 2021	3	Vitry-sur-Seine		48°47′56″N 2°22′53″E	Beethoven - Concorde
Musée MAC-VAL	Île-de-France tramway Line 9	10 April 2021	3	Vitry-sur-Seine		48°47′34″N 2°23′10″E	Musée MAC-VAL
Mairie de Vitry-sur-Seine	Île-de-France tramway Line 9	10 April 2021	3	Vitry-sur-Seine	Paris Metro Paris Metro Line 15	48°47′26″N 2°23′18″E	Mairie de Vitry-sur-Seine
Camille Groult	Île-de-France tramway Line 9	10 April 2021	3	Vitry-sur-Seine		48°47′08″N 2°23′31″E	Camille Groult
Constant Coquelin	Île-de-France tramway Line 9	10 April 2021	3	Vitry-sur-Seine		48°46′59″N 2°23′38″E	Constant Coquelin
Watteau - Rondenay	Île-de-France tramway Line 9	10 April 2021	3	Vitry-sur-Seine		48°46′43″N 2°23′47″E	Watteau - Rondenay
Trois Communes	Île-de-France tramway Line 9	10 April 2021	3	Vitry-sur-Seine, Thiais, Choisy-le-Roi		48°46′23″N 2°23′58″E	Trois Communes
Verdun - Hoche	Île-de-France tramway Line 9	10 April 2021	3	Choisy-le-Roi		48°46′06″N 2°24′10″E	Verdun - Hoche
Rouget de Lisle	Île-de-France tramway Line 9	10 April 2021	3	Choisy-le-Roi	Tvm 393	48°45′50″N 2°24′21″E	Rouget de Lisle
Carle - Darthé	Île-de-France tramway Line 9	10 April 2021	3	Choisy-le-Roi		48°45′33″N 2°24′32″E	Carle - Darthé
Four - Peary	Île-de-France tramway Line 9	10 April 2021	3	Choisy-le-Roi		48°45′16″N 2°24′43″E	Four - Peary
Christophe Colomb	Île-de-France tramway Line 9	10 April 2021	4	Choisy-le-Roi		48°45′08″N 2°25′01″E	Christophe Colomb
Les Saules	Île-de-France tramway Line 9	10 April 2021	4	Orly	RER RER C	48°44′49″N 2°24′59″E	Les Saules
Orly - Gaston Viens	Île-de-France tramway Line 9	10 April 2021	4	Orly		48°44′42″N 2°24′30″E	Orly - Gaston Viens
La Croix de Berny	Île-de-France tramway Line 10	24 June 2023	3	Antony	Tvm	48°45′47″N 2°18′18″E	La Croix de Berny
La Vallée	Île-de-France tramway Line 10	24 June 2023	3	Antony		48°45′41″N 2°17′50″E	La Vallée
Petit-Châtenay	Île-de-France tramway Line 10	24 June 2023	3	Antony, Châtenay-Malabry		48°45′41″N 2°17′27″E	Petit-Châtenay
Théâtre La Piscine	Île-de-France tramway Line 10	24 June 2023	3	Châtenay-Malabry		48°45′46″N 2°16′48″E	Théâtre La Piscine
Les Peintres	Île-de-France tramway Line 10	24 June 2023	3	Châtenay-Malabry		48°45′50″N 2°16′19″E	Les Peintres
Cité-Jardin	Île-de-France tramway Line 10	24 June 2023	3	Châtenay-Malabry		48°45′56″N 2°15′37″E	Cité-Jardin
Vallée aux Loups	Île-de-France tramway Line 10	24 June 2023	3	Châtenay-Malabry		48°46′05″N 2°15′07″E	Vallée aux Loups
Malabry	Île-de-France tramway Line 10	24 June 2023	3	Le Plessis-Robinson		48°46′23″N 2°14′57″E	Malabry
Noveos	Île-de-France tramway Line 10	24 June 2023	3	Le Plessis-Robinson		48°46′39″N 2°15′01″E	Noveos
Parc des Sports	Île-de-France tramway Line 10	24 June 2023	3	Le Plessis-Robinson		48°46′46″N 2°15′06″E	Parc des Sports
Le Hameau	Île-de-France tramway Line 10	24 June 2023	3	Le Plessis-Robinson		48°46′56″N 2°15′11″E	Le Hameau
Hôpital Béclère	Île-de-France tramway Line 10	24 June 2023	3	Clamart	Tramways in Île-de-France Île-de-France tramway Line 6	48°47′17″N 2°15′11″E	Hôpital Béclère
Jardin Parisien	Île-de-France tramway Line 10	24 June 2023	3	Clamart		48°47′30″N 2°15′09″E	Jardin Parisien
Épinay-sur-Seine	Île-de-France tramway Line 11	1 July 2017	3	Épinay-sur-Seine	RER RER C Tramways in Île-de-France Île-de-France tramway Line 8	48°57′15″N 2°18′08″E	Épinay-sur-Seine
Épinay–Villetaneuse	Île-de-France tramway Line 11	1 July 2017	3	Épinay-sur-Seine	Transilien Transilien Line H (Paris-Nord)	48°57′30″N 2°19′42″E	Épinay–Villetaneuse
Villetaneuse-Université	Île-de-France tramway Line 11	1 July 2017	3	Villetaneuse	Tramways in Île-de-France Île-de-France tramway Line 8	48°57′34″N 2°20′31″E	Villetaneuse-Université
Pierrefitte–Stains	Île-de-France tramway Line 11	1 July 2017	3	Pierrefitte-sur-Seine	RER RER D	48°57′50″N 2°22′20″E	Pierrefitte–Stains
Stains-La Cerisaie	Île-de-France tramway Line 11	1 July 2017	3	Stains		48°57′16″N 2°23′31″E	Stains-La Cerisaie
Dugny-La Courneuve	Île-de-France tramway Line 11	1 July 2017	3	Dugny, La Courneuve		48°56′37″N 2°24′40″E	Dugny - La Courneuve
Le Bourget	Île-de-France tramway Line 11	1 July 2017	3	Le Bourget	RER RER B	48°55′50″N 2°25′33″E	Le Bourget
Saint-Germain-en-Laye	Île-de-France tramway Line 13	6 July 2022	4	Saint-Germain-en-Laye	RER RER A	48°53′54″N 2°05′42″E	Saint-Germain-en-Laye
Camp des Loges	Île-de-France tramway Line 13	6 July 2022	4	Saint-Germain-en-Laye		48°54′49″N 2°04′49″E	Camp des Loges
Lisière Pereire	Île-de-France tramway Line 13	6 July 2022	4	Saint-Germain-en-Laye		48°54′15″N 2°04′23″E	Lisière Pereire
Fourqueux - Bel-Air	Île-de-France tramway Line 13	6 July 2022	4	Saint-Germain-en-Laye		48°53′44″N 2°04′13″E	Fourqueux - Bel-Air
Mareil-Marly	Île-de-France tramway Line 13	6 July 2022	4	Mareil-Marly		48°52′52″N 2°04′46″E	Mareil-Marly
L'Étang - Les Sablons	Île-de-France tramway Line 13	6 July 2022	5	L'Étang-la-Ville		48°52′21″N 2°04′09″E	L'Étang - Les Sablons
Saint-Nom-la-Bretèche–Forêt de Marly	Île-de-France tramway Line 13	6 July 2022	5	L'Étang-la-Ville	Transilien Transilien Line L (Paris-Saint-Lazare)	48°52′04″N 2°03′04″E	Saint-Nom-la-Bretèche–Forêt de Marly
Noisy-le-Roi	Île-de-France tramway Line 13	6 July 2022	5	Noisy-le-Roi		48°50′29″N 2°03′43″E	Noisy-le-Roi
Bailly	Île-de-France tramway Line 13	6 July 2022	5	Bailly		48°50′14″N 2°04′27″E	Bailly
Allée Royale	Île-de-France tramway Line 13	19 July 2022	5	Saint-Cyr-l'École		48°48′56″N 2°04′44″E	Allée Royale
Les Portes de Saint-Cyr	Île-de-France tramway Line 13	6 July 2022	5	Versailles		48°48′24″N 2°04′38″E	Les Portes de Saint-Cyr
Saint-Cyr	Île-de-France tramway Line 13	6 July 2022	5	Saint-Cyr-l'École	RER RER C Transilien Transilien Line N (Paris-Montparnasse) Transilien Line U	48°47′57″N 2°04′27″E	Saint-Cyr

== See also ==
- Tramways in Île-de-France
- List of Paris Metro stations
- List of Réseau Express Régional stations
- List of Transilien stations
