= Grande ceinture Ouest =

Railway section in France

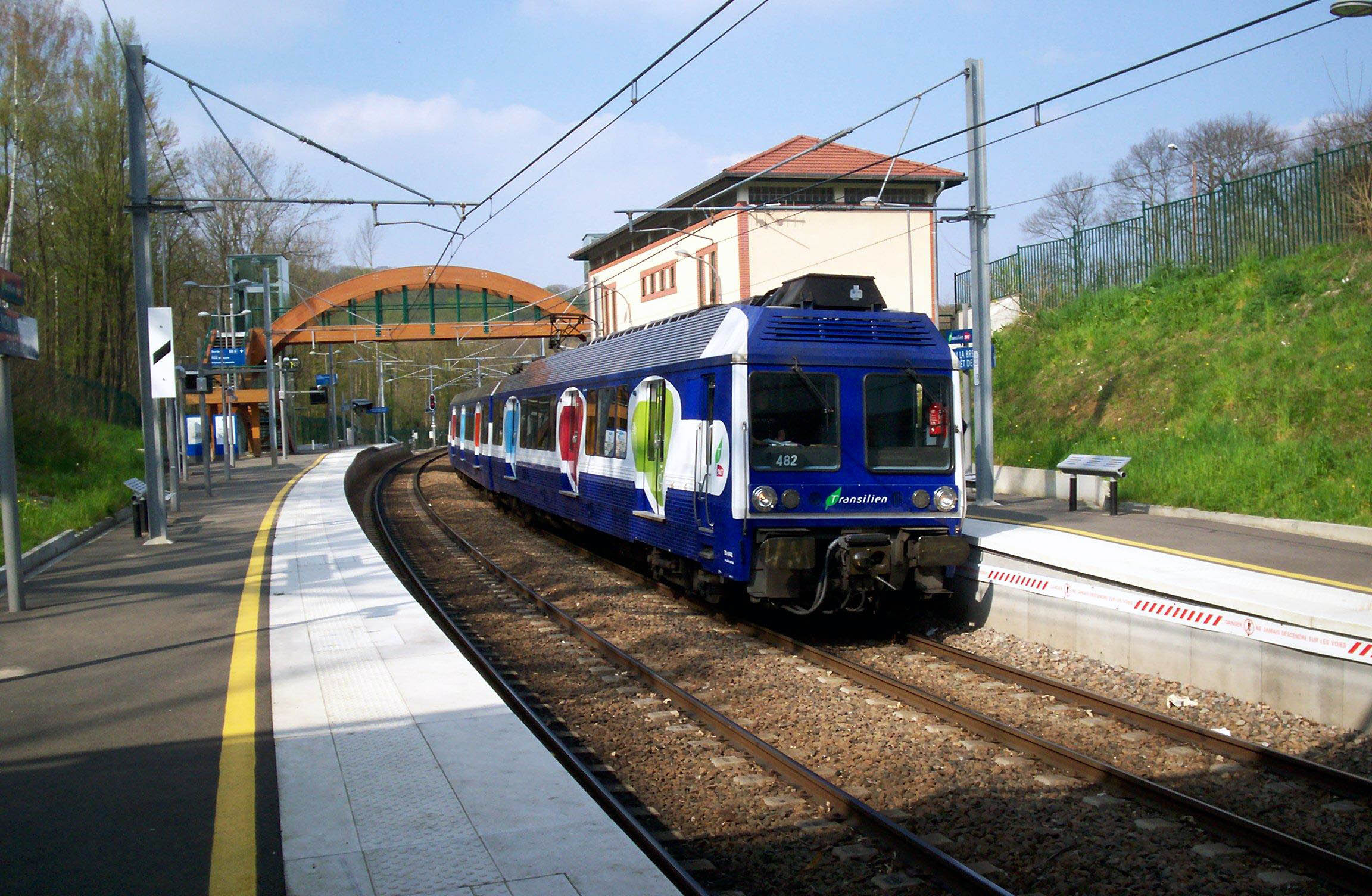
A GCO train at Saint-Nom-La-Bretèche station in Marly

The Grande ceinture Ouest line (French - Ligne Grande ceinture Ouest, or GCO) is a 10 km long section of the Grande Ceinture de Paris, located in Yvelines and reopened to the public on 12 December 2004, after being closed to passengers for 68 years. Service was provided by Transilien Line L. Managed by the SNCF, it links Saint-Germain-en-Laye (gare de Grande-Ceinture) to Noisy-le-Roi, via Saint-Nom-la-Bretèche. In July 2022, service on this line was taken over by tramway line T13, providing service from Saint-Germain-en-Laye RER station and to Saint-Cyr.

== See also ==
- Ligne de Grande Ceinture | Ligne de Petite Ceinture
- Transilien | Transilien Paris Saint-Lazare
- Z 6400
- Tangentielle Nord
