= Saint-Germain-en-Laye–Grande-Ceinture station =

Railway station in Saint-Germain-en-Laye, France

Coordinates: 48°54′11″N 2°4′23″E

Lisière Pereire
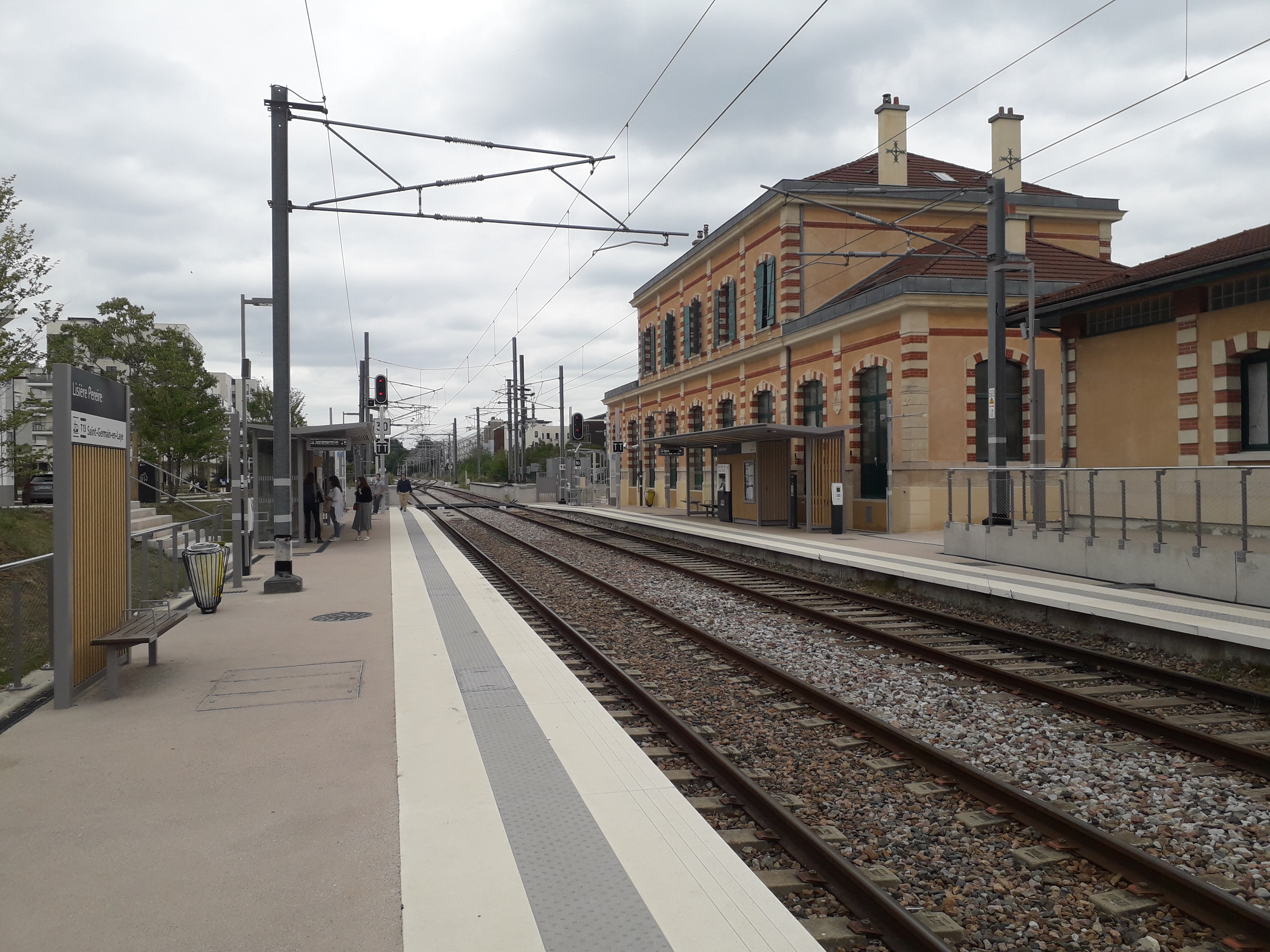
- Tramway stop and old station building

General information
- Location: Place Christiane-Frahier; 78100 Saint-Germain-en-Laye; France
- Operator: SNCF

Construction
- Accessible: Yes

Other information
- Station code: 87382804
- Fare zone: 3

History
- Opened: 1877
- Former names: Saint-Germain-en-Laye–Grande-Ceinture

Passengers
- 2023: 521,227

Services
Preceding station	Tram	Following station
Camp de Loges towards Saint-Germain-en-Laye	T13 since 2022	Fourqueux - Bel Air towards Saint-Cyr

Previous service
Preceding station	Transilien	Following station
Terminus	Line L from 2004 to 2022	Saint-Germain-en-Laye-Bel Air-Fourqueux towards Noisy-le-Roi
Location

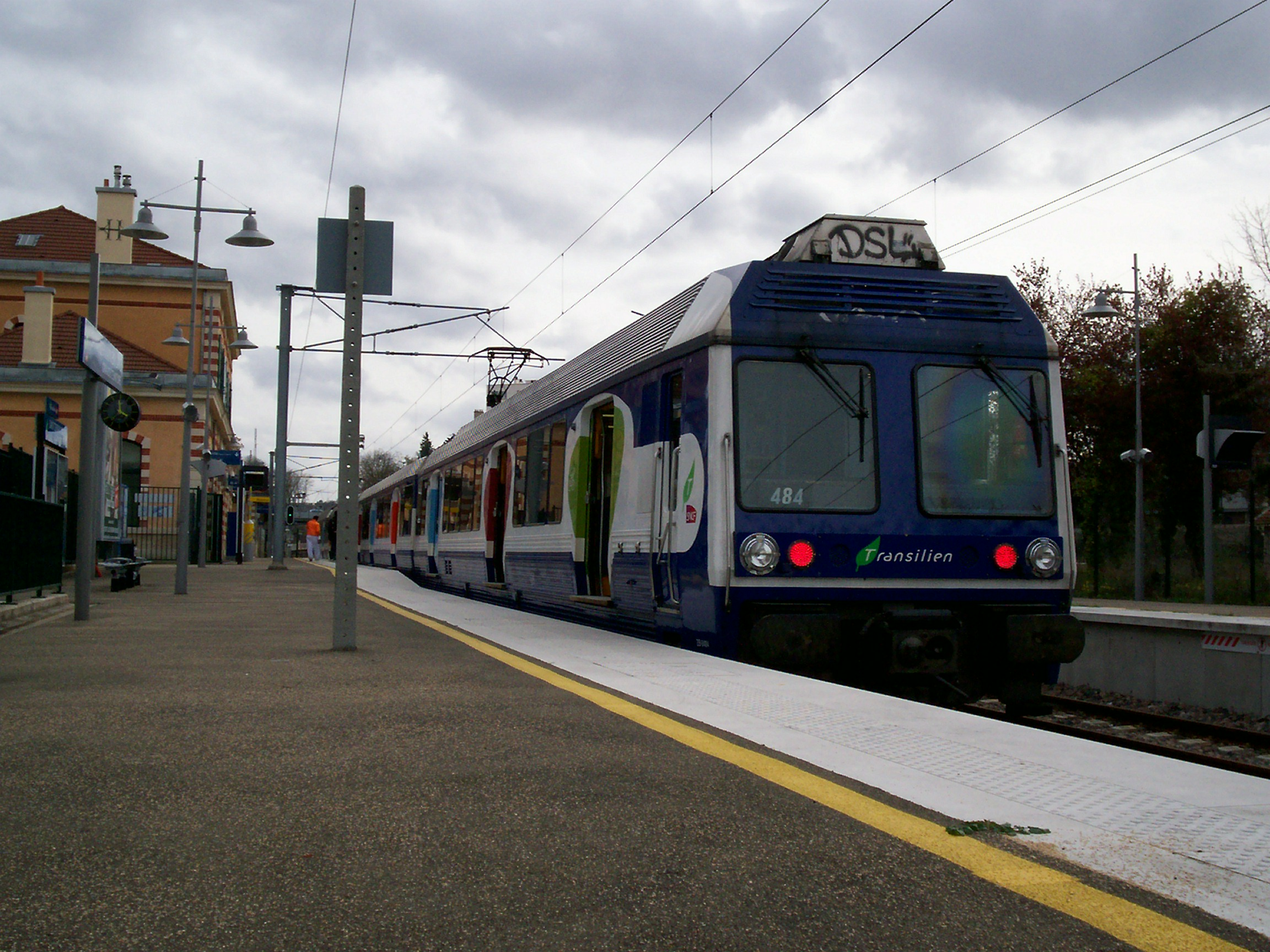
St Germain's Grande-Ceinture station with a Transilien train (2004–2022)

Saint-Germain-en-Laye–Grande-Ceinture is railway station in Saint-Germain-en-Laye, France, serving as a tram stop called Lisière Péreire. Its creation was decided on 11 March 1875 and opened in 1877. The station was built as a passenger stop on the Grande Ceinture line but the line soon lost its passenger traffic only to become a goods station. The station reopened to passenger service on 29 November 2004 as part of Transilien Line L, connecting it to Noisy-le-Roi, a short line known as Grande ceinture Ouest. In July 2022, service on this line was taken over by tramway line T13 with the tram stop named as Lisière Péreire. This service provides a connection to the Saint-Germain-en-Laye RER station and to Saint-Cyr via Noisy-le-Roi.
