= Dominique Franco =

French surgeon and professor

Dominique Franco is the president of the French Académie nationale de chirurgie. He is Emeritus Professor of Surgery at Paris-Saclay University. He formerly was head of the Hepatic Surgery and Transplantation department at Hôpital Antoine-Béclère. His career was especially focused on liver surgery and treatment of hepatocellular carcinoma. He was on the surgical team which performed the first liver transplantation in Europe. He is also advisor on instruction at the biomedical research center Institut Pasteur.
