= Guynemer =

Guynemer may refer to:

- Georges Guynemer (1894–1917) French WWI flying ace
- Guynemer of Boulogne, Boulognese pirate and Crusader of the First Crusade
- Monument Guynemer, Guynemer Square, Poelkapelle, Flanders, Belgium; see List of World War I memorials and cemeteries in Flanders
- Guynemer, Saint-Denis, Ile-de-France, France; a tram stop; see List of tram stops in Île-de-France
- Mikumo Guynemer (Japanese: 美雲・ギンヌメール), a fictional character from Macross Delta; see List of Macross Delta characters

== See also ==
- Célestin Guynemer de la Hailandière (1798–1882) Bishop of Vincennes
