= Saint-Nom-la-Bretèche–Forêt de Marly station =

Railway station in L'Étang-la-Ville, France

Coordinates: 48°52′04″N 2°03′04″E

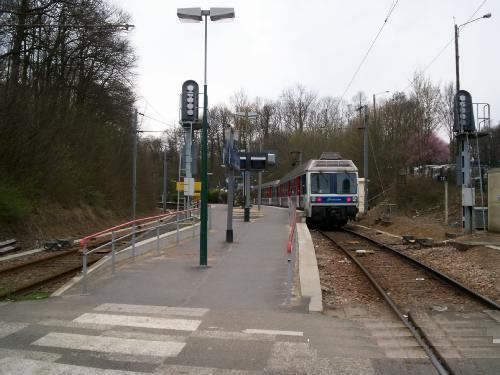
Transilien Line L station

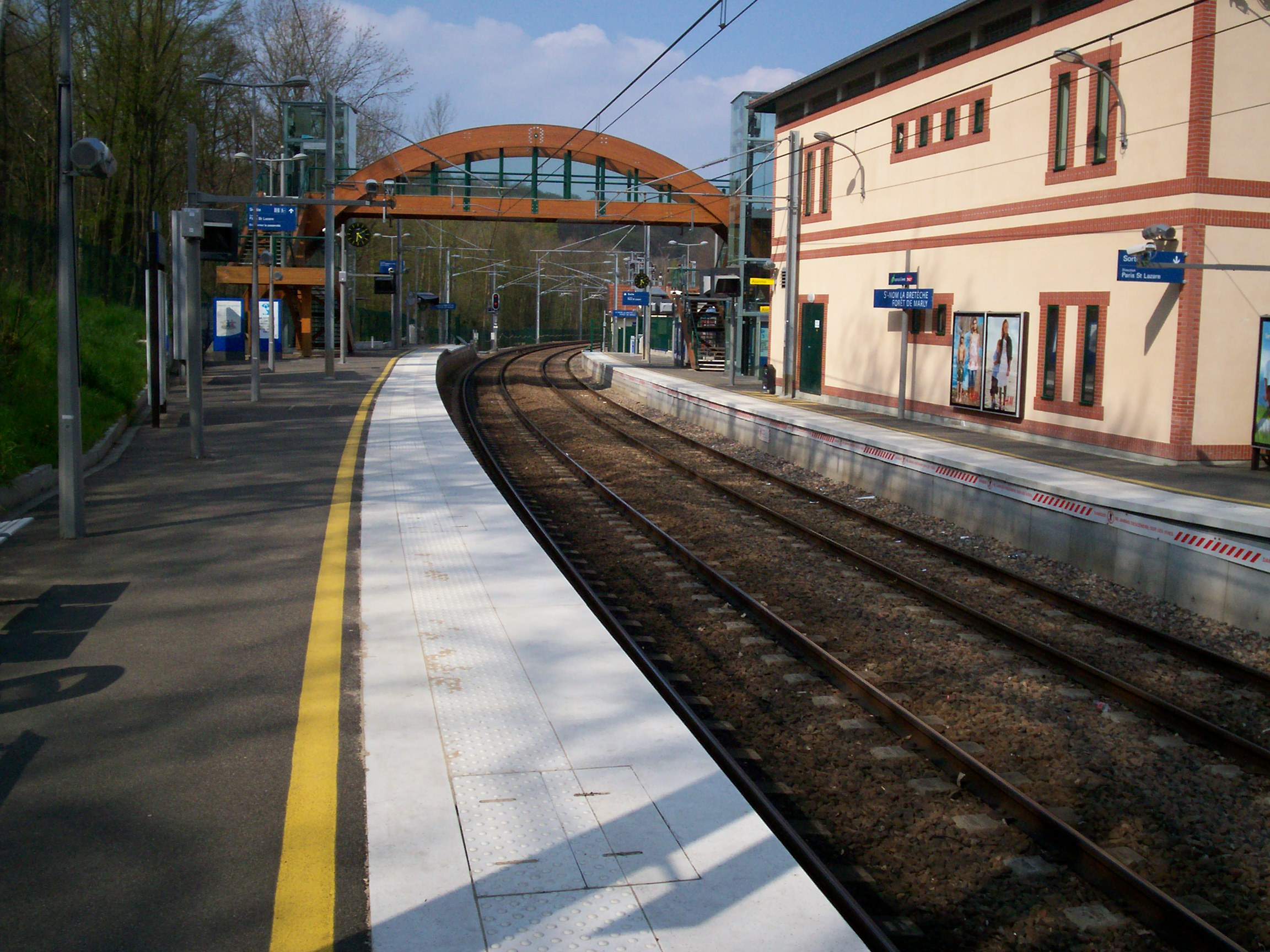
Tram station

Saint-Nom-la-Bretèche–Forêt de Marly is a railway station in the French commune of L'Étang-la-Ville in the département of Yvelines. Its name derives from Saint-Nom-la-Bretèche and the Forêt de Marly. It links to the Centre et Sud Yvelines bus lines 1 and 2, and Saint Germain Boucles de Seine bus line 15.

It is one of the western termini of Line L of the Transilien Paris-Saint-Lazare suburban railway, made up of one platform between two lines.

== Tram station ==
It is served by Île-de-France tramway Line 13 Express which opened in 2022 largely using track of the existing Grande Ceinture line, towards Saint Cyr L'École and Saint-Germain-en-Laye.

Preceding station	Transilien	Following station
Terminus	Line L	L'Étang-la-Ville towards Paris–Saint Lazare
Preceding station	Tram	Following station
L'Étang–Les Sablons towards Saint-Germain-en-Laye	T13	Noisy-le-Roi towards Saint-Cyr
