= Noisy-le-Roi station =

Former railway station in Noisy-le-Roi, France

Noisy-le-Roi
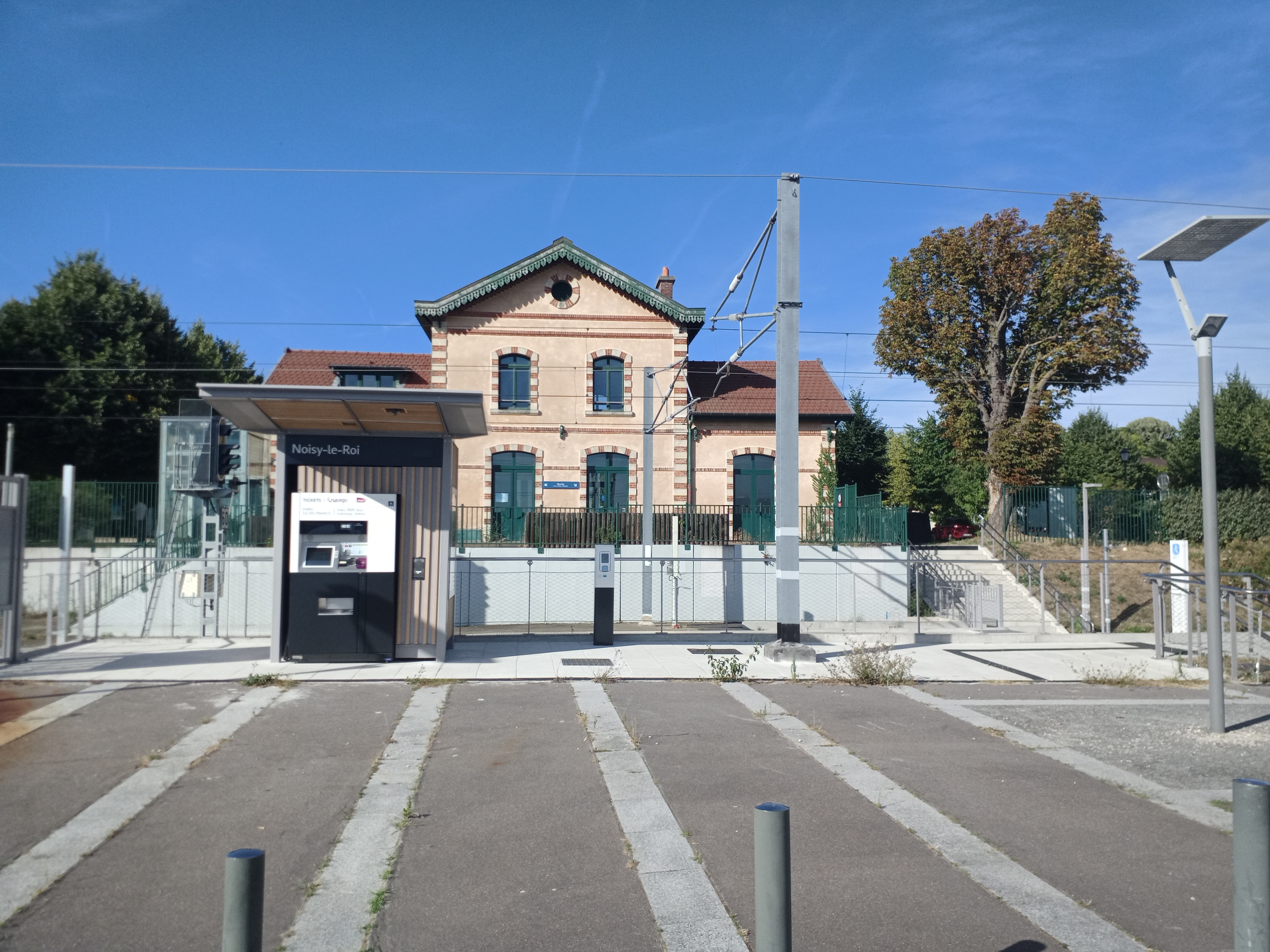
- Ticket machine and station access in 2022. The former passenger building is visible in the background.

General information
- Location: Place de la Gare; 78590 Noisy-le-Roi; Yvelines; France
- Coordinates: 48°50′29″N 2°3′43″E
- Elevation: 133 metres (436 ft)
- Owner: SNCF
- Operator: Transkeo
- Lines: Grande Ceinture line
- Platforms: 2
- Tracks: 2

Other information
- Fare zone: 5 (Île-de-France)

History
- Opened: 1: 4 September 1882; 2: 12 December 2004; 3: 6 July 2022
- Closed: 1: 15 May 1939; 2: 5 July 2019

Services
Preceding station	Tram	Following station
Saint-Nom-la-Bretèche–Forêt de Marly towards Saint-Germain-en-Laye	T13	Bailley towards Saint-Cyr
Location

Noisy-le-Roi (French pronunciation: [nwazi l(ə) ʁwa]; French: Gare de Noisy-le-Roi) is a former railway station in the town of Noisy-le-Roi, Yvelines department, northern France. It is on the western part of the Grande Ceinture line.

Until 6 July 2019, it was part of Transilien Line L; it became part of Île-de-France tramway Line 13 Express as a tram stop on 6 July 2022.

== Gallery ==
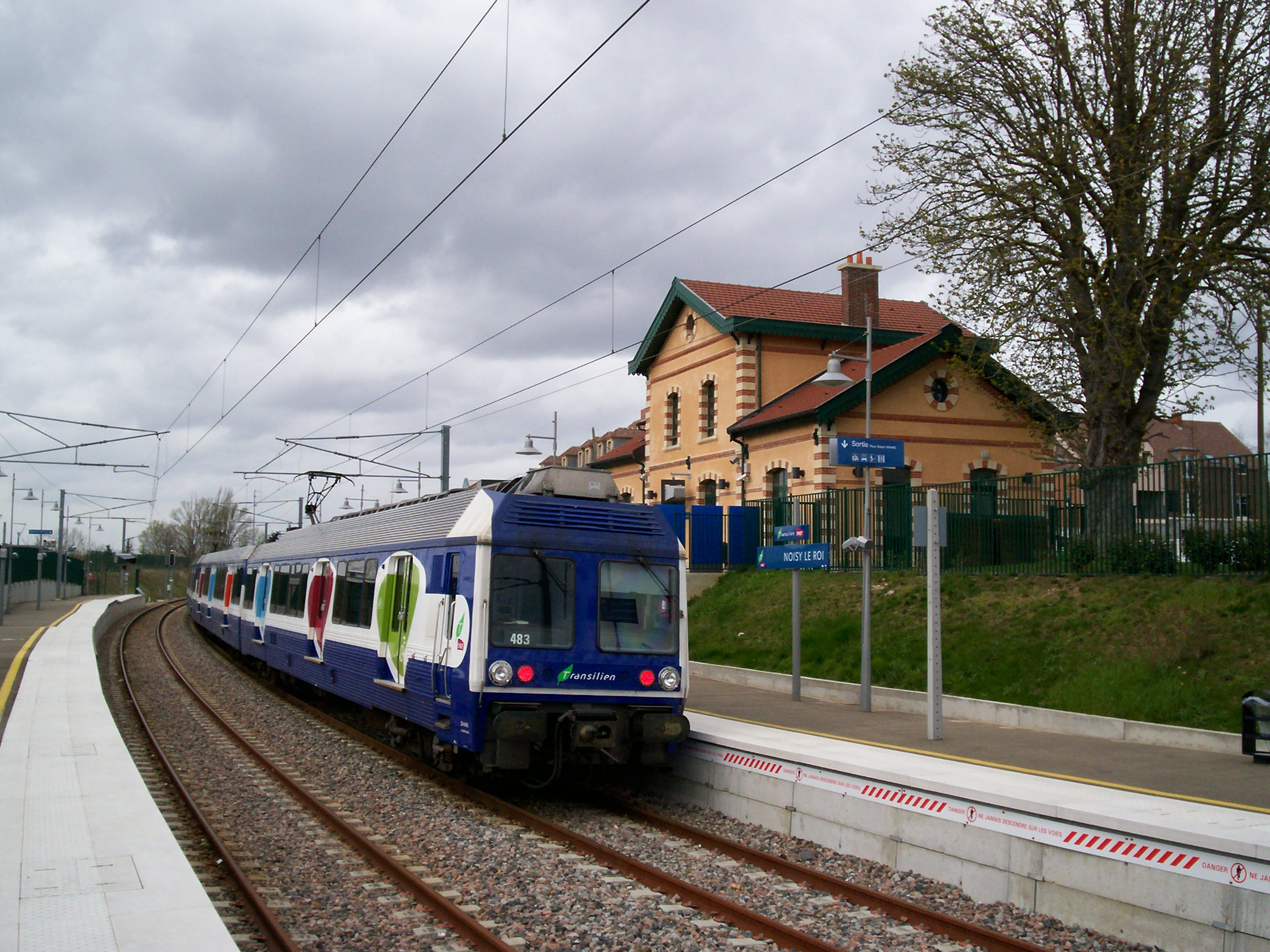
Platforms in 2008

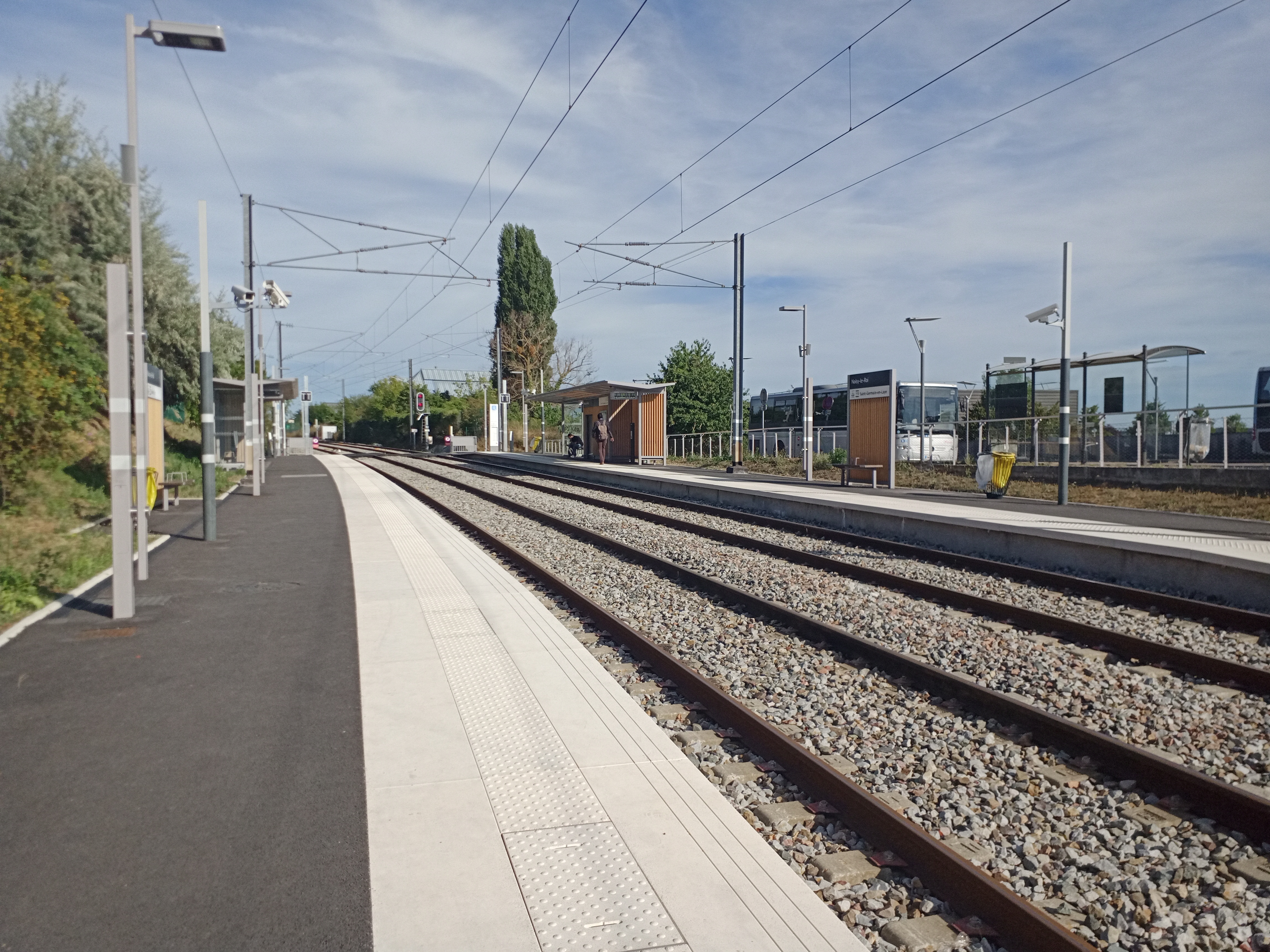
Tram stop in 2022
