= Île-de-France tramway Line 13 Express =

Tram line in Yvelines, west of Paris

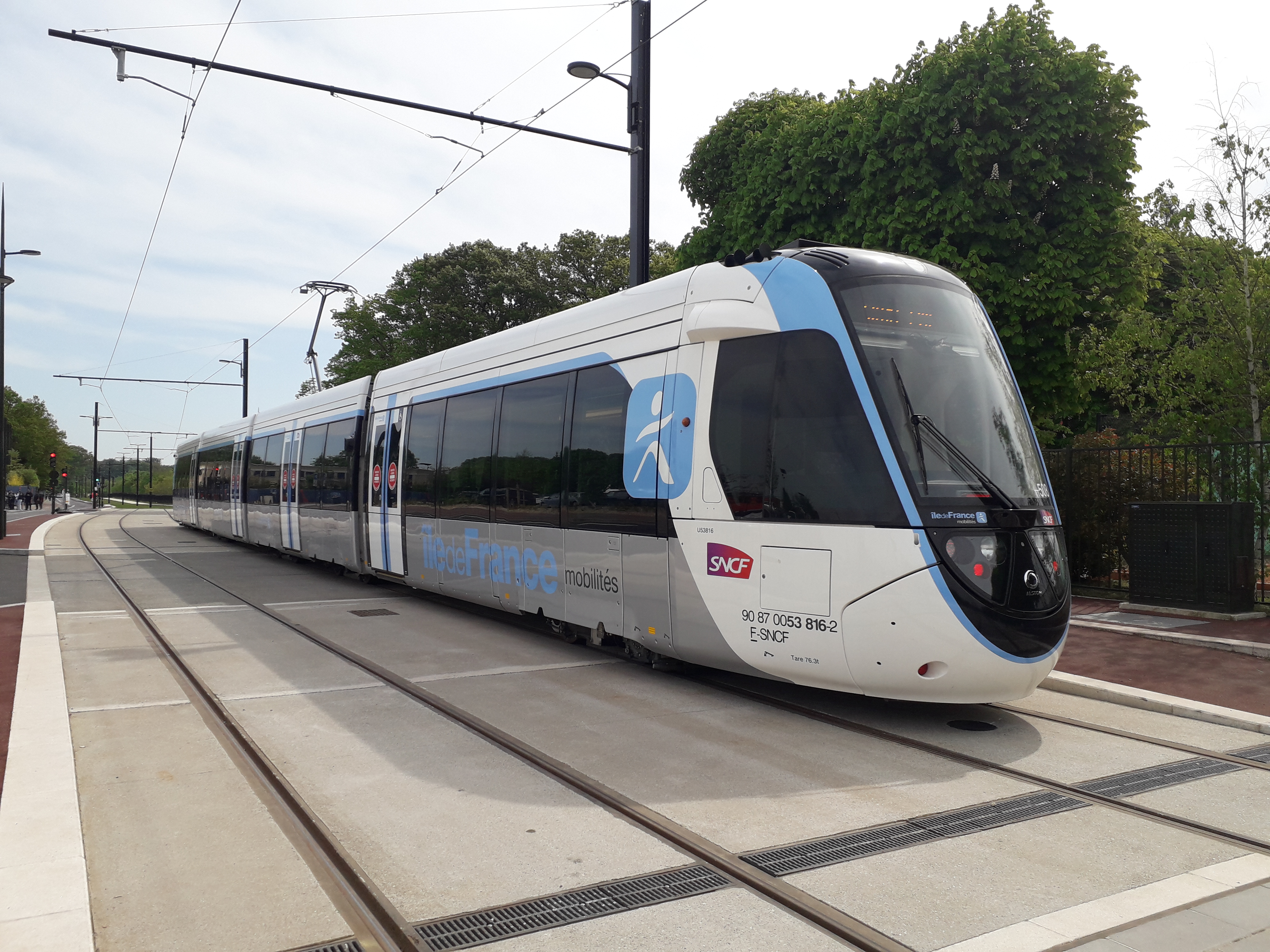
- Île-de-France tramway Line 13 Express at Camp des Loges

Overview
- Owner: Île-de-France Mobilités
- Termini: Saint-Germain-en-Laye; Saint-Cyr
- Stations: 12

Service
- Type: Tram-train
- System: Tramways in Île-de-France
- Operator: RATP Cap Arc Sud et Ouest
- Rolling stock: Alstom Citadis Dualis

History
- Opened: 6 July 2022; 4 years ago

Technical
- Line length: 18.8 km (11.7 mi)
- Track gauge: 1,435 mm (4 ft 8 1/2 in) standard gauge
Route map

Île-de-France tramway Line 13 Express (T13 Express; French: Ligne 13 Express du tramway d'Île-de-France, known as the Tangentielle Ouest and Tram Express Ouest in the planning phase) is a suburban tram-train line in Yvelines, west of Paris, which opened on 6 July 2022. The line is operated by RATP Cap Arc Sud et Ouest.

The line replaced a former branch of Transilien Line L between Saint-Germain-en-Laye–Grande-Ceinture station and Noisy-le-Roi station, going further north to Saint-Germain-en-Laye station and further south to Saint-Cyr station.

== Route ==
The line is 19 kilometres (12 miles) long, with service taking 32 minutes. It connects the communes of Saint-Germain-en-Laye (north) and Saint-Cyr-l'École (south), in the western outer suburbs of Paris. It has interchanges with existing SNCF Transilien lines L, N and U, as well as Réseau Express Régional (RER) lines A and C. It partially runs on the former Grande ceinture Ouest line.

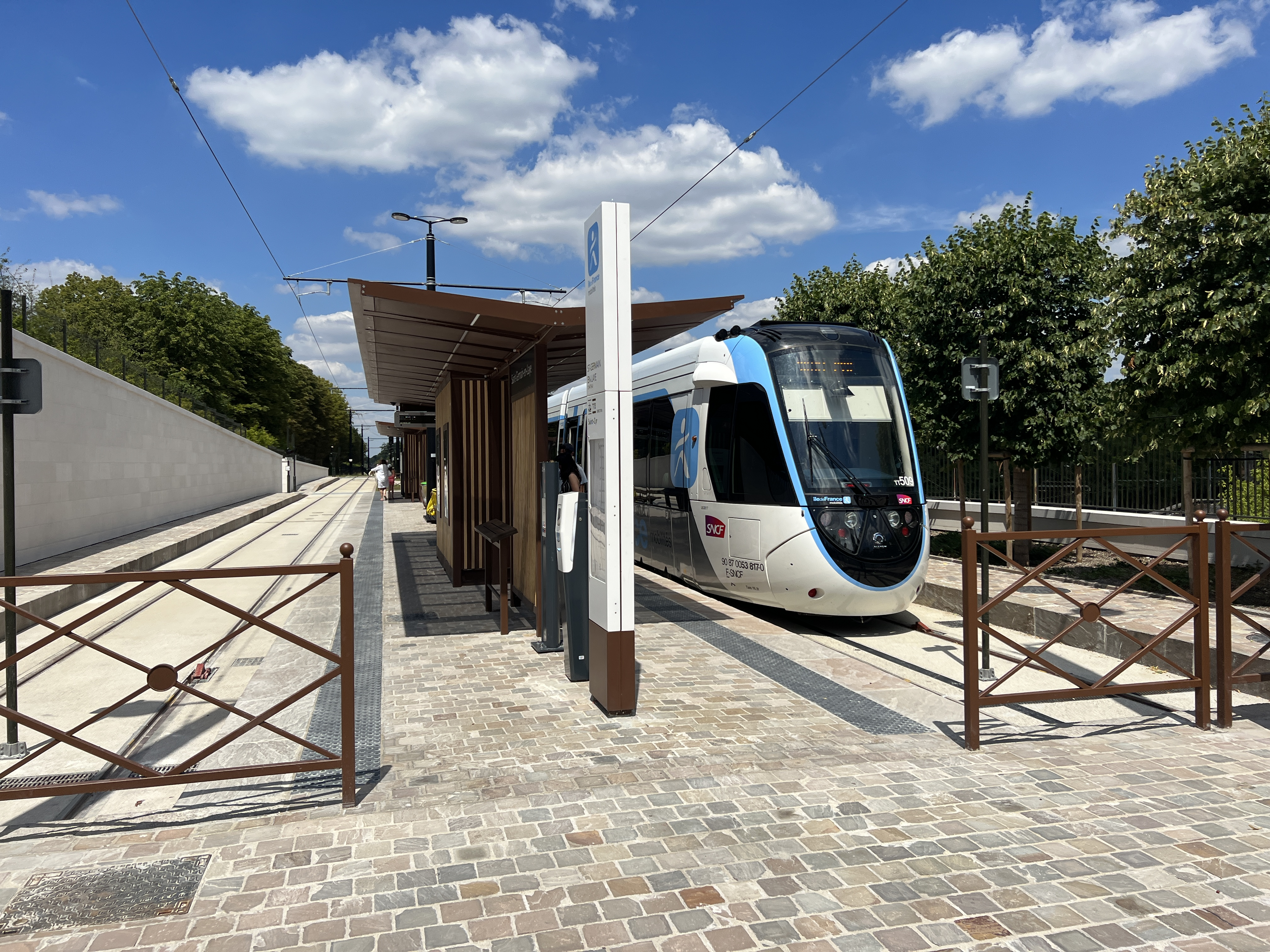
Saint-Germain-en-Laye station

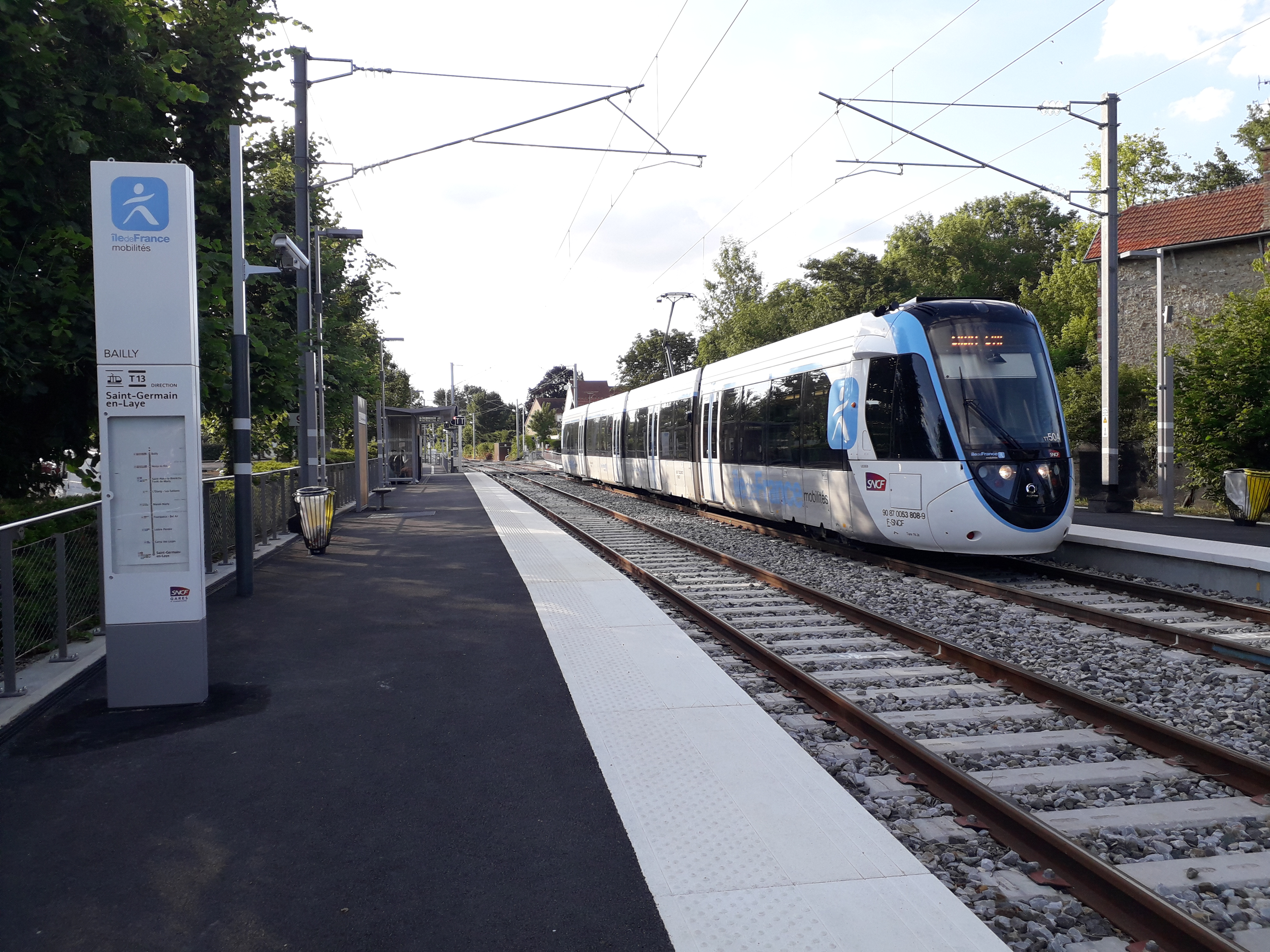
Bailly station

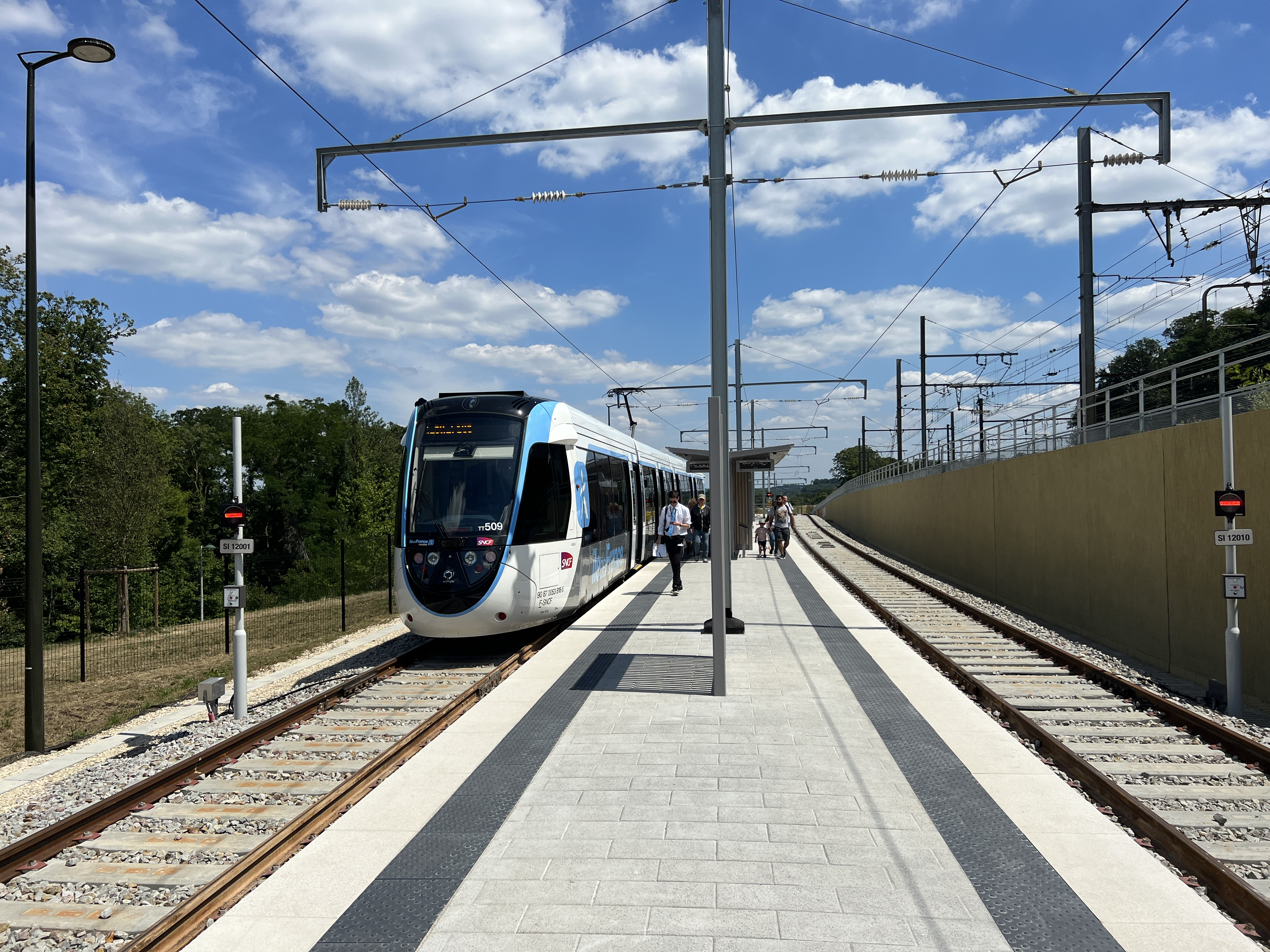
Saint-Cyr station

== Rolling stock ==
Alstom Citadis Dualis tram-trains are used on the line. They are 42 meters long and can accommodate up to 95 seated passengers with up to 155 standing. They are capable of speeds up to 100 km/h.

In 2026, Île-de-France Mobilités ordered 15 CAF Urbos tram-trains. These units are based on the tram platform. These 75-percent, low-floor trams will be 42 metres (138 ft) long and 2.65 metres (8 ft 8 in) wide, and will accommodate up to 86 seated passengers with up to 170 standing. These trams will allow increased train frequency during peak periods, and will also support the planned extension of the line to Achères.

== Extension ==
An extension to Achères-Ville RER station is planned to open by 2028. The line will branch off at Lisière Pereire with a route via Poissy RER station.

== See also ==
- Grande Ceinture line
- Chemin de fer de Petite Ceinture
- Grande ceinture Ouest
