= Grande Ceinture line =

Paris railway loop

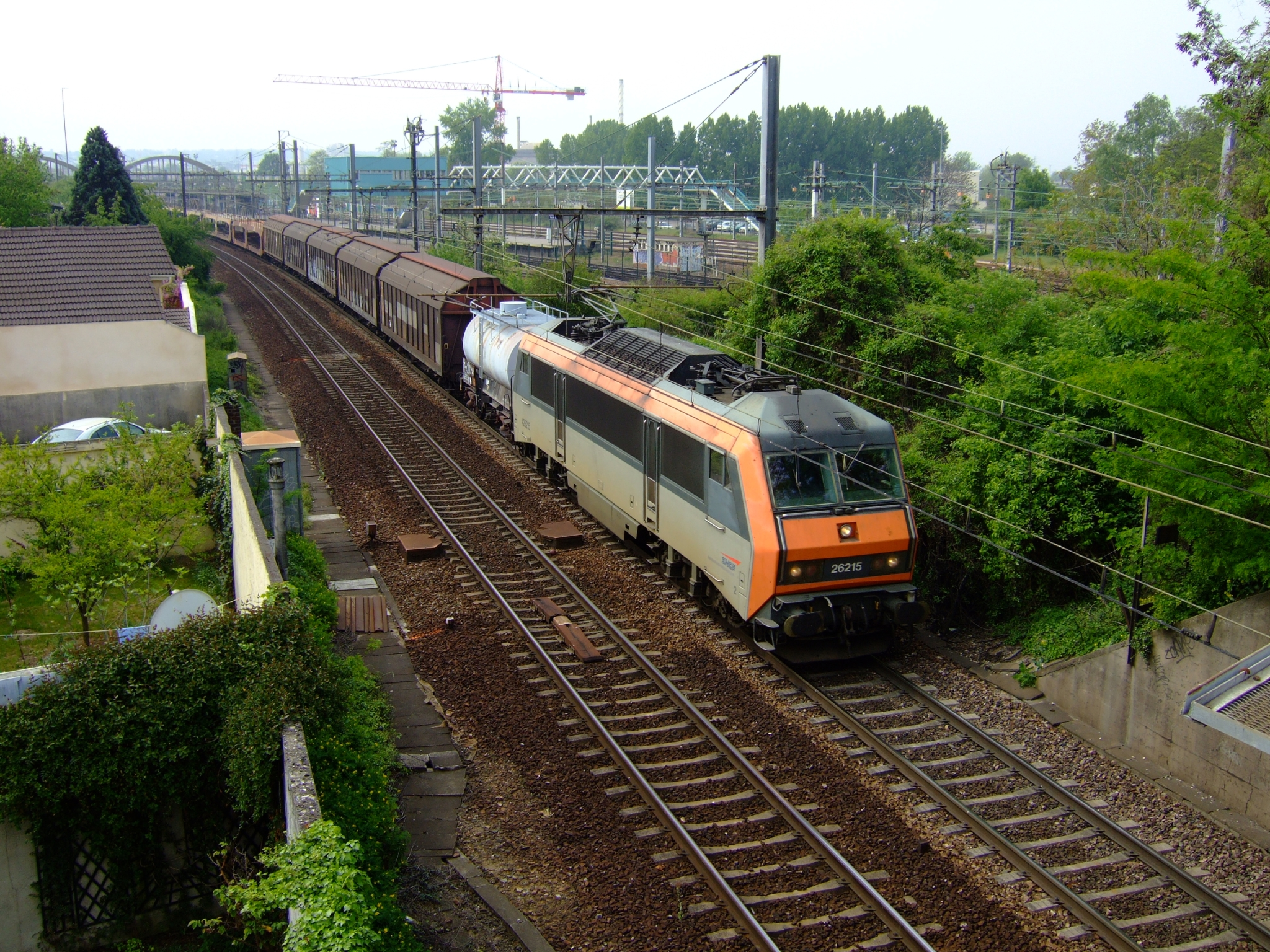
- A train travels on the line near Sucy-en-Brie

Overview
- Native name: Ligne de Grande Ceinture
- Owner: SNCF
- Locale: Île-de-France

Service
- Type: Heavy rail
- Route number: 990 000

History
- Work began: 1875
- Opened: 1877
- Completed: 1886

Technical
- Line length: 157 km (98 mi)
- Num of tracks: 2
- Track gauge: 1,435 mm (4 ft 8 1/2 in) standard gauge
- Electrification: Overhead line: 1,500 V DC (Sucy-Bonneuil – Versailles-Matelots); 25 kV 50 Hz AC (Versailles-Matelots–Saint-Germain-en-Laye and Achères–Sucy-Bonneuil)
Route map
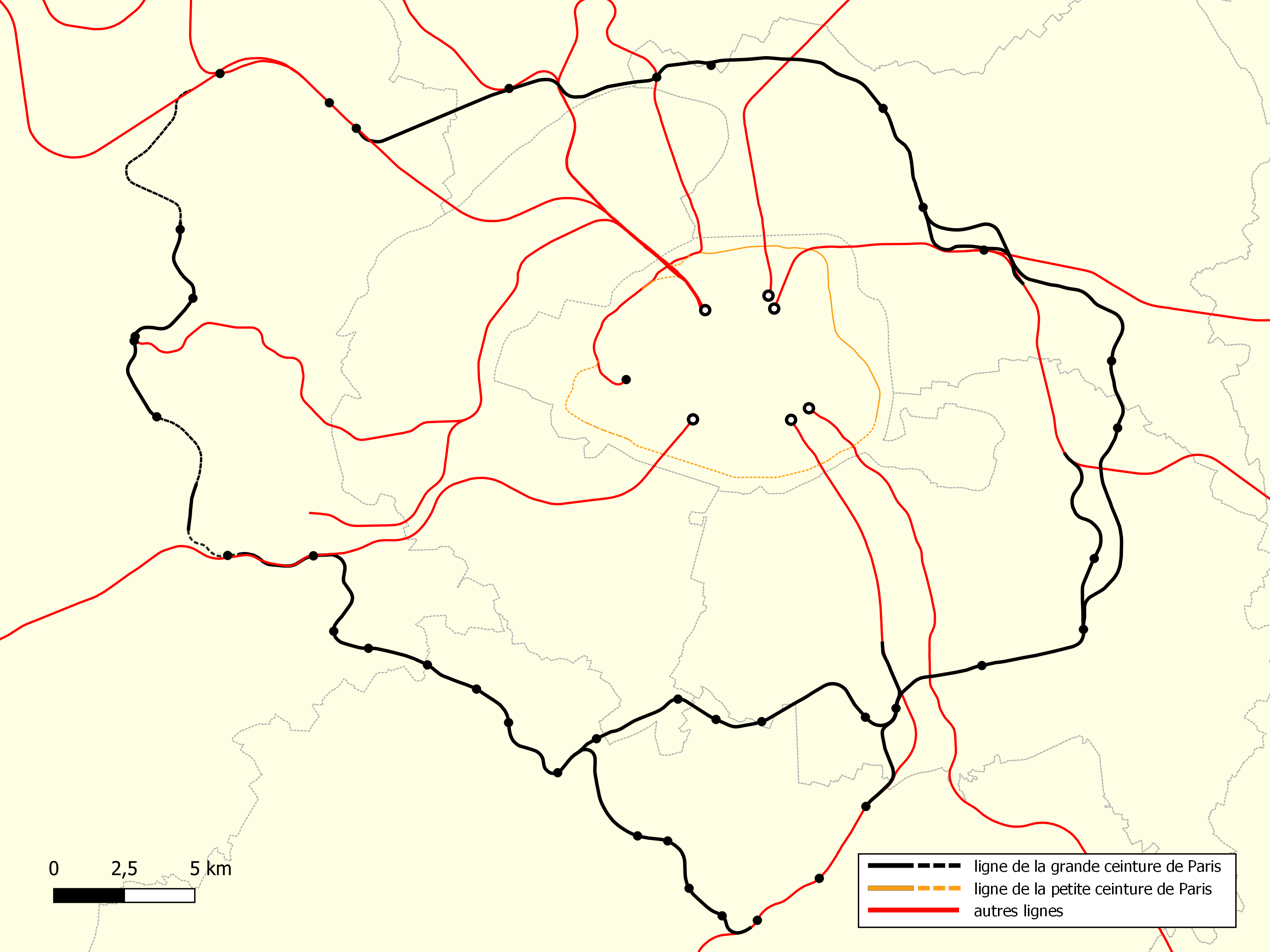

The Grande Ceinture line (French: Ligne de Grande Ceinture, English: Big Belt Line) is a railway line around Paris, located 15 kilometres (9.3 mi) from the Boulevard Périphérique. The decision to build it was taken at the end of the 19th century, to connect the radial lines linking the capital to the provinces and provide relief to the busy Petite Ceinture Line (English: Small Belt Line).

== Description ==
The Grande Ceinture is now entirely dedicated to freight traffic in its northern and eastern section between Sartrouville and Villeneuve-Saint-Georges, linking up the western (Normandy), northern (Picardie, Benelux, Great Britain), east (Lorraine, Alsace, Germany) and south-eastern and south-western routes and their extensions into Italy, Switzerland and Spain, and the connections between the different factories of Île-de-France. It linked up the marshalling yards of Achères, Villeneuve-Saint-Georges and Bourget until the closure of the first two of these in 2005–2006. Intense traffic (more than 200 trains a day) on certain sections, notably in Seine-Saint-Denis, are at saturation level.

To the west, a short section, between Sartrouville and Achères, is used in common with the Paris-Rouen line, and with one of the branches of RER A.

The southern section, between Versailles-Chantiers and Juvisy is also used by suburban trains (RER C) and TGV services (Le Havre-Rouen-Lyon-Marseille link).

Only the Achères-Versailles section is out of use; it was partially reopened to passenger traffic on 12 December 2004 on the Saint-Germain-en-Laye-Noisy-le-Roi section (projet GCO). Further development has seen the section from St Cyr L'École to Saint Germain reopen with a tram-train service starting in 2022. Phase 2 of this project will see the extension of the tram-train to Achères.

== History ==
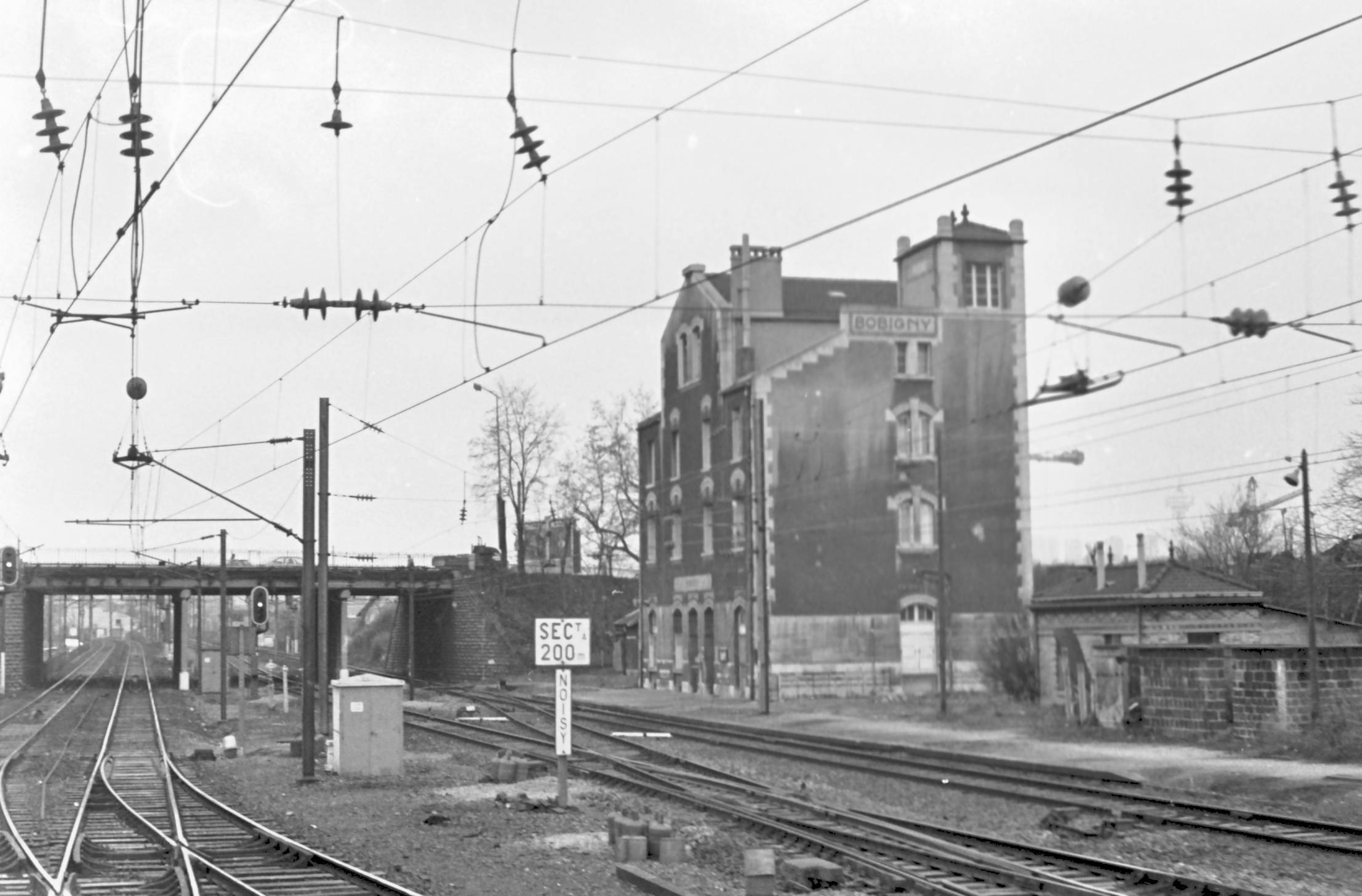
Bobigny station in 1984

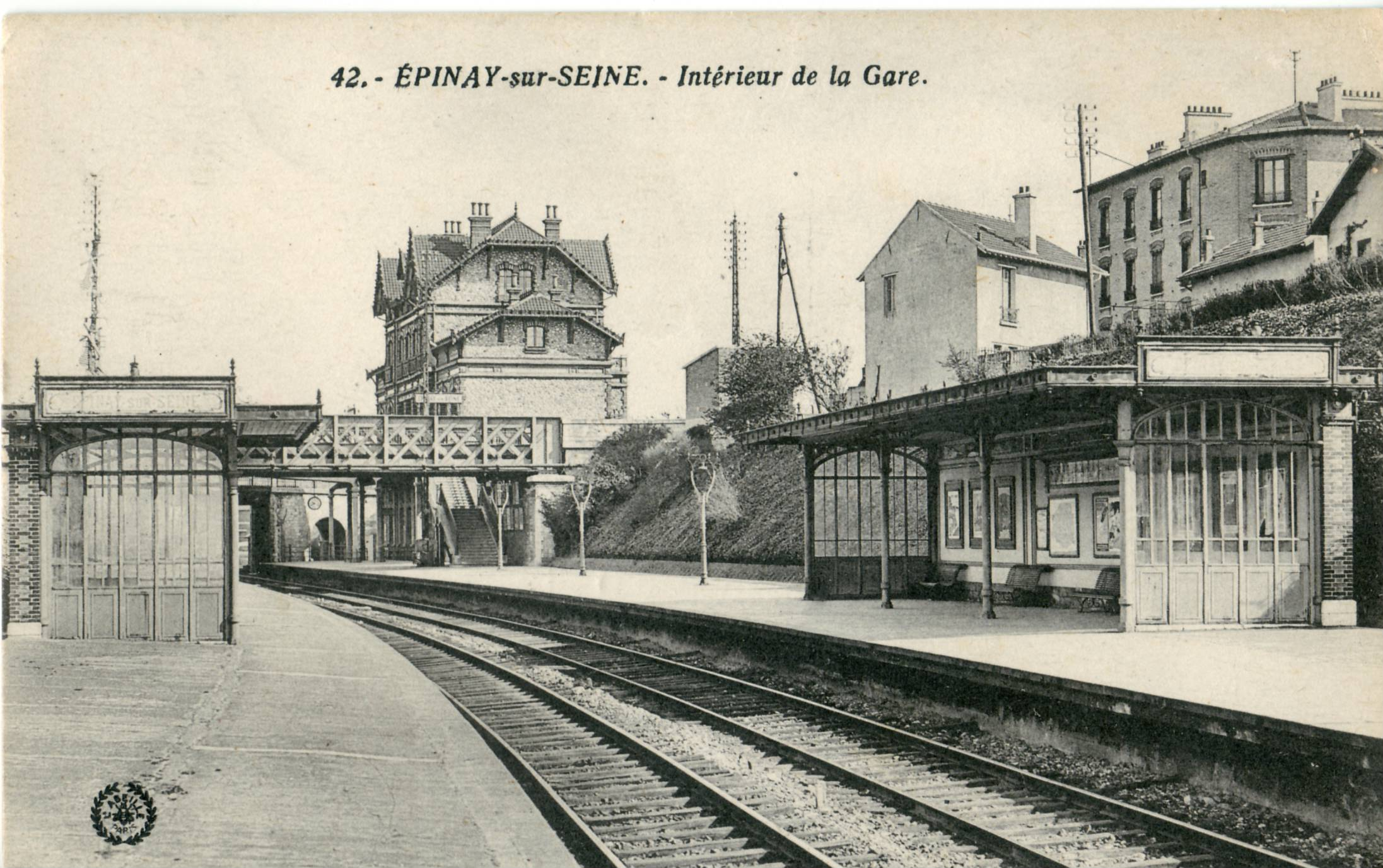
The gare d'Épinay-sur-Seine on the Ligne des Grésillons (now RER line C). The Grande Ceinture passes on the second bridge.

=== Construction ===
Decided upon in 1875, the Grande Ceinture opened in 1877 between Noisy-le-Sec and Villeneuve-Saint-Georges. On 16 July, a passenger service was put in place between gare de l'Est and gare d'Austerlitz.

In 1882, the section between Noisy-le-Sec, Le Bourget and Achères was inaugurated. A station was built at Saint-Germain-en-Laye.

In 1883, the section between Juvisy and Versailles was opened, then in 1886 that between Villeneuve-Saint-Georges and Massy-Palaiseau. This last section was demanded by the army.

In 1939, most of the Grande Ceinture closed to passenger traffic, which was left with only the Versailles - Massy-Palaiseau - Juvisy-sur-Orge section. The line thus became principally mercantile in traffic.

Passenger traffic between Orly and Pont-de-Rungis reopened in 1969, then that between Pont-de-Rungis and Massy-Palaiseau in 1977. On 30 September 1979, this latter section was integrated into RER C.

Between 2005 and the end of 2006 the marshalling yards of Achères and Villeneuve-Saint-Georges closed; the Grande Ceinture thus no longer links the marshalling yard at Le Bourget to the radial lines.

==== Grande ceinture complémentaire ====
In 1924 it was decided to create the "Grande Ceinture complémentaire" between Noisy-le-Sec and Sucy-Bonneuil. This line opened in 1928 for freight and in 1932 for passenger traffic. The section between Bobigny and Sucy-Bonneuil was built later.

=== Exploitation by the Syndicat ===
==== Deserted by travellers ====
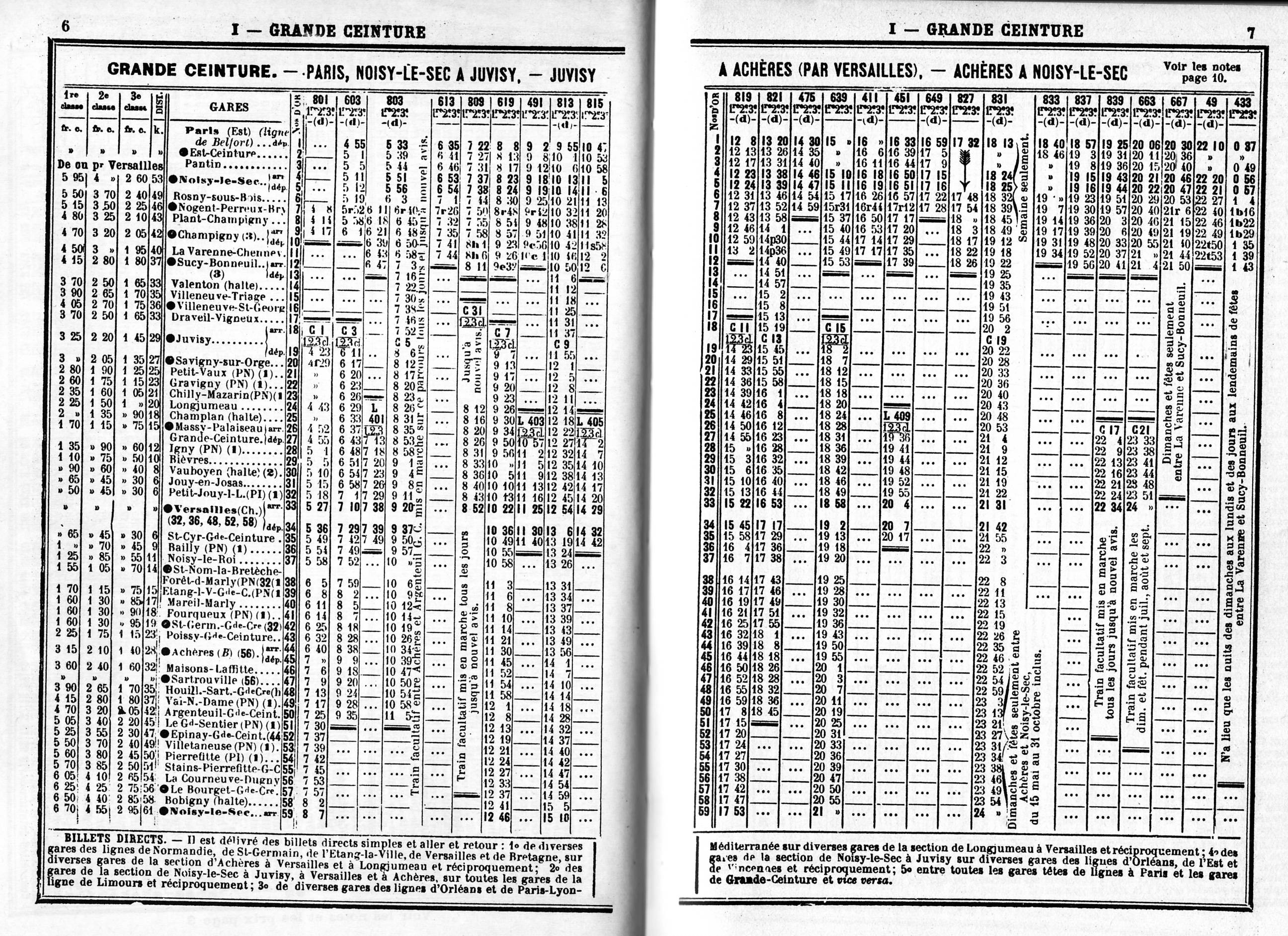
Extract from the May 1914 timetables for passenger services on the Grande Ceinture

The Grande Ceinture's role always erred towards freight rather than passenger transportation. As one can see on the timetables in May 1914, the number of passenger trains of travelers was limited, as was their speed. Running through areas that were then under-urbanised and not linking into the necessary suburban rail-routes, it is thus unsurprising that the Grande Ceinture's passenger service proved unable to withstand the increasing use of cars, buses and other modes of transport.

=== Electrification ===
The desire to introduce large freight trains onto the Grande Ceinture gave rise to the project to electrify its southern section with a continuous current of 1500 Volts. At the end of January 1945, the decision was taken to electrify the Valenton-Juvisy (via Orly) section, and electric services on this section were running as early as September of the same year. In its wake, the Juvisy-Versailles and Orly-Massy sections were also electrified, with electric trains going into service on them on February 6, 1947.

The radial lines at the exit to gare du Nord and gare de l'Est were electrified, running single-phase 25 kV 50 Hz at the end of the 1950s. In this era, electrifying the Grande Ceinture's eastern section became necessary so that freight trains could run along the Ceinture without a break. To this end, the junction section from Stains (Paris-Creil line) to Noisy-le-Sec was switched on as an electric line on 21 July 1959. The Argenteuil-Stains and Bobigny-Gagny sections on the "Complémentaire" were, in their turn, electrified with 25 kV on 14 September 1970.

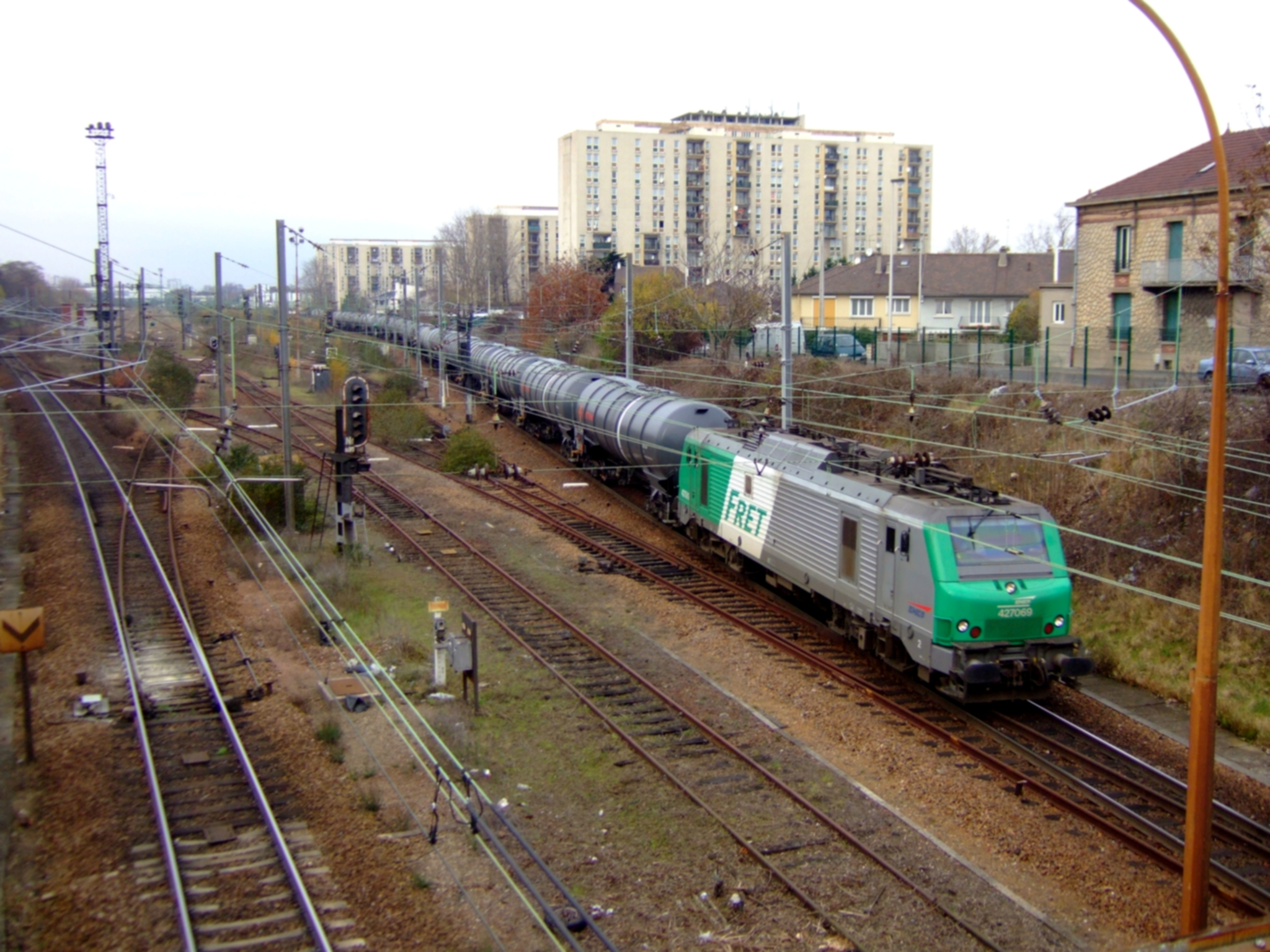
A freight train in the direction of Valenton en route to the sheds at Villemomble, now out of use.

== TGV use ==
From the winter service in 1984 onwards, a new direct TGV link from Lille to Lyon was proposed using the Grande Ceinture Est routes from the junction at Stains to Valenton. Traffic then runs through Noisy-le-Sec but certain trains also loan the "Complémentaire" if there are engineering works or other disruptions. The success of this new scheme led SNCF to offer a second daily round-trip ticket as early as 1985. Until 1986, trains were coupled at Valenton with a new direct Rouen-Lyon service, using the Grande Ceinture Sud, from Versailles-Chantiers to Valenton through Massy-Palaiseau. The TGV Lille-Lyon no longer uses the Grande Ceinture since the opening of the LGV Interconnexion Est in 1994.

=== TGV Normandie-Roissy ===
There are plans to build a TGV link between Normandy and l'aéroport de Roissy, using the LGV Normandie, the Grande Ceinture Nord until Stains, or a new interchange station onto the LGV Nord. This project appeared in the preliminaries of the SDRIF of November 2006.

== Gallery ==
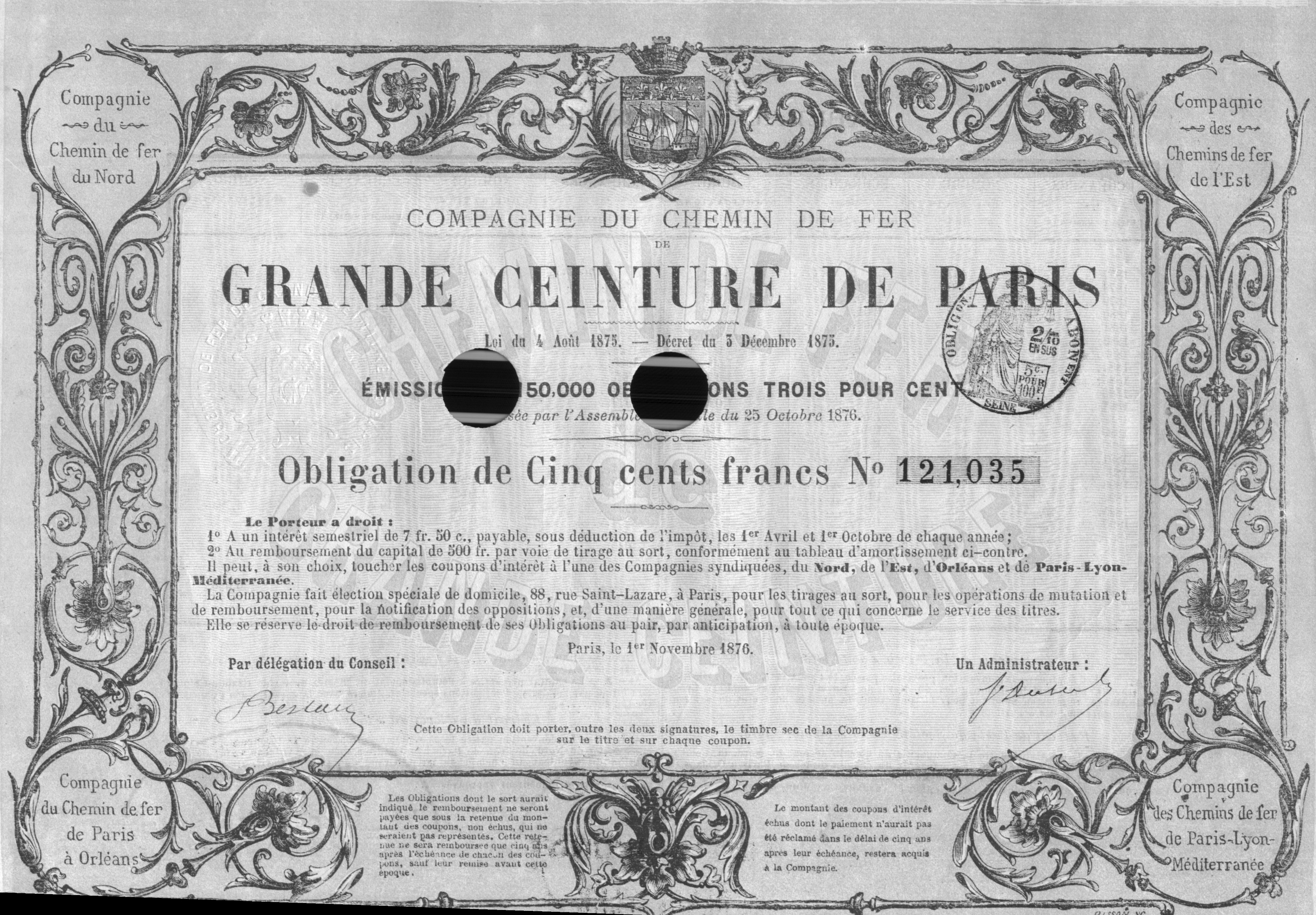
Bond of the Compagnie du chemin de fer de Grande Ceinture, 1876

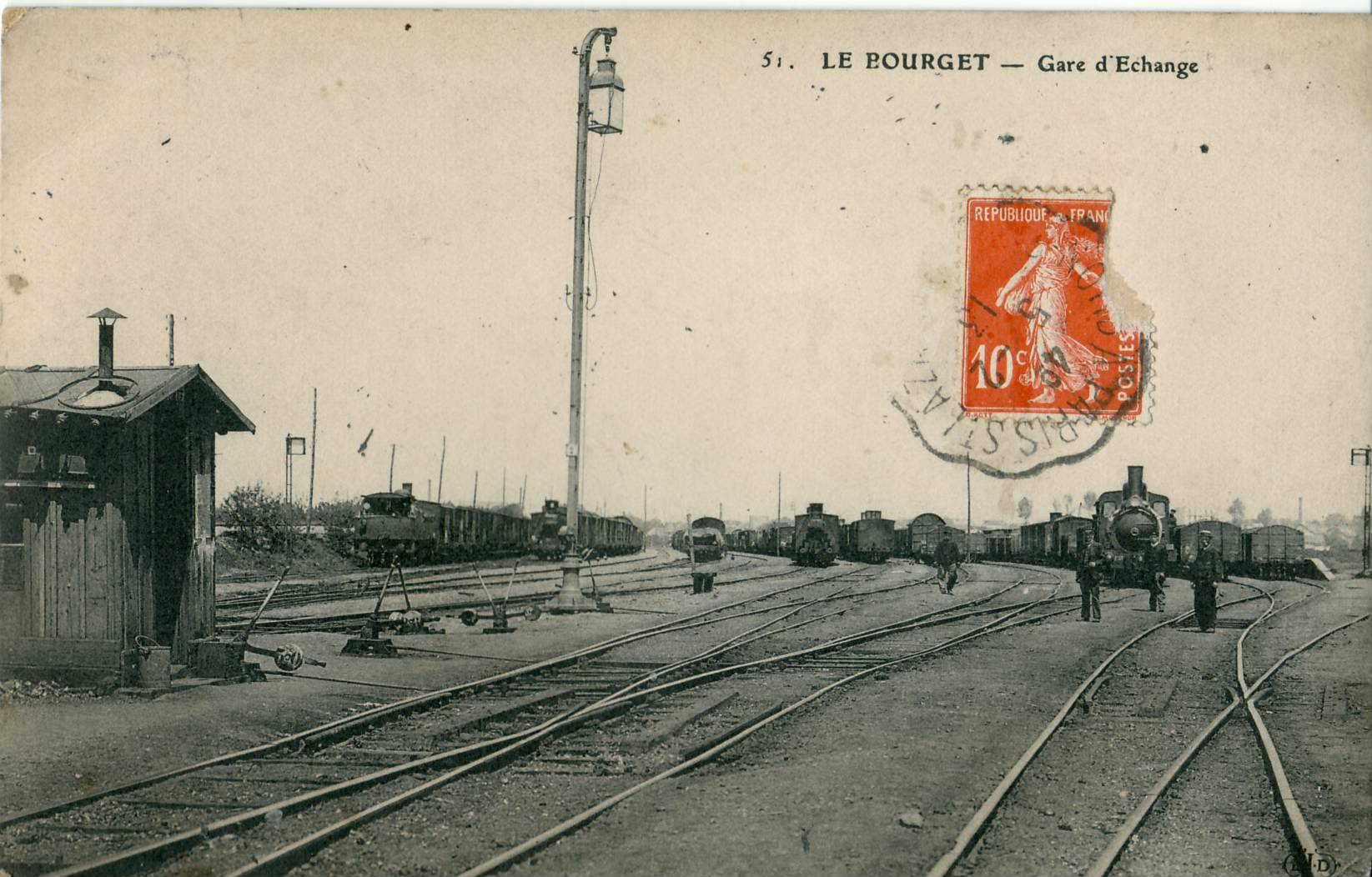
Exchange station at Bourget supplying the marshalling yard at Bourget-Drancy

== See also ==
- Tangentielle Nord
- Tangentielle Ouest
- Tangentielle Sud
- Chemin de fer de Petite Ceinture
- Transilien
- Grande ceinture Ouest
