= Hôpital Antoine-Béclère =

- Assistance publique - Hôpitaux de Paris
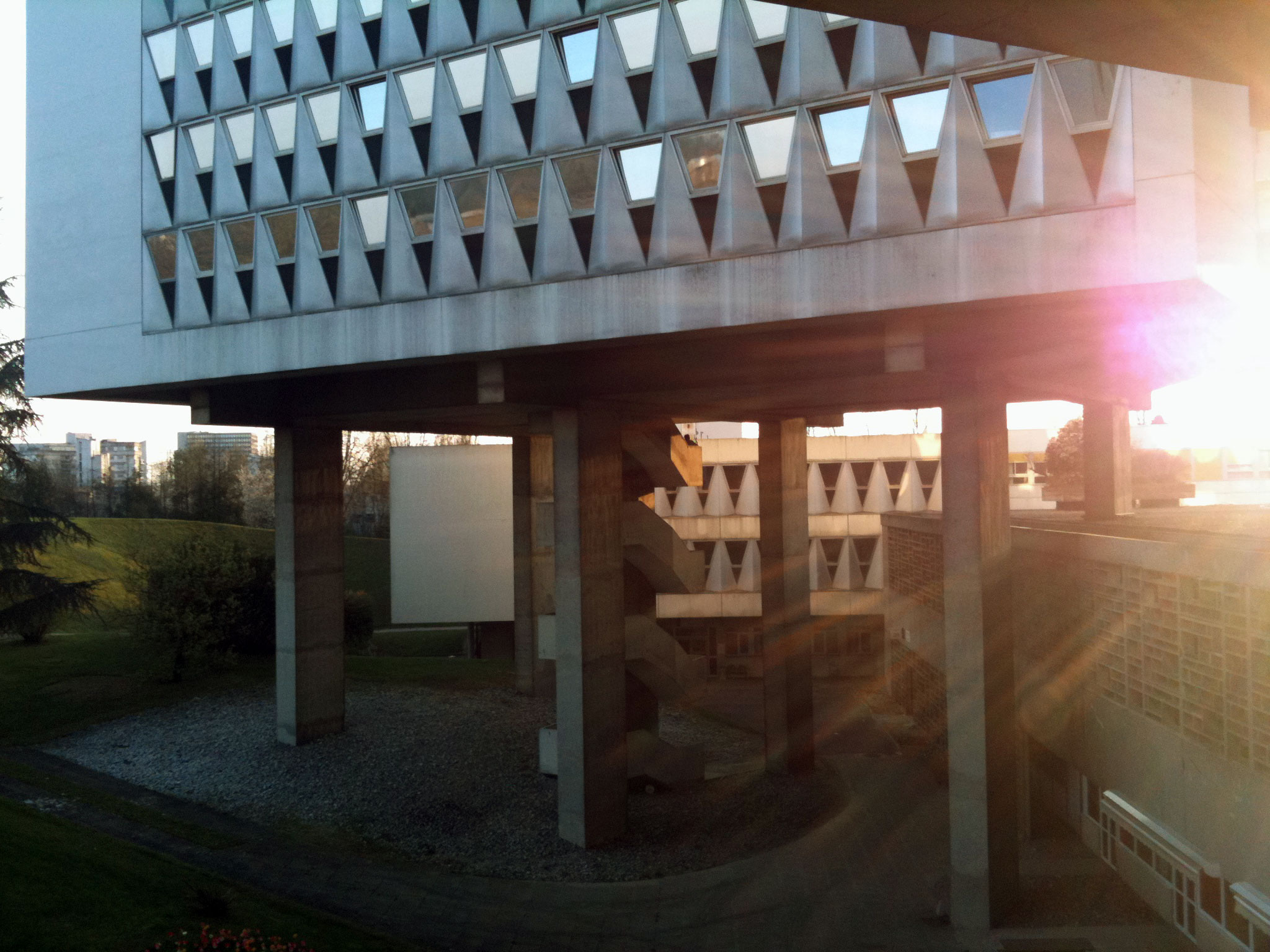
- Hôpital Antoine-Béclère

Geography
- Location: Clamart, Île-de-France, France
- Coordinates: 48°47′19″N 2°15′19″E

Organisation
- Affiliated university: Paris-Saclay University

History
- Opened: 1971

Links
- Website: hopital-antoine-beclere.aphp.fr
- Lists: Hospitals in France

The Hôpital Antoine-Béclère is a public university hospital center (CHU) of the GHU Assistance Publique–Hôpitaux de Paris - Paris-Saclay University, located in Clamart in Hauts-de-Seine, France.

The hospital specializes in pulmonary arterial hypertension, assisted reproduction, metabolic liver disease in children, Willebrand's disease, and sleep disorders.

== History ==
It was in this establishment that the first “test-tube baby” in France, "Amandine", was born on February 24, 1982, thanks to the teams of biologist Jacques Testart and obstetrician-gynecologist René Frydman, as well as the head of department Émile Papiernik.

René Frydman's teams are also at the origin of France's first "baby medicine", Umut-Talha, born on January 26, 2011, in the hospital.
