= Noisy-le-Roi =

- Commune
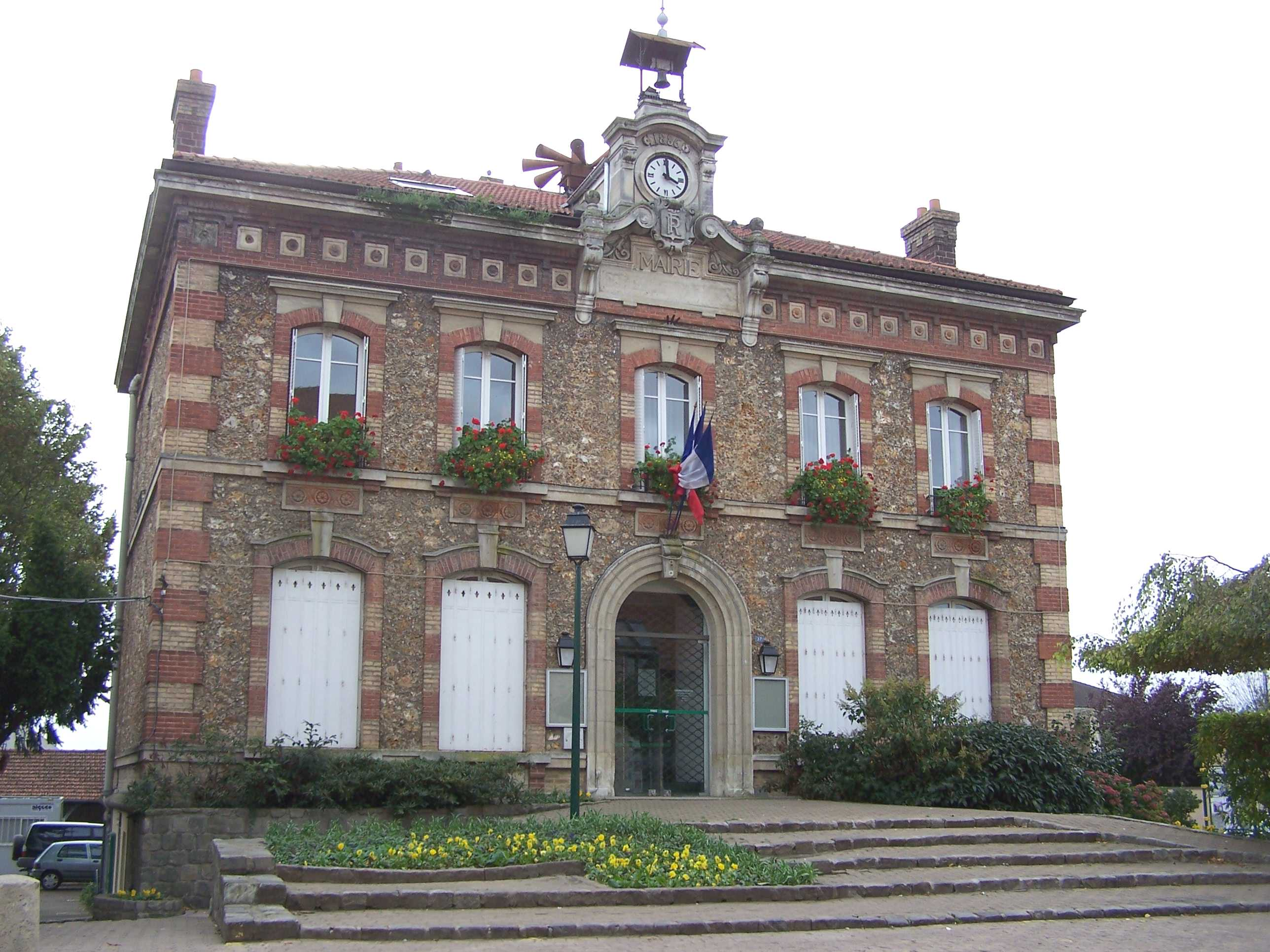
- Town hall

- Coat of arms
- Location of Noisy-le-Roi
- Location within France Location within Île-de-France (region)
- Coordinates: 48°50′49″N 2°03′39″E
- Country: France
- Region: Île-de-France
- Department: Yvelines
- Arrondissement: Versailles
- Canton: Verneuil-sur-Seine
- Intercommunality: CA Versailles Grand Parc

Government
  - Mayor (2020–2026): Marc Tourelle
- Area^{1}: 5.43 km^{2} (2.10 sq mi)
- Elevation: 133 m (436 ft)
- Highest elevation: 182 m (597 ft)
- Lowest elevation: 92 m (302 ft)
- Population (2023): 7,713
  - Density: 1,420/km^{2} (3,680/sq mi)
- Demonym: Noiséens
- Time zone: UTC+01:00 (CET)
  - Summer (DST): UTC+02:00 (CEST)
- INSEE/Postal code: 78455 /78590
- Website: www.noisyleroi.fr
- ^{1} French Land Register data, which excludes lakes, ponds, glaciers > 1 km^{2} (0.386 sq mi or 247 acres) and river estuaries.

Noisy-le-Roi (French pronunciation: [nwazi l(ə) ʁwa]; lit. 'Noisy-the-King') is a commune in the Yvelines department in the Île-de-France region in northern France. It is a wealthy town in the western outer suburbs of Paris. It is part of the Pays des Impressionnistes.

It is served by a stop, Noisy-le-Roi, on Île-de-France tramway Line 13 Express.

== Population ==
Historical population
Year	Pop.	±% p.a.
1968	2,564	—
1975	5,587	+11.77%
1982	5,572	−0.04%
1990	8,095	+4.78%
1999	7,718	−0.53%
2007	8,045	+0.52%
2012	7,721	−0.82%
2017	7,550	−0.45%
2023	7,713	+0.36%
Source: INSEE

== Twin towns ==
Noisy-le-Roi is twinned with:

- (United States) Albion, Michigan, US, since 1998
- Godella, Spain, since 2006

== See also ==
- Communes of the Yvelines department
