= Agglomeration community of Mantes-en-Yvelines =

Mantes-en-Yvelines
- Former communauté d'agglomération
- Interactive map of Mantes-en-Yvelines
- Country: France
- Region: Île-de-France
- Department: Yvelines
- No. of communes: {{{nbcomm}}}
- Established: 1999
- Disbanded: 2016
- Area: 241 km^{2} (93 sq mi)
- Population (2013): 116,487
  - Density: 483/km^{2} (1,250/sq mi)

The Communauté d'agglomération de Mantes-en-Yvelines (or CAMY) is a former administrative entity in the Yvelines département, near Paris. Its administrative center was Mantes-la-Jolie. It was created in December 1999. It was merged into the Communauté urbaine Grand Paris Seine et Oise in January 2016.

== History ==
- At first, the syndicat intercommunal d'assainissement de l'agglomération mantaise was founded in 1951.
- In 1966, it became the District urbain de Mantes (DUM).
- It became a Communauté de communes then, in 1999, a Communauté d'agglomération.
- In 2010, the CAMY adheres at the syndicat mixte Paris Métropole.

== Geography ==
=== Location ===
The Communauté d'agglomération de Mantes-en-Yvelines is located at the south-west of the département of Yvelines, around the Seine river and Mantes-la-Jolie city.

=== Communes ===
The 30 communes of CAMY in 2012

When it was created in 1999, CAMY had 8 communes. In 2004, 2005, 2011, 2012 and 2013, new members joined CAMY which had 35 communes at the time it was disbanded in 2016:

- Arnouville-lès-Mantes (since 2011);
- Auffreville-Brasseuil (since 2011);
- Boinville-en-Mantois (since 2012);
- Breuil-Bois-Robert (since 2011);
- Buchelay;
- Drocourt (since 2005);
- Épône (since 2012);
- La Falaise (since 2012);
- Favrieux (since 2012);
- Flacourt (since 2012);
- Follainville-Dennemont (since 2005);
- Fontenay-Mauvoisin (since 2013);
- Fontenay-Saint-Père (since 2013);
- Gargenville (since 2013);
- Goussonville (since 2012);
- Guernes (since 2013);
- Guerville;
- Hargeville (since 2011);
- Jouy-Mauvoisin (since 2012);
- Jumeauville (since 2012);
- Magnanville;
- Mantes-la-Jolie;
- Mantes-la-Ville;
- Méricourt (since 2004);
- Mézières-sur-Seine (since 2012);
- Mousseaux-sur-Seine (since 2004);
- Perdreauville (since 2012);
- Porcheville;
- Rolleboise;
- Rosny-sur-Seine;
- Sailly (since 2011);
- Saint-Martin-la-Garenne (since 2013);
- Soindres (since 2012);
- Le Tertre-Saint-Denis (since 2012);
- Vert (since 2012).

In 2010, Dominique Braye said that the territory of the CAMY would spread in the coming years. In January 2012, thirteen new towns have made their entry into the agglomération. In 2013, five new towns entered the agglomération: Gargenville, Guernes, Fontenay-Mauvoisin, Fontenay-Saint-Père and Saint-Martin-la-Garenne, bringing the number of communes of CAMY to 35. Note that the second city of the metropolitan area, Limay, 16 005 inhabitants, which is also the most industrialized and do not want to join the CAMY. It should, according to the SDCI Yvelines, join Issou and Guitrancourt, common on the right bank of the Seine, to form a new intercommunalité.

== Education ==
- Versailles Saint-Quentin-en-Yvelines University
