= Boinville-en-Mantois =

- Commune
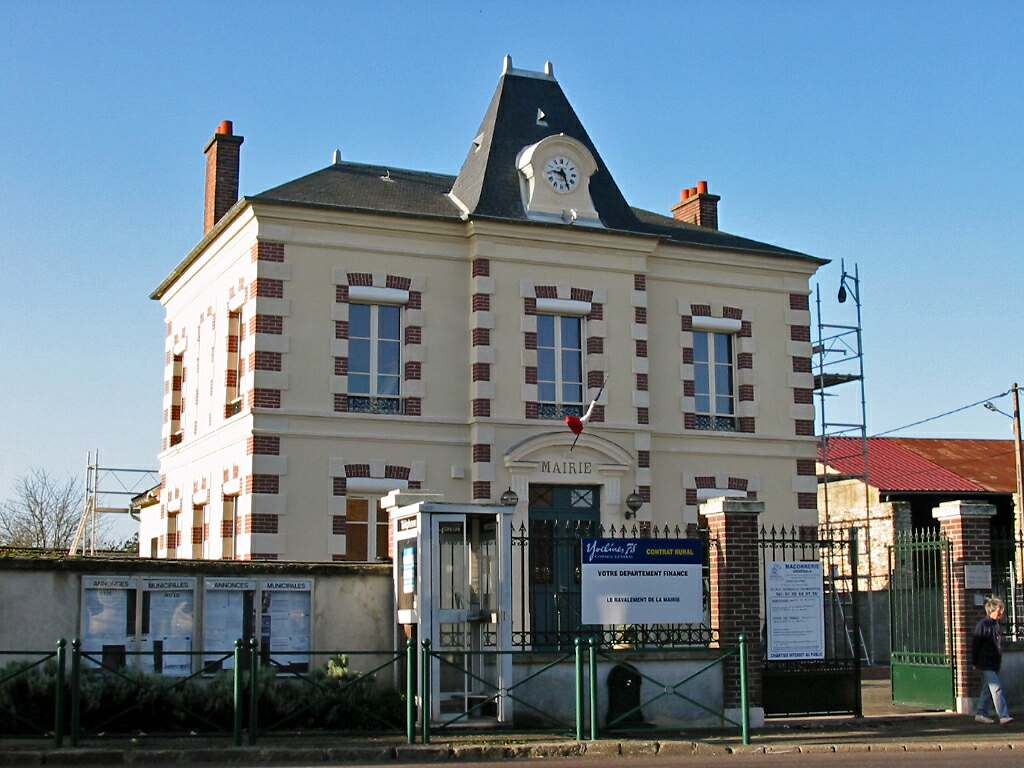
- Town hall
- Location of Boinville-en-Mantois
- Location within France Location within Île-de-France (region)
- Coordinates: 48°55′52″N 1°45′25″E
- Country: France
- Region: Île-de-France
- Department: Yvelines
- Arrondissement: Mantes-la-Jolie
- Canton: Bonnières-sur-Seine
- Intercommunality: CU Grand Paris Seine et Oise

Government
  - Mayor (2020–2026): Daniel Maurey
- Area^{1}: 4.93 km^{2} (1.90 sq mi)
- Elevation: 130 m (430 ft)
- Highest elevation: 145 m (476 ft)
- Lowest elevation: 56 m (184 ft)
- Population (2023): 285
  - Density: 57.8/km^{2} (150/sq mi)
- Time zone: UTC+01:00 (CET)
  - Summer (DST): UTC+02:00 (CEST)
- INSEE/Postal code: 78070 /78930
- ^{1} French Land Register data, which excludes lakes, ponds, glaciers > 1 km^{2} (0.386 sq mi or 247 acres) and river estuaries.

Boinville-en-Mantois (French pronunciation: [bwɛ̃vil ɑ̃ mɑ̃twa]) is a commune in the Yvelines department in north-central France.

== Geography ==
Boinville-en-Mantois is located 8 km south-east of Mantes-la-Jolie in the Mantois (a natural region of France) at an approximate altitude of 135m.

The commune is bordered by Mézières-sur-Seine and Guerville from the north, Goussonville from the east and by Arnouville-lès-Mantes from the south-west.

== See also ==
- Communes of the Yvelines department
