= Épône =

- Commune
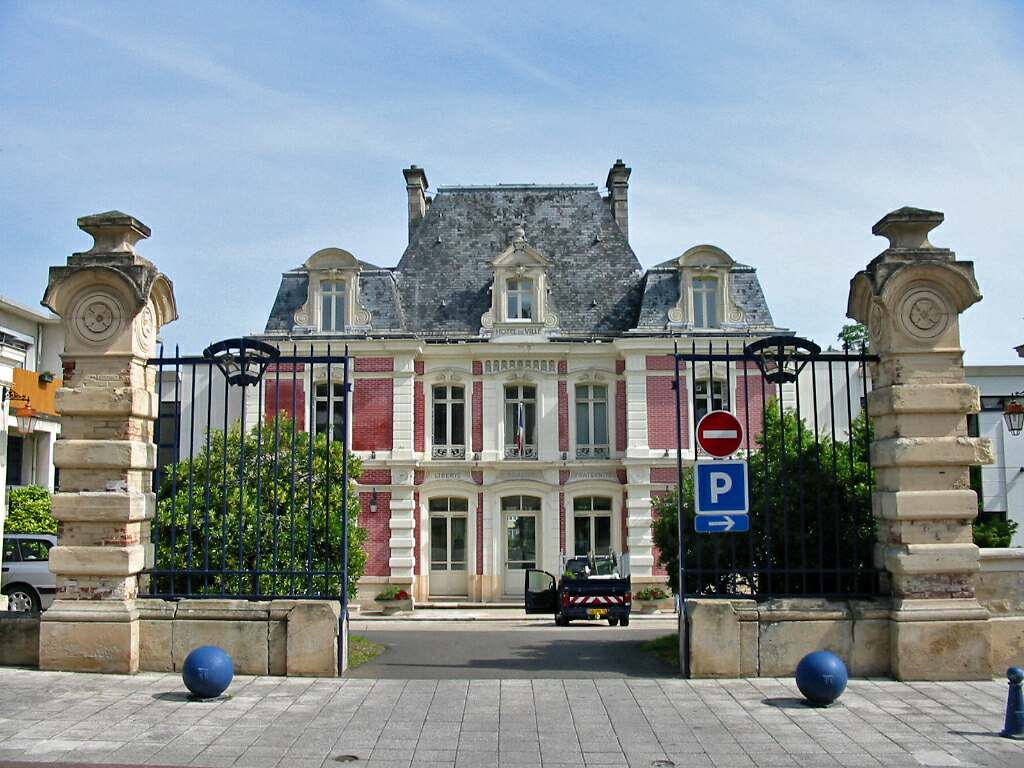
- The town hall in Épône

- Coat of arms
- Location of Épône
- Location within France Location within Île-de-France (region)
- Coordinates: 48°57′23″N 1°48′58″E
- Country: France
- Region: Île-de-France
- Department: Yvelines
- Arrondissement: Mantes-la-Jolie
- Canton: Limay
- Intercommunality: CU Grand Paris Seine et Oise

Government
  - Mayor (2023–2026): Ivica Jovic
- Area^{1}: 12.76 km^{2} (4.93 sq mi)
- Elevation: 57 m (187 ft)
- Highest elevation: 142 m (466 ft)
- Lowest elevation: 17 m (56 ft)
- Population (2023): 7,031
  - Density: 551.0/km^{2} (1,427/sq mi)
- Time zone: UTC+01:00 (CET)
  - Summer (DST): UTC+02:00 (CEST)
- INSEE/Postal code: 78217 /78680
- ^{1} French Land Register data, which excludes lakes, ponds, glaciers > 1 km^{2} (0.386 sq mi or 247 acres) and river estuaries.

Épône (French: [epon]) is a commune in the Yvelines department in the Île-de-France region in north-central France. It is situated on the left bank of the River Seine 40 kilometres (25 mi) west of Paris. Together with Mézières-sur-Seine and La Falaise, it forms a settlement of around 10,000 inhabitants. Its inhabitants are known as Épônois.

The name comes from the Latin Spedona and, according to Daniel Bricon, has no link to Epona the Gaulish goddess of horses and protector of horseriders.

== Geography ==
Situated in the north west of Yvelines at the confluence of the rivers Mauldre and Seine, Épône is located in the Mantois at around 10 kilometres to the east of Mantes-la-Jolie and 36 kilometres north west of Versailles.

The commune is bordered by Gargenville to the north (on the opposite bank of the Seine), Aubergenville and La Falaise to the east, Maule to the south east, Jumeauville and Goussonville to the south west, and Mézières-sur-Seine to the west.

The commune is relatively large, covering 1300 hectares in total. It consists of three main parts.

- The south: limestone plateaus, at an altitude of around 130 metres, mainly used for growing crops. The hamlet of Vélannes is also found here.
- The north: the river valley at an altitude of around 20 metres, used for agriculture, and transport links, as well as housing around the railway.
- Centre: the old town, situated on the hillside around the tenth century church.

=== Climate ===
Épône has a temperate climate of oceanic type that is typical of the Ile-de-France region. The average temperatures vary between 2-5 °C in January to 14-25 °C in July. Annual rainfall is relatively low at around 600 millimetres per year, with October to January the rainiest months.

=== Land usage ===
Use	Percentage	Area (hectares)
Built-up urban space	20%	261.35
Unbuilt urban space	7%	88.29
Rural space	74%	983.51

The majority of the commune is essentially rural (74%), with urban space accounting for around 20% of the total.

The town area falls into three main groups; the old walled town, the Vélannes hamlet and the Élisabethville area in the alluvial plain. The urban area is more developed at the eastern end of the commune at the edge of the hamlet of Villeneuve (Mézières), and an additional hamlet of around a dozen homes in the area known as "Canada" at the southern end.

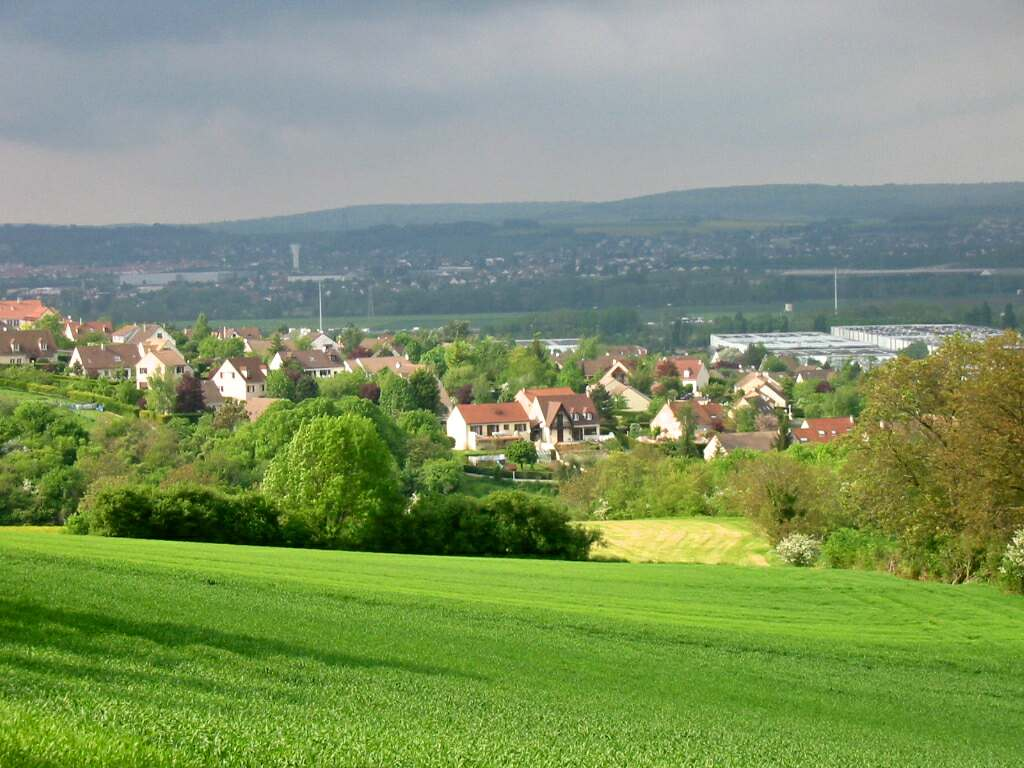
Les Grands Champs

Épône includes a part (1500 out of the 4000 inhabitants) of the "garden city" of Élisabethville. Created in the 1920s and named after the then queen of Belgium, the area became popular among Parisians looking to escape the city during the années folles for its beach on the banks of the Seine, its casino and 18-hole golf course. It retains one of the first churches built from reinforced concrete, built in 1928 by the architect Paul Tournon and dedicated to Saint Theresa.

The majority of the houses (~75%) are detached, but there are also around 600 homes in collective housing in the town centre, mainly council housing from the 1960s to accommodate employees of the Renault factory.

Economic activity centres around the railway station in an industrial zone bordering the motorway and the RD133 road.

Rural land is principally given to agriculture, with wooded land occupying an additional 20% (primarily the Lourdet and Étibot woods in the south of the commune). There is also a small lake in the Seine valley near Élisabethville on the site of a former gravel pit now converted to a nature reserve.

== Population ==
Historical population
Year	Pop.	±% p.a.
1968	3,865	—
1975	5,008	+3.77%
1982	5,233	+0.63%
1990	6,706	+3.15%
1999	6,418	−0.49%
2007	6,345	−0.14%
2012	6,467	+0.38%
2017	6,503	+0.11%
2023	7,031	+1.31%
Source: INSEE

== Culture ==
=== People linked with Épône ===
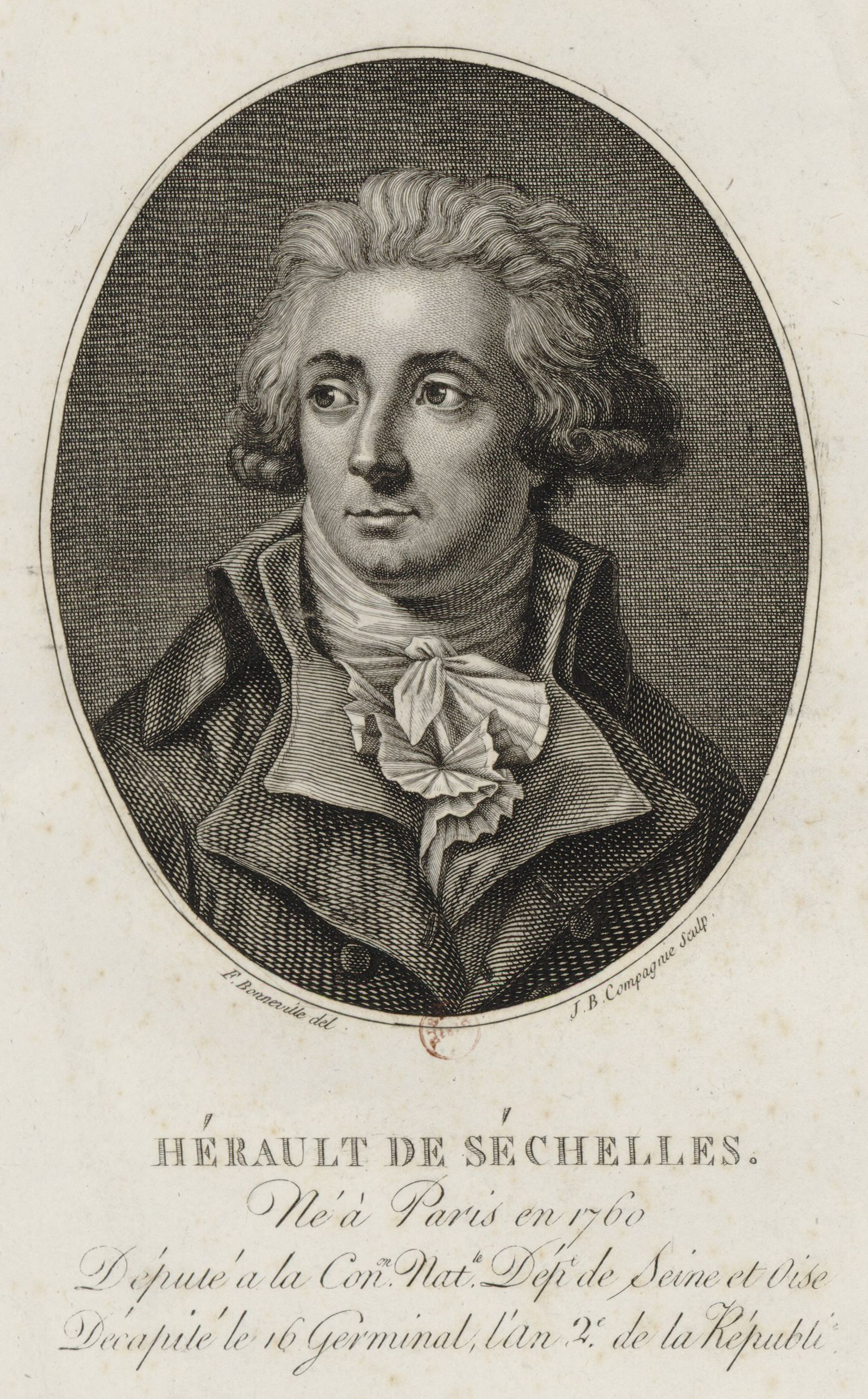
Marie-Jean Hérault de Séchelles

- Hérault de Séchelles (1759–1794), former lord of Épône, representative of Seine-et-Oise in the National Convention, beheaded in 1794, and author of Théorie de l'ambition, codicille politique pratique d’un jeune habitant d’Épône
- Alphonse Durand (1814–1882), architect. Died in Épône on August 4, 1882.
- Émile Sergent (1867–1943), professor of medicine, president of the Académie de médecine and director of Boucicaut Hospital, Paris during the Second World War.
- Max Brusset (1909–1992), politician (mayor of Royan).
- Daniel Bricon (1928–2004), teacher and historian, author of a history of Épône (1982);
- Dominique de Roux (1935–1977), writer and journalist. Worked at the château d'Épône owned by her father-in-law, Max Brusset;
- Pierre Amouroux (1937–2009), conseiller général of Yvelines, mayor of Épône between 1977 and 2004, and MP between 2004 and 2007.

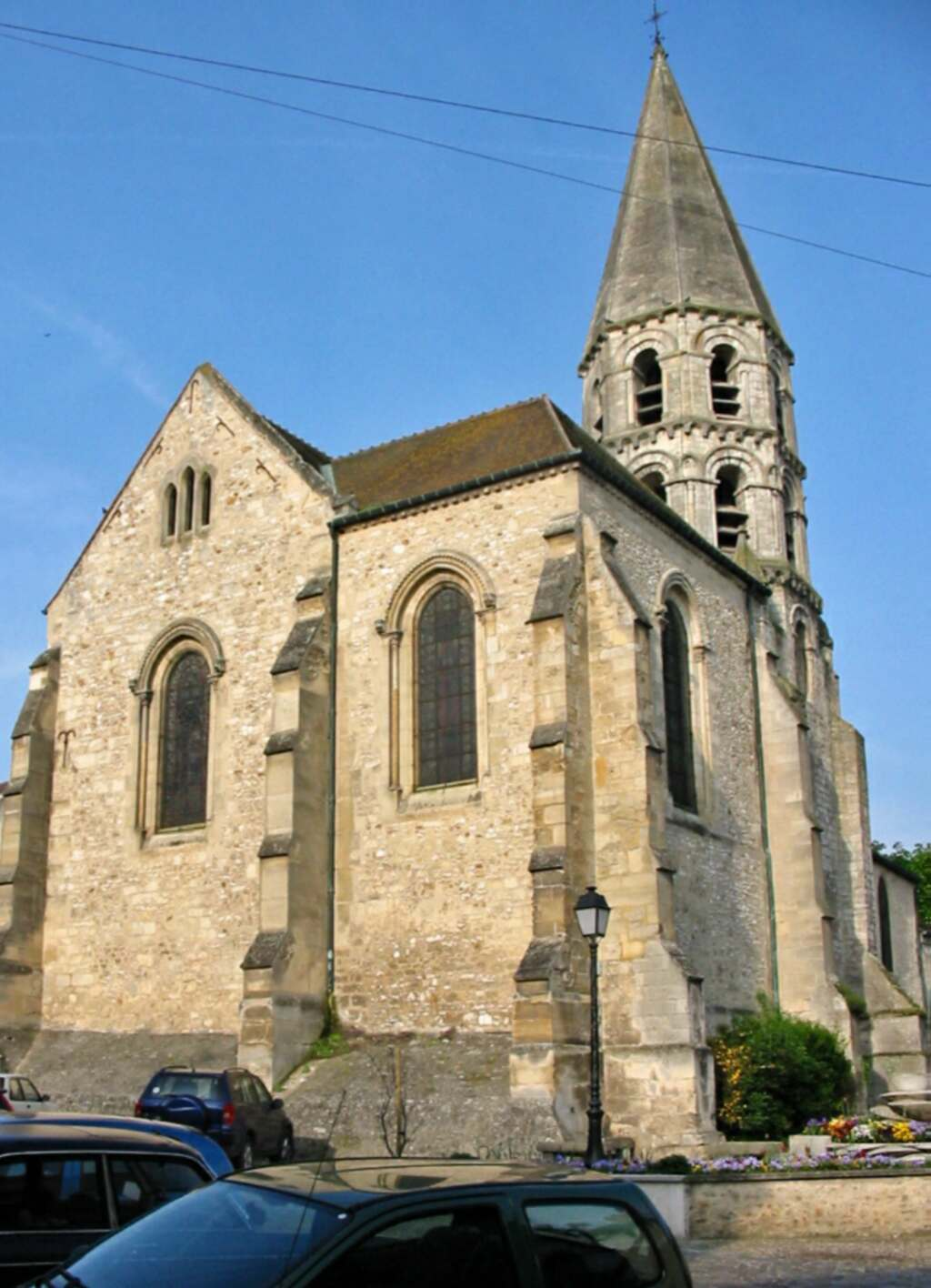
Saint-Béat

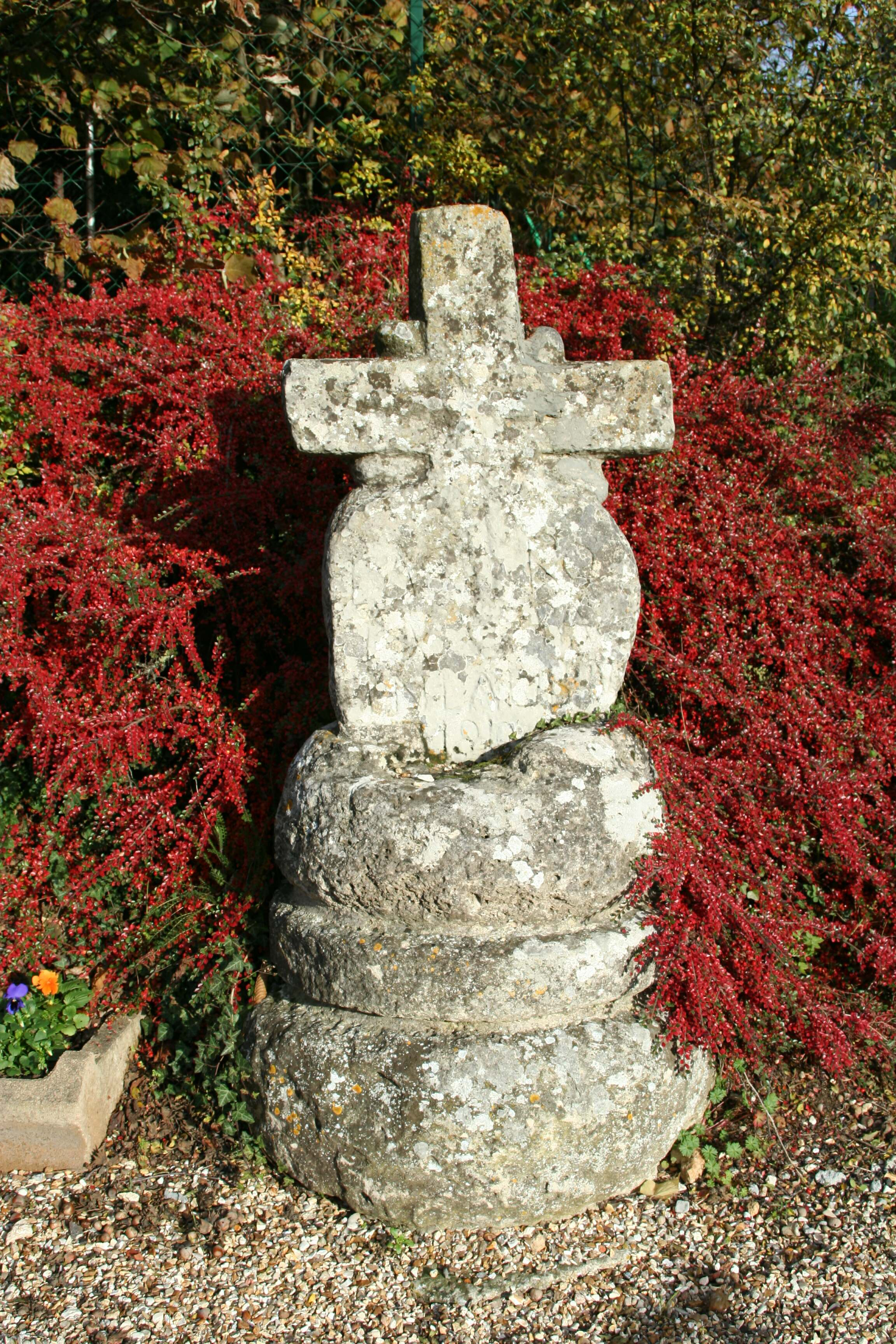
Cross of Saint-Aubin

=== Twin towns ===
- "Sponsorship" of Doïna-Girov, Romania organised by "Les Amis de Doïna Girov" to provide humanitarian help to the Romanian village.
- Prokuplje

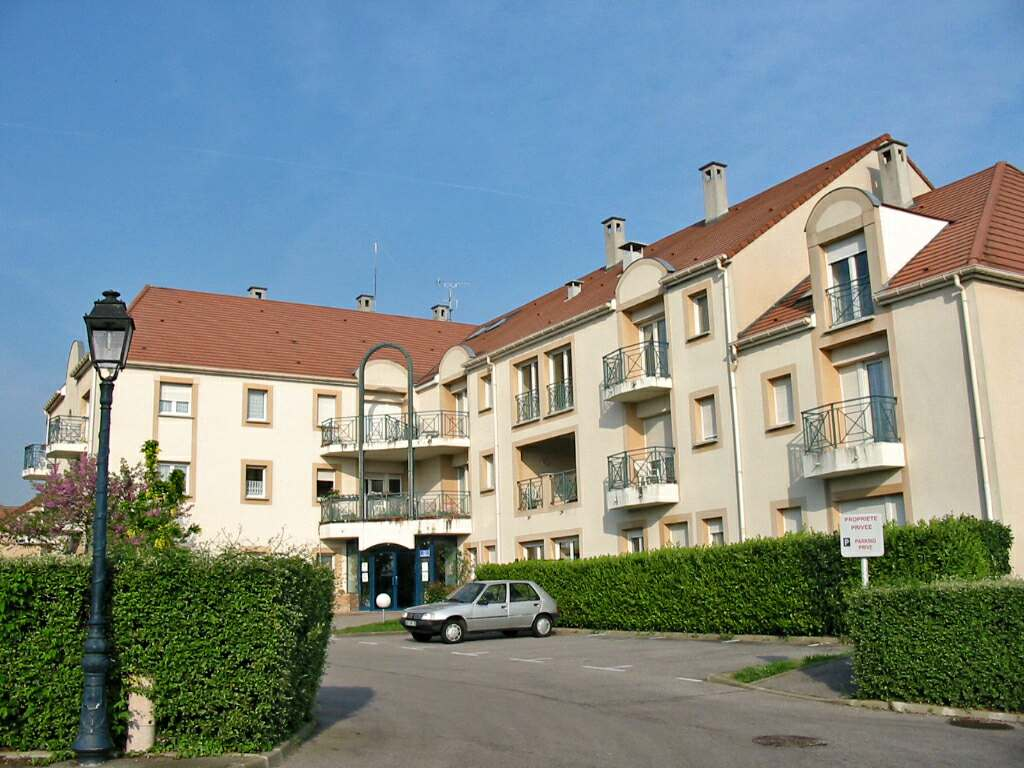
Les Cytises, retirement home

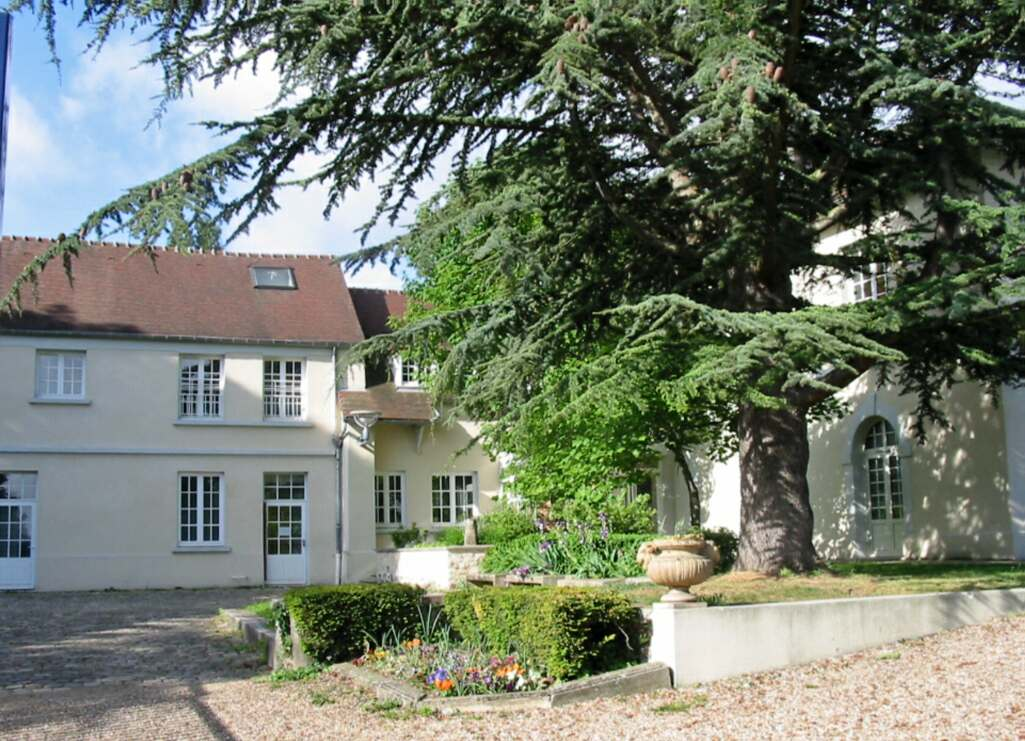
Dominique de Roux cultural centre

=== Education ===
- Schools :
  - Three nursery schools: Les Pervenches, Les Lavandes, Les Perce-Neiges (Élisabethville),
  - Three primary schools: Jean de la Fontaine, Blaise Pascal, Louis Pasteur (Élisabethville).
  - Secondary school: Benjamin Franklin (opened 1982), home to 600 pupils from neighbouring communes Épône, Mézières-sur-Seine and La Falaise. Its name is derived from the fact that Franklin stayed in Épône when he was Ambassador in France.

Pupils usually then move to the Vincent van Gogh lycée at Aubergenville.

== See also ==
- Communes of the Yvelines department

== Bibliography ==
- Bardy Monique, La grande histoire des Yvelines, Édijac, 1989, ISBN 2-904625-25-6.
- Bricon Daniel, Épône raconté aux Épônois, histoire d'une petite ville de l'ouest parisien, Édition ville d'Épône, 2002 (2nd edition), ISBN 2-904417-01-X.
- Lachiver Marcel, Histoire de Mantes et du Mantois à travers chroniques et mémoires des origines à 1792, Meulan, 1971.
- Monographie de la commune d'Épône, Archives départementale des Yvelines, 1899.
- Mantes et son arrondissement, Victor Bourselet et Henri Clérisse, distribution : Société française du Livre, Mantes, 1933.
- L'église Saint-Béat d'Épône, Centre de recherches archéologiques de la région mantaise, special bulletin, 2007.
