= Méricourt =

Méricourt is the name of several communes in France:

- Méricourt, Pas-de-Calais
- Méricourt, Yvelines
- Méricourt-en-Vimeu, in the Somme département
- Méricourt-l'Abbé, in the Somme département
- Méricourt-sur-Somme, in the Somme département
