= Mantes (disambiguation) =

Mantes may refer to

- Mantes, a synonym for a genus of insects, Mantis (genus)
- Mantes-la-Jolie, a commune in Yvelines, France
- Mantes-la-Ville, a commune in the Yvelines, France
- Mantes-en-Yvelines, a former communauté d'agglomération comprising both the above
