= Drocourt =

Drocourt is the name of several communes in France:

- Drocourt, Pas-de-Calais
- Drocourt, Yvelines
