= Montalet-le-Bois =

- Commune
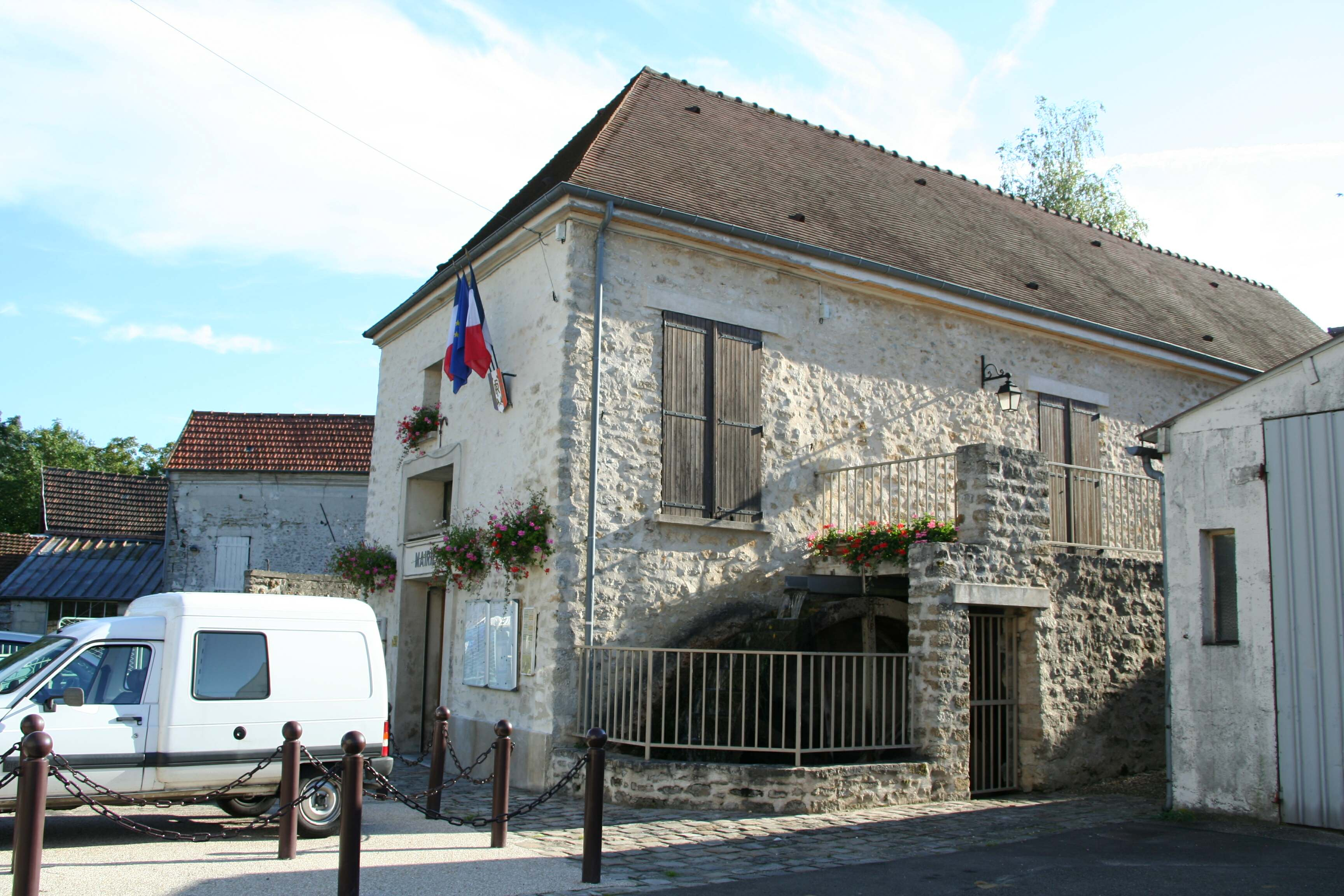
- The town hall in Montalet-le-Bois, located in the old mill

- Coat of arms
- Location of Montalet-le-Bois
- Location within France Location within Île-de-France (region)
- Coordinates: 49°02′50″N 1°49′36″E
- Country: France
- Region: Île-de-France
- Department: Yvelines
- Arrondissement: Mantes-la-Jolie
- Canton: Limay
- Intercommunality: CU Grand Paris Seine et Oise

Government
  - Mayor (2021–2026): Maël Wotin
- Area^{1}: 3.01 km^{2} (1.16 sq mi)
- Elevation: 128 m (420 ft)
- Highest elevation: 180 m (590 ft)
- Lowest elevation: 66 m (217 ft)
- Population (2023): 322
  - Density: 107/km^{2} (277/sq mi)
- Time zone: UTC+01:00 (CET)
  - Summer (DST): UTC+02:00 (CEST)
- INSEE/Postal code: 78416 /78440
- ^{1} French Land Register data, which excludes lakes, ponds, glaciers > 1 km^{2} (0.386 sq mi or 247 acres) and river estuaries.

Montalet-le-Bois (French pronunciation: [mɔ̃talɛ lə bwa]) is a commune in the Yvelines department in the Île-de-France region in north-central France.

== See also ==
- Communes of the Yvelines department
