= Arrondissement of Mantes-la-Jolie =

Coordinates: 48°59′57″N 1°41′41″E

Mantes-la-Jolie
- Arrondissement
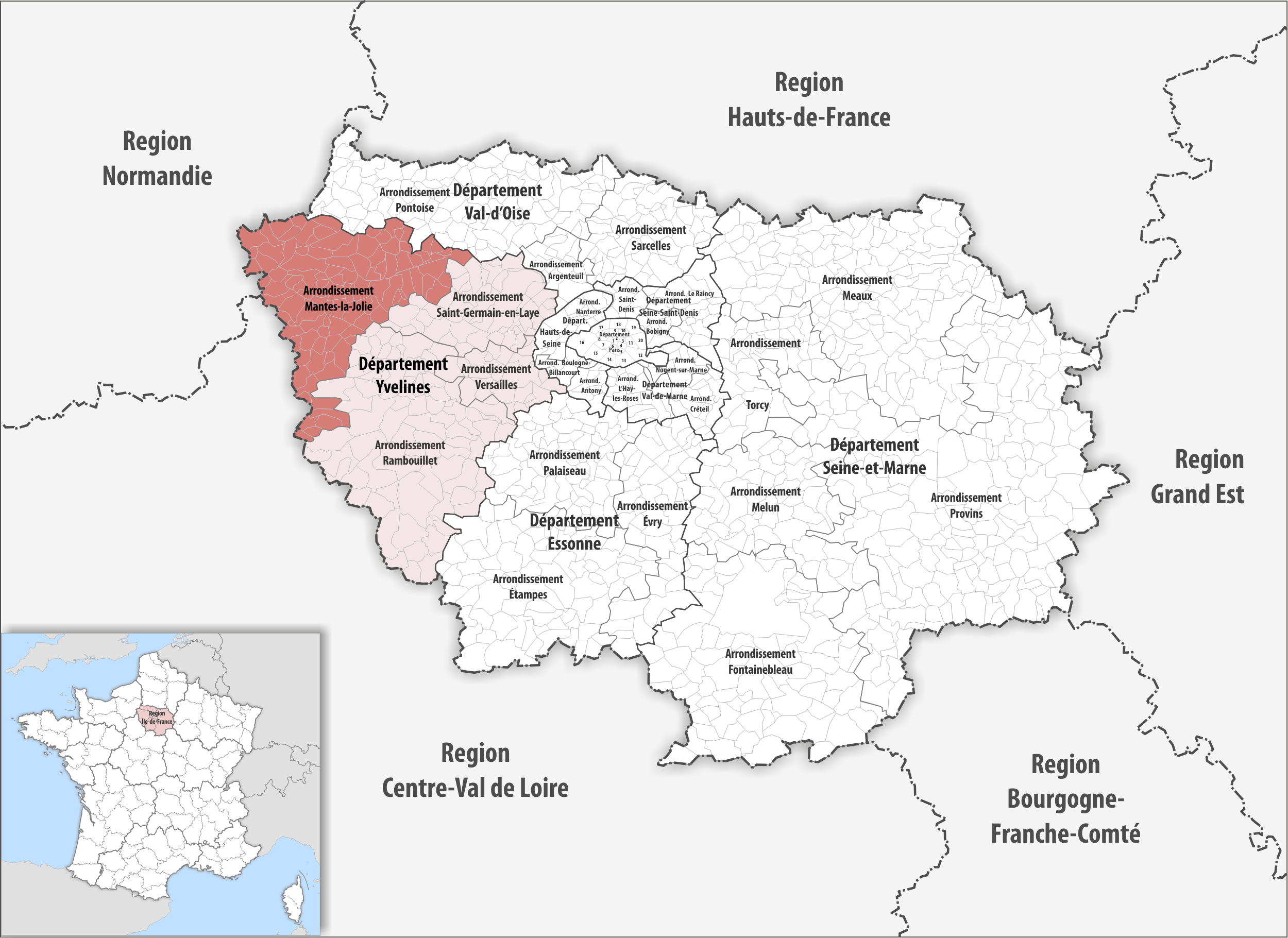
- Location within the region Île-de-France
- Country: France
- Region: Île-de-France
- Department: Yvelines
- No. of communes: {{{nbcomm}}}
- Area: 759.0 km^{2} (293.1 sq mi)
- Population (2023): 284,957
  - Density: 375.4/km^{2} (972.4/sq mi)
- INSEE code: 781

The arrondissement of Mantes-la-Jolie is an arrondissement of France in the Yvelines department in the Île-de-France region. It has 109 communes. Its population is 280,641 (2021), and its area is 759.0 km^{2} (293.1 sq mi).

== Composition ==
The communes of the arrondissement of Mantes-la-Jolie, and their INSEE codes, are:

1. Adainville (78006)
2. Arnouville-lès-Mantes (78020)
3. Aubergenville (78029)
4. Auffreville-Brasseuil (78031)
5. Aulnay-sur-Mauldre (78033)
6. Bazainville (78048)
7. Bennecourt (78057)
8. Blaru (78068)
9. Boinville-en-Mantois (78070)
10. Boinvilliers (78072)
11. Boissets (78076)
12. Boissy-Mauvoisin (78082)
13. Bonnières-sur-Seine (78089)
14. Bouafle (78090)
15. Bourdonné (78096)
16. Breuil-Bois-Robert (78104)
17. Bréval (78107)
18. Brueil-en-Vexin (78113)
19. Buchelay (78118)
20. Chapet (78140)
21. Chaufour-lès-Bonnières (78147)
22. Civry-la-Forêt (78163)
23. Condé-sur-Vesgre (78171)
24. Courgent (78185)
25. Cravent (78188)
26. Dammartin-en-Serve (78192)
27. Dannemarie (78194)
28. Drocourt (78202)
29. Ecquevilly (78206)
30. Épône (78217)
31. Évecquemont (78227)
32. La Falaise (78230)
33. Favrieux (78231)
34. Flacourt (78234)
35. Flins-Neuve-Église (78237)
36. Flins-sur-Seine (78238)
37. Follainville-Dennemont (78239)
38. Fontenay-Mauvoisin (78245)
39. Fontenay-Saint-Père (78246)
40. Freneuse (78255)
41. Gaillon-sur-Montcient (78261)
42. Gargenville (78267)
43. Gommecourt (78276)
44. Goussonville (78281)
45. Grandchamp (78283)
46. Gressey (78285)
47. Guernes (78290)
48. Guerville (78291)
49. Guitrancourt (78296)
50. Hardricourt (78299)
51. Hargeville (78300)
52. La Hauteville (78302)
53. Houdan (78310)
54. Issou (78314)
55. Jambville (78317)
56. Jouy-Mauvoisin (78324)
57. Jumeauville (78325)
58. Juziers (78327)
59. Lainville-en-Vexin (78329)
60. Limay (78335)
61. Limetz-Villez (78337)
62. Lommoye (78344)
63. Longnes (78346)
64. Magnanville (78354)
65. Mantes-la-Jolie (78361)
66. Mantes-la-Ville (78362)
67. Maulette (78381)
68. Ménerville (78385)
69. Méricourt (78391)
70. Meulan (78401)
71. Mézières-sur-Seine (78402)
72. Mézy-sur-Seine (78403)
73. Moisson (78410)
74. Mondreville (78413)
75. Montalet-le-Bois (78416)
76. Montchauvet (78417)
77. Mousseaux-sur-Seine (78437)
78. Mulcent (78439)
79. Les Mureaux (78440)
80. Neauphlette (78444)
81. Nézel (78451)
82. Notre-Dame-de-la-Mer (78320)
83. Oinville-sur-Montcient (78460)
84. Orgerus (78465)
85. Orvilliers (78474)
86. Osmoy (78475)
87. Perdreauville (78484)
88. Porcheville (78501)
89. Prunay-le-Temple (78505)
90. Richebourg (78520)
91. Rolleboise (78528)
92. Rosay (78530)
93. Rosny-sur-Seine (78531)
94. Sailly (78536)
95. Saint-Illiers-la-Ville (78558)
96. Saint-Illiers-le-Bois (78559)
97. Saint-Martin-des-Champs (78565)
98. Saint-Martin-la-Garenne (78567)
99. Septeuil (78591)
100. Soindres (78597)
101. Tacoignières (78605)
102. Le Tartre-Gaudran (78606)
103. Le Tertre-Saint-Denis (78608)
104. Tessancourt-sur-Aubette (78609)
105. Tilly (78618)
106. Vaux-sur-Seine (78638)
107. Vert (78647)
108. La Villeneuve-en-Chevrie (78668)
109. Villette (78677)

== History ==
The arrondissement of Mantes was created in 1800 as part of the department Seine-et-Oise, disbanded in 1926 and restored in 1943. In 1968 it became part of the new department Yvelines. At the January 2017 reorganisation of the arrondissements of Seine-et-Marne, it lost one commune to the arrondissement of Rambouillet and six communes to the arrondissement of Saint-Germain-en-Laye.

As a result of the reorganisation of the cantons of France which came into effect in 2015, the borders of the cantons are no longer related to the borders of the arrondissements. The cantons of the arrondissement of Mantes-la-Jolie were, as of January 2015:

1. Aubergenville
2. Bonnières-sur-Seine
3. Guerville
4. Houdan
5. Limay
6. Mantes-la-Jolie
7. Mantes-la-Ville
8. Meulan
