= Gaillon-sur-Montcient =

- Commune
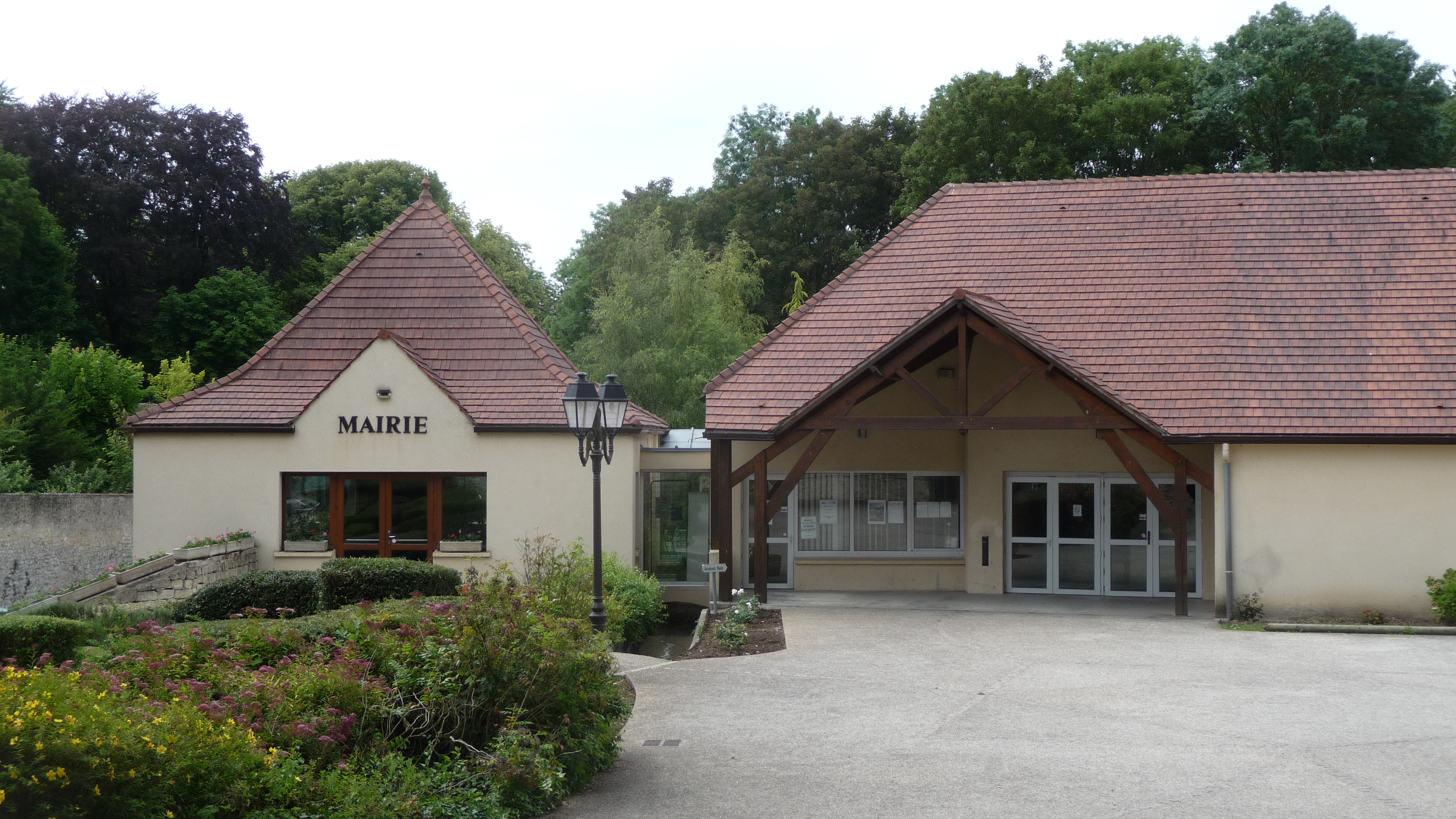
- The town hall in Gaillon-sur-Montcient
- Location of Gaillon-sur-Montcient
- Location within France Location within Île-de-France (region)
- Coordinates: 49°01′35″N 1°53′38″E
- Country: France
- Region: Île-de-France
- Department: Yvelines
- Arrondissement: Mantes-la-Jolie
- Canton: Les Mureaux
- Intercommunality: CU Grand Paris Seine et Oise

Government
  - Mayor (2022–2026): Marie-Christine Dubernard
- Area^{1}: 4.83 km^{2} (1.86 sq mi)
- Elevation: 91 m (299 ft)
- Highest elevation: 126 m (413 ft)
- Lowest elevation: 22 m (72 ft)
- Population (2023): 689
  - Density: 143/km^{2} (369/sq mi)
- Time zone: UTC+01:00 (CET)
  - Summer (DST): UTC+02:00 (CEST)
- INSEE/Postal code: 78261 /78250
- ^{1} French Land Register data, which excludes lakes, ponds, glaciers > 1 km^{2} (0.386 sq mi or 247 acres) and river estuaries.

Gaillon-sur-Montcient (French pronunciation: [ɡajɔ̃ syʁ mɔ̃sjɑ̃], lit. 'Gaillon on Montcient') is a commune in the Yvelines department in the Île-de-France region in north-central France.

== See also ==
- Communes of the Yvelines department
