= Grand Paris Seine et Oise =

Coordinates: 48.96°N 1.85°E

- Communauté urbaine
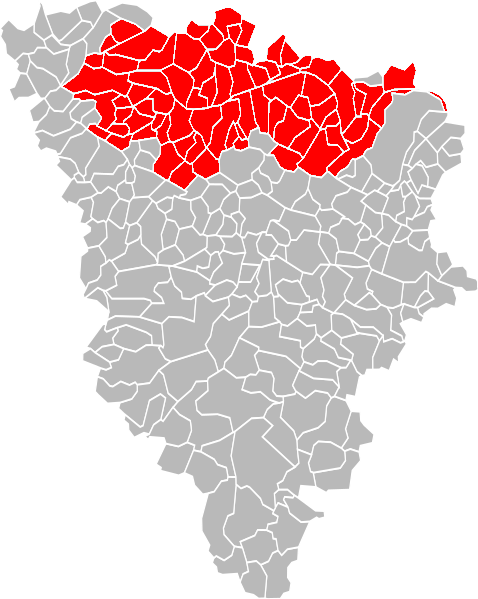
- Location within the Yvelines department
- Country: France
- Region: Île-de-France
- Department: Yvelines
- No. of communes: {{{nbcomm}}}
- Established: 2016
- Area: 504.7 km^{2} (194.9 sq mi)
- Population (2018): 417,556
  - Density: 827.3/km^{2} (2,143/sq mi)
- Website: gpseo.fr

The Communauté urbaine Grand Paris Seine et Oise is the communauté urbaine, an intercommunal structure, covering the western suburbs of Paris. It is located in the Yvelines department, in the Île-de-France region, northern France. It was created in January 2016 by the merger of the previous communautés d'agglomération Mantes-en-Yvelines, Deux Rives de la Seine, Poissy-Achères-Conflans-Sainte-Honorine, Seine & Vexin and the communautés de communes Coteaux du Vexin and Seine-Mauldre. Its area is 504.7 km^{2}. Its population was 417,556 in 2018. Its seat is in Aubergenville.

== Composition ==
The communauté urbaine consists of the following 73 communes:

1. Achères
2. Les Alluets-le-Roi
3. Andrésy
4. Arnouville-lès-Mantes
5. Aubergenville
6. Auffreville-Brasseuil
7. Aulnay-sur-Mauldre
8. Boinville-en-Mantois
9. Bouafle
10. Breuil-Bois-Robert
11. Brueil-en-Vexin
12. Buchelay
13. Carrières-sous-Poissy
14. Chanteloup-les-Vignes
15. Chapet
16. Conflans-Sainte-Honorine
17. Drocourt
18. Ecquevilly
19. Épône
20. Évecquemont
21. La Falaise
22. Favrieux
23. Flacourt
24. Flins-sur-Seine
25. Follainville-Dennemont
26. Fontenay-Mauvoisin
27. Fontenay-Saint-Père
28. Gaillon-sur-Montcient
29. Gargenville
30. Goussonville
31. Guernes
32. Guerville
33. Guitrancourt
34. Hardricourt
35. Hargeville
36. Issou
37. Jambville
38. Jouy-Mauvoisin
39. Jumeauville
40. Juziers
41. Lainville-en-Vexin
42. Limay
43. Magnanville
44. Mantes-la-Jolie
45. Mantes-la-Ville
46. Médan
47. Méricourt
48. Meulan-en-Yvelines
49. Mézières-sur-Seine
50. Mézy-sur-Seine
51. Montalet-le-Bois
52. Morainvilliers
53. Mousseaux-sur-Seine
54. Les Mureaux
55. Nézel
56. Oinville-sur-Montcient
57. Orgeval
58. Perdreauville
59. Poissy
60. Porcheville
61. Rolleboise
62. Rosny-sur-Seine
63. Sailly
64. Saint-Martin-la-Garenne
65. Soindres
66. Le Tertre-Saint-Denis
67. Tessancourt-sur-Aubette
68. Triel-sur-Seine
69. Vaux-sur-Seine
70. Verneuil-sur-Seine
71. Vernouillet
72. Vert
73. Villennes-sur-Seine
