= Aulnay-sur-Mauldre =

- Commune
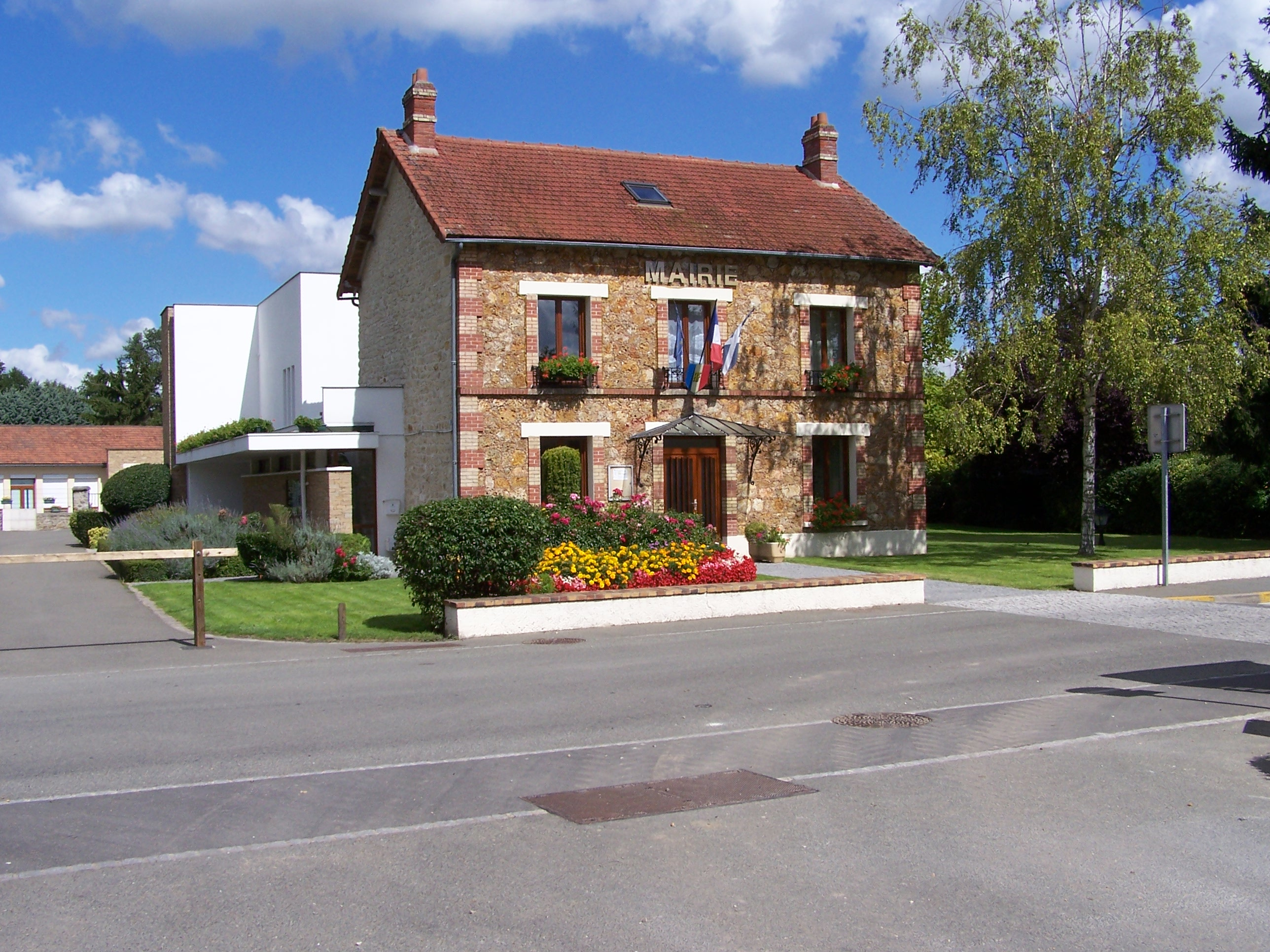
- Town hall
- Location of Aulnay-sur-Mauldre
- Location within France Location within Île-de-France (region)
- Coordinates: 48°55′44″N 1°50′28″E
- Country: France
- Region: Île-de-France
- Department: Yvelines
- Arrondissement: Mantes-la-Jolie
- Canton: Aubergenville
- Intercommunality: CU Grand Paris Seine Oise

Government
  - Mayor (2020–2026): Jean Christophe Charbit
- Area^{1}: 2.23 km^{2} (0.86 sq mi)
- Elevation: 35 m (115 ft)
- Highest elevation: 126 m (413 ft)
- Lowest elevation: 22 m (72 ft)
- Population (2023): 1,180
  - Density: 529/km^{2} (1,370/sq mi)
- Time zone: UTC+01:00 (CET)
  - Summer (DST): UTC+02:00 (CEST)
- INSEE/Postal code: 78033 /78126
- ^{1} French Land Register data, which excludes lakes, ponds, glaciers > 1 km^{2} (0.386 sq mi or 247 acres) and river estuaries.

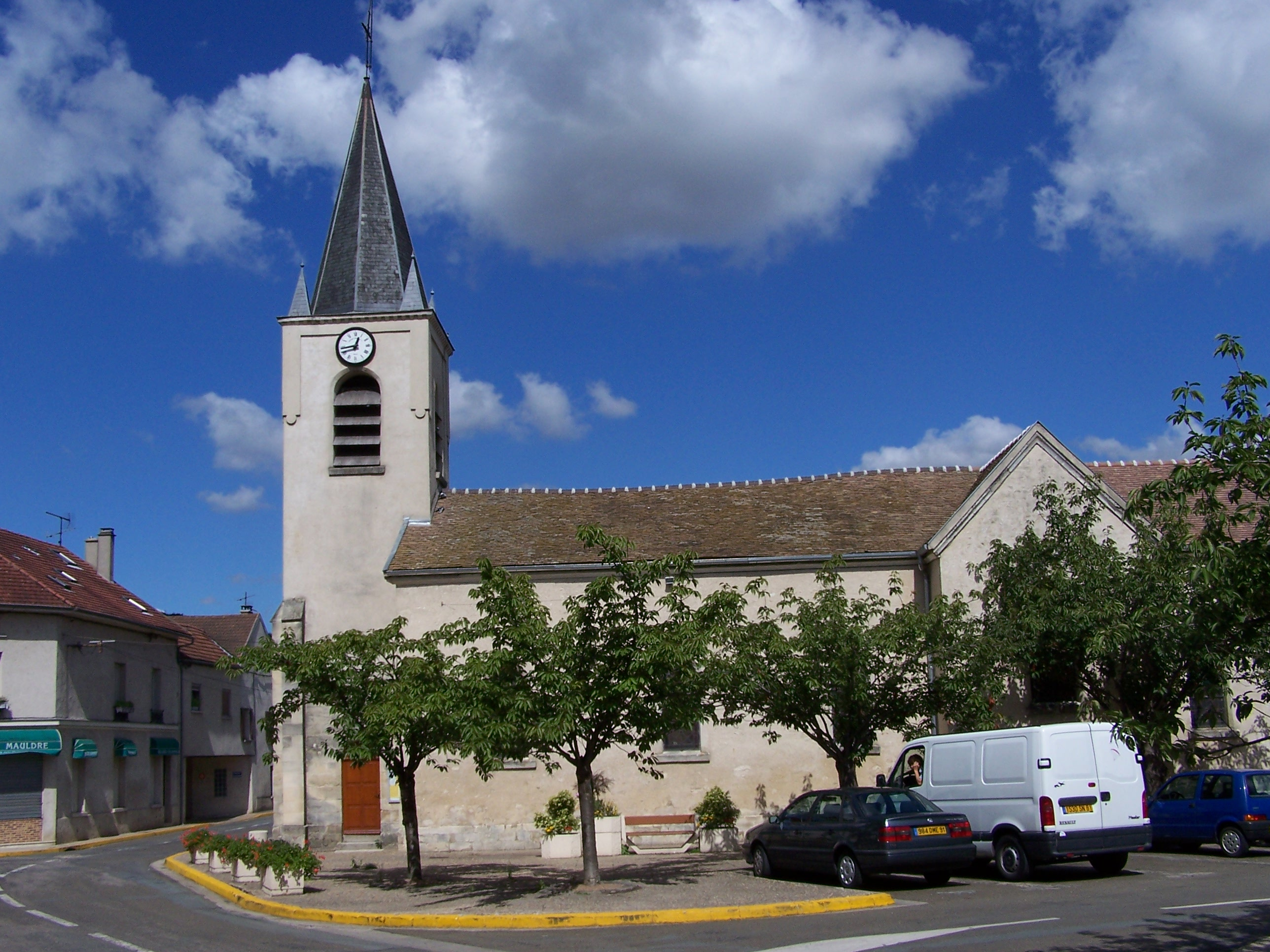
Saint-Étienne

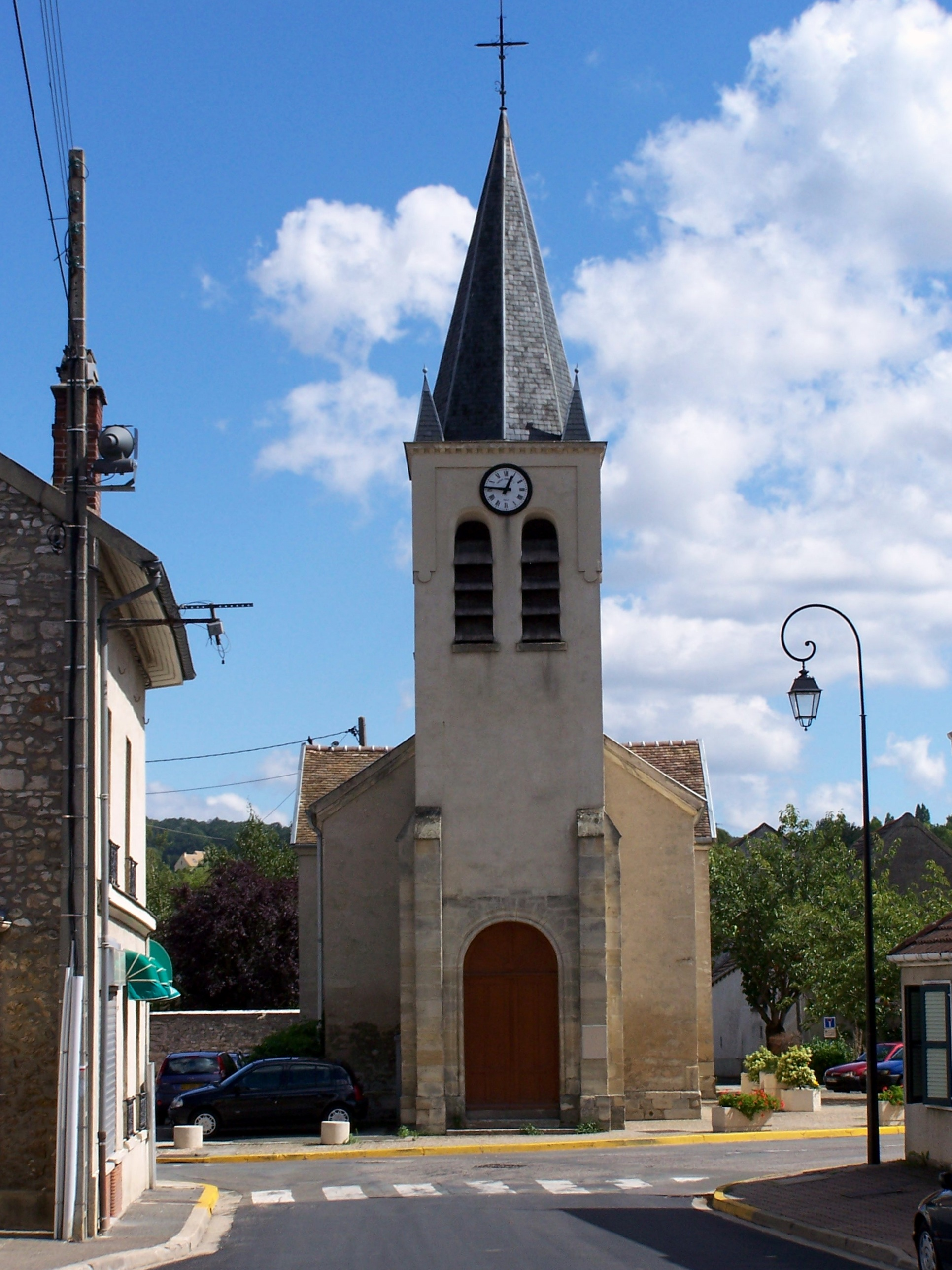
Saint-Étienne

Aulnay-sur-Mauldre (French pronunciation: [o(l)nɛ syʁ moldʁ]) is a commune in the Yvelines department in north-central France.

== Population ==
Historical population
Year	Pop.	±% p.a.
1968	521	—
1975	585	+1.67%
1982	959	+7.32%
1990	1,026	+0.85%
1999	1,105	+0.83%
2007	1,151	+0.51%
2012	1,155	+0.07%
2017	1,140	−0.26%
2023	1,180	+0.58%
Source: INSEE

== See also ==
- Communes of the Yvelines department
