= Oinville-sur-Montcient =

- Commune
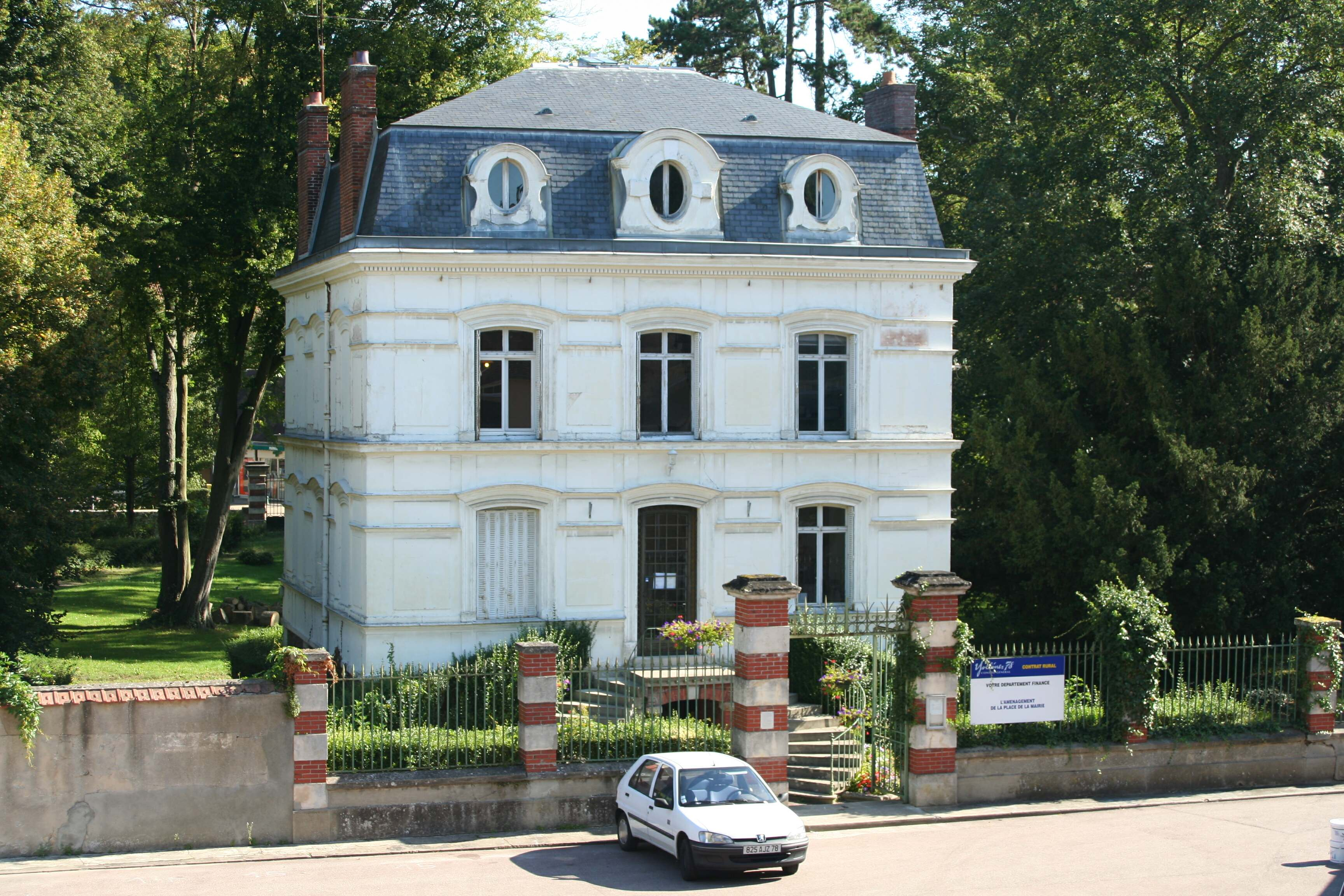
- Town hall
- Location of Oinville-sur-Montcient
- Location within France Location within Île-de-France (region)
- Coordinates: 49°01′42″N 1°51′01″E
- Country: France
- Region: Île-de-France
- Department: Yvelines
- Arrondissement: Mantes-la-Jolie
- Canton: Limay
- Intercommunality: CU Grand Paris Seine et Oise

Government
  - Mayor (2024–2026): Didier Gaulard
- Area^{1}: 3.87 km^{2} (1.49 sq mi)
- Elevation: 100 m (330 ft)
- Highest elevation: 135 m (443 ft)
- Lowest elevation: 36 m (118 ft)
- Population (2023): 1,131
  - Density: 292/km^{2} (757/sq mi)
- Time zone: UTC+01:00 (CET)
  - Summer (DST): UTC+02:00 (CEST)
- INSEE/Postal code: 78460 /78250
- ^{1} French Land Register data, which excludes lakes, ponds, glaciers > 1 km^{2} (0.386 sq mi or 247 acres) and river estuaries.

Oinville-sur-Montcient (French pronunciation: [wɛ̃vil syʁ mɔ̃sjɑ̃], lit. 'Oinville on Montcient') is a commune in the Yvelines department in the Île-de-France region in north-central France.

== See also ==
- Communes of the Yvelines department
