= Auffreville-Brasseuil =

- Commune
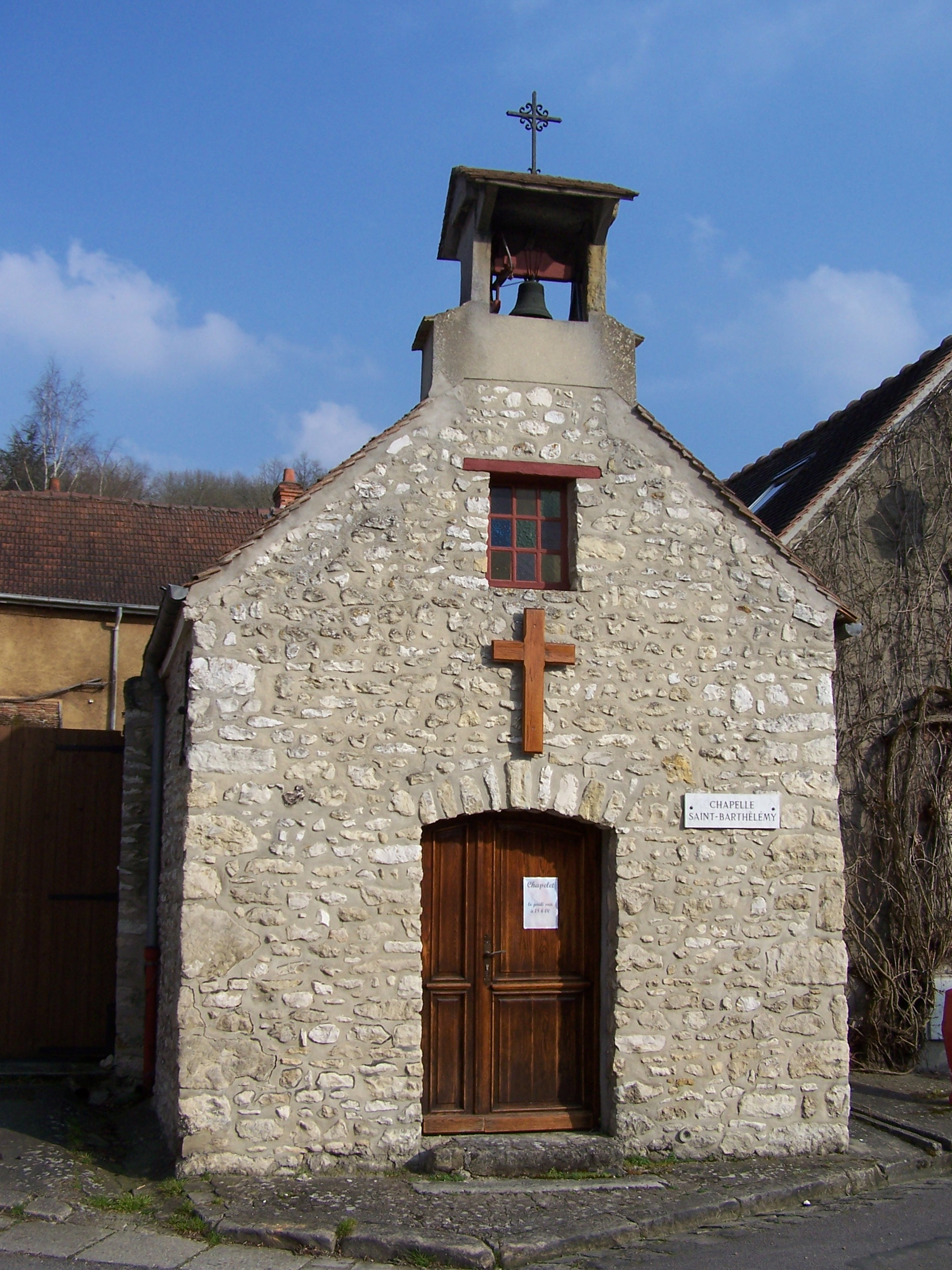
- The Chapel in Auffreville-Brasseuil

- Coat of arms
- Location of Auffreville-Brasseuil
- Location within France Location within Île-de-France (region)
- Coordinates: 48°57′14″N 1°42′40″E
- Country: France
- Region: Île-de-France
- Department: Yvelines
- Arrondissement: Mantes-la-Jolie
- Canton: Bonnières-sur-Seine
- Intercommunality: CU Grand Paris Seine Oise

Government
  - Mayor (2020–2026): Serge Ancelot
- Area^{1}: 2.37 km^{2} (0.92 sq mi)
- Elevation: 32 m (105 ft)
- Highest elevation: 127 m (417 ft)
- Lowest elevation: 24 m (79 ft)
- Population (2023): 671
  - Density: 283/km^{2} (733/sq mi)
- Time zone: UTC+01:00 (CET)
  - Summer (DST): UTC+02:00 (CEST)
- INSEE/Postal code: 78031 /78930
- ^{1} French Land Register data, which excludes lakes, ponds, glaciers > 1 km^{2} (0.386 sq mi or 247 acres) and river estuaries.

Auffreville-Brasseuil (French pronunciation: [ofʁəvil bʁasœj]) is a commune in the Yvelines department in north-central France.

== Population ==
Historical population
Year	Pop.	±% p.a.
1968	338	—
1975	445	+4.01%
1982	454	+0.29%
1990	560	+2.66%
1999	586	+0.51%
2007	604	+0.38%
2012	612	+0.26%
2017	650	+1.21%
2023	671	+0.53%
Source: INSEE

== See also ==
- Communes of the Yvelines department
