= Hargeville =

- Commune
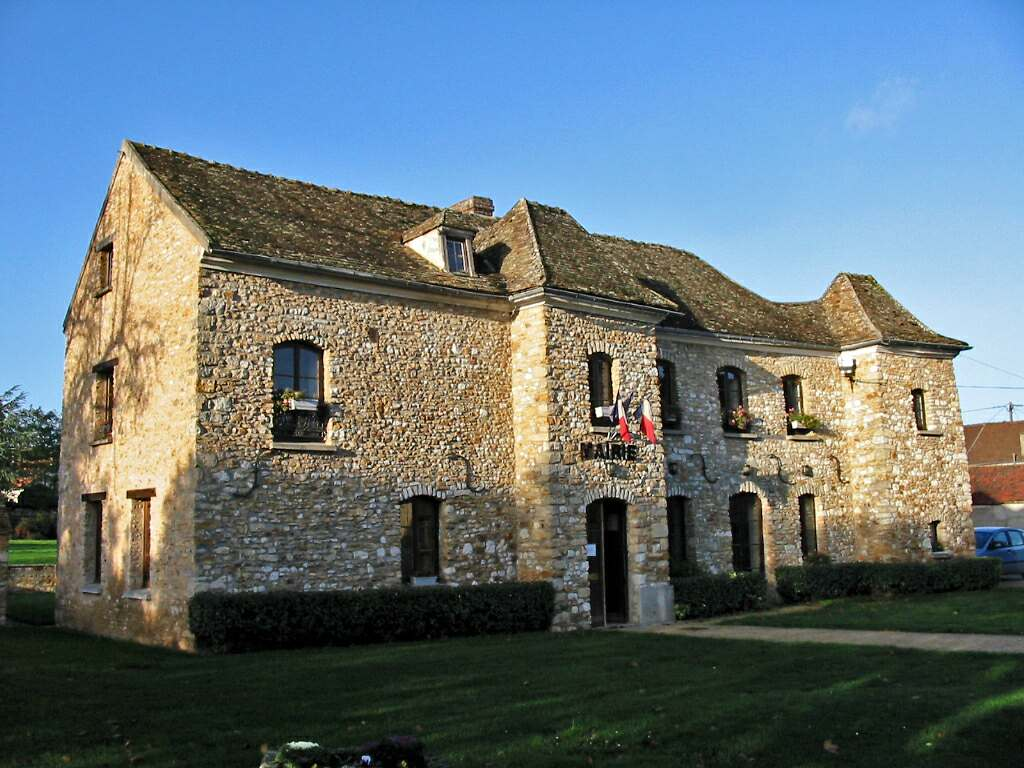
- Town hall
- Location of Hargeville
- Location within France Location within Île-de-France (region)
- Coordinates: 48°53′28″N 1°44′30″E
- Country: France
- Region: Île-de-France
- Department: Yvelines
- Arrondissement: Mantes-la-Jolie
- Canton: Bonnières-sur-Seine
- Intercommunality: CU Grand Paris Seine et Oise

Government
  - Mayor (2020–2026): Jean Michel Voyer
- Area^{1}: 7.08 km^{2} (2.73 sq mi)
- Elevation: 130 m (430 ft)
- Highest elevation: 176 m (577 ft)
- Lowest elevation: 114 m (374 ft)
- Population (2023): 418
  - Density: 59.0/km^{2} (153/sq mi)
- Time zone: UTC+01:00 (CET)
  - Summer (DST): UTC+02:00 (CEST)
- INSEE/Postal code: 78300 /78790
- ^{1} French Land Register data, which excludes lakes, ponds, glaciers > 1 km^{2} (0.386 sq mi or 247 acres) and river estuaries.

Hargeville (French pronunciation: [aʁʒəvil]) is a commune in the Yvelines department in the Île-de-France region in north-central France.

== See also ==
- Communes of the Yvelines department
