= Favrieux =

- Commune
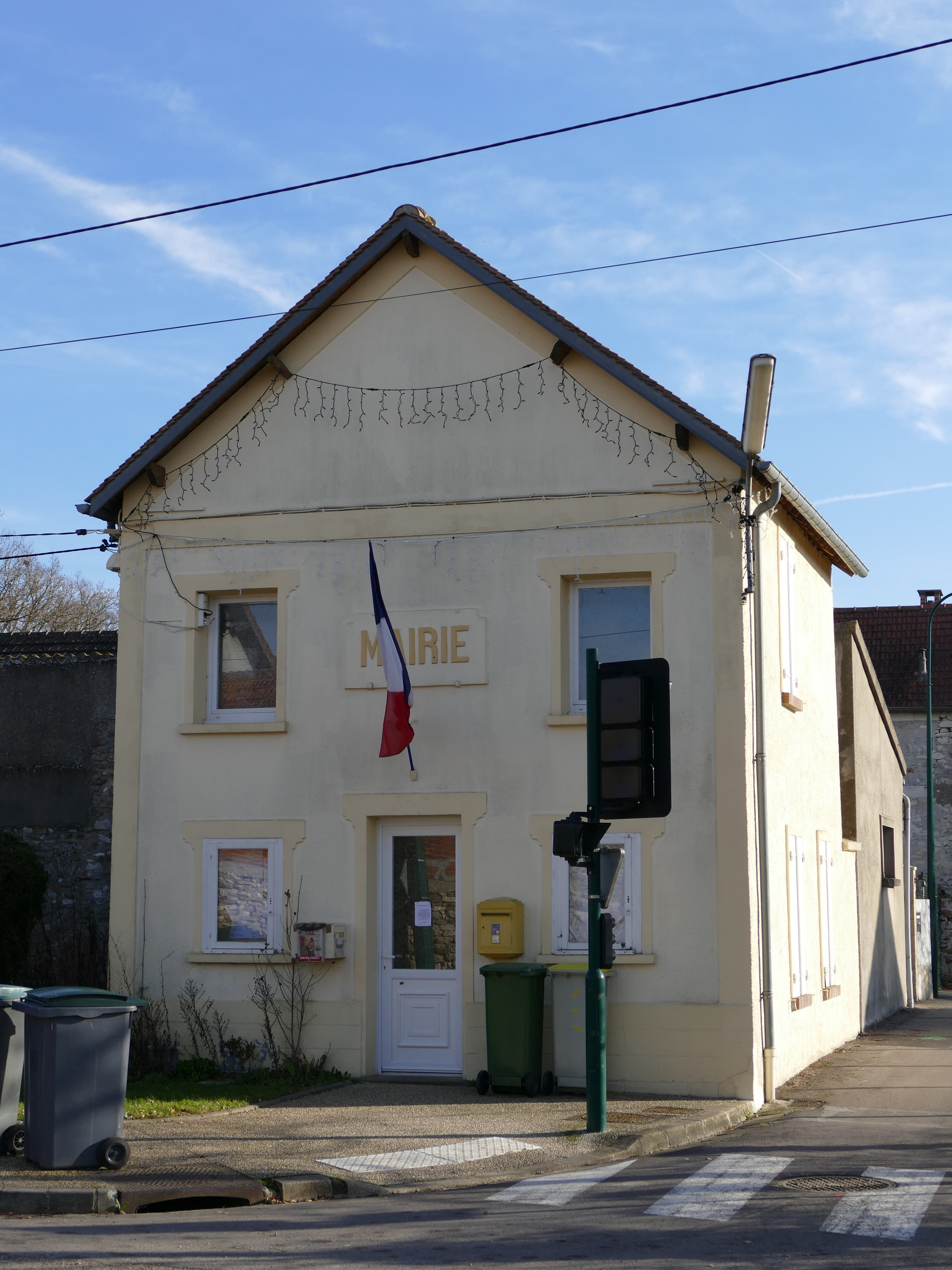
- The town hall in Favrieux
- Location of Favrieux
- Location within France Location within Île-de-France (region)
- Coordinates: 48°56′41″N 1°38′35″E
- Country: France
- Region: Île-de-France
- Department: Yvelines
- Arrondissement: Mantes-la-Jolie
- Canton: Bonnières-sur-Seine
- Intercommunality: CU Grand Paris Seine et Oise

Government
  - Mayor (2020–2026): Lionel Lemarié
- Area^{1}: 3.18 km^{2} (1.23 sq mi)
- Elevation: 130 m (430 ft)
- Highest elevation: 141 m (463 ft)
- Lowest elevation: 100 m (330 ft)
- Population (2023): 157
  - Density: 49.4/km^{2} (128/sq mi)
- Time zone: UTC+01:00 (CET)
  - Summer (DST): UTC+02:00 (CEST)
- INSEE/Postal code: 78231 /78200
- ^{1} French Land Register data, which excludes lakes, ponds, glaciers > 1 km^{2} (0.386 sq mi or 247 acres) and river estuaries.

Favrieux (French pronunciation: [favʁijø]) is a commune in the Yvelines department in the Île-de-France in north-central France.

== See also ==
- Communes of the Yvelines department
