= Le Tertre-Saint-Denis =

- Commune
- Location of Le Tertre-Saint-Denis
- Location within France Location within Île-de-France (region)
- Coordinates: 48°56′22″N 1°36′23″E
- Country: France
- Region: Île-de-France
- Department: Yvelines
- Arrondissement: Mantes-la-Jolie
- Canton: Bonnières-sur-Seine
- Intercommunality: CU Grand Paris Seine et Oise

Government
  - Mayor (2020–2026): Joël Mariage
- Area^{1}: 2.91 km^{2} (1.12 sq mi)
- Elevation: 168 m (551 ft)
- Highest elevation: 168 m (551 ft)
- Lowest elevation: 123 m (404 ft)
- Population (2023): 137
  - Density: 47.1/km^{2} (122/sq mi)
- Time zone: UTC+01:00 (CET)
  - Summer (DST): UTC+02:00 (CEST)
- INSEE/Postal code: 78608 /78980
- ^{1} French Land Register data, which excludes lakes, ponds, glaciers > 1 km^{2} (0.386 sq mi or 247 acres) and river estuaries.

Le Tertre-Saint-Denis (French pronunciation: [lə tɛʁtʁ sɛ̃ dəni]) is a commune in the Yvelines department in the Île-de-France in north-central France.

== See also ==
- Communes of the Yvelines department
