= Jouy-Mauvoisin =

- Commune
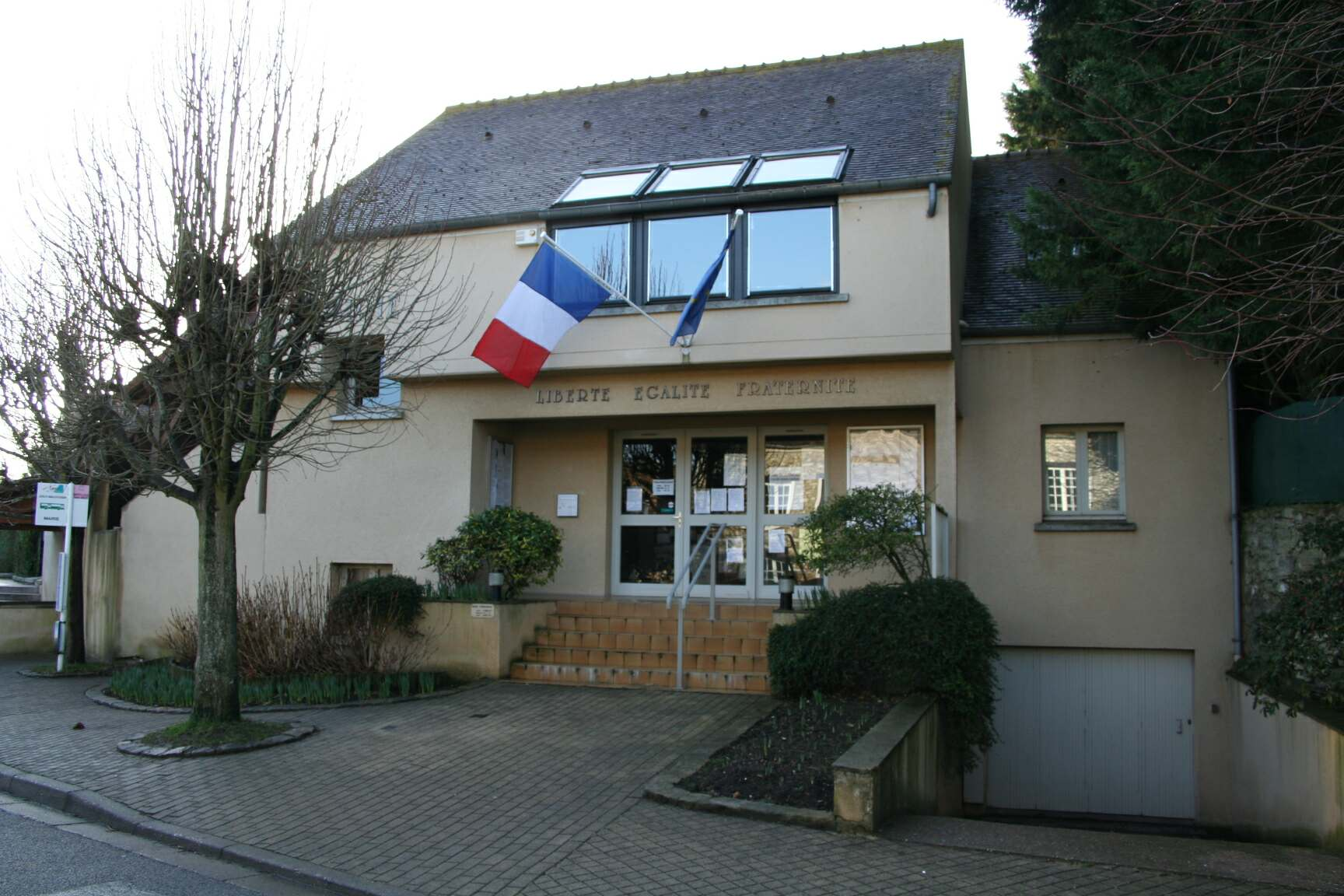
- Town hall
- Location of Jouy-Mauvoisin
- Location within France Location within Île-de-France (region)
- Coordinates: 48°58′34″N 1°38′56″E
- Country: France
- Region: Île-de-France
- Department: Yvelines
- Arrondissement: Mantes-la-Jolie
- Canton: Bonnières-sur-Seine
- Intercommunality: CU Grand Paris Seine et Oise

Government
  - Mayor (2020–2026): Alain Bertrand
- Area^{1}: 2.82 km^{2} (1.09 sq mi)
- Elevation: 90 m (300 ft)
- Highest elevation: 145 m (476 ft)
- Lowest elevation: 57 m (187 ft)
- Population (2023): 554
  - Density: 196/km^{2} (509/sq mi)
- Time zone: UTC+01:00 (CET)
  - Summer (DST): UTC+02:00 (CEST)
- INSEE/Postal code: 78324 /78200
- ^{1} French Land Register data, which excludes lakes, ponds, glaciers > 1 km^{2} (0.386 sq mi or 247 acres) and river estuaries.

Jouy-Mauvoisin (French pronunciation: [ʒwi movwazɛ̃]) is a commune in the Yvelines department in the Île-de-France region in north-central France.

== See also ==
- Communes of the Yvelines department
