= Vert, Yvelines =

Vert
- Commune
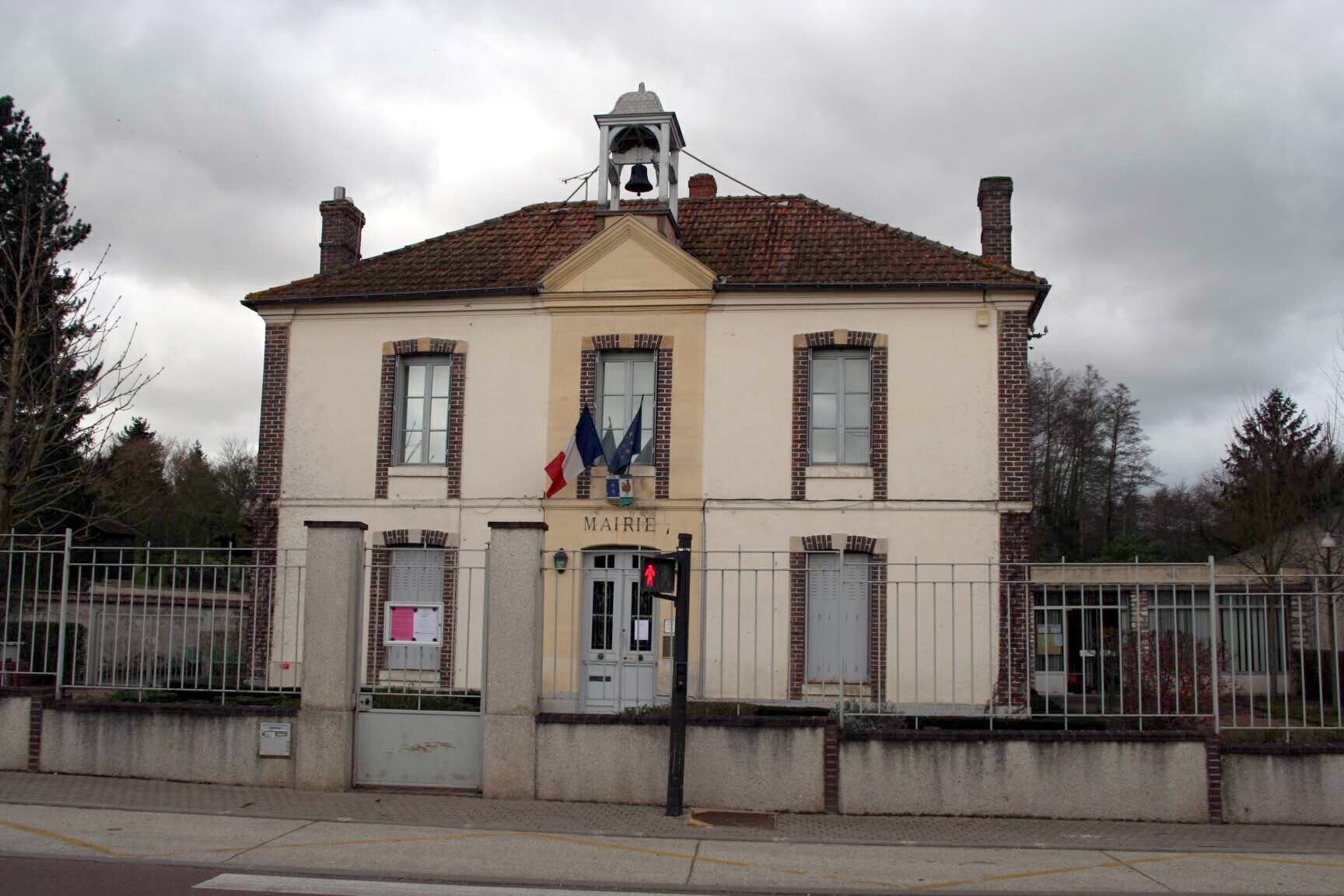
- Town hall

- Coat of arms
- Location of Vert
- Location within France Location within Île-de-France (region)
- Coordinates: 48°56′32″N 1°41′30″E
- Country: France
- Region: Île-de-France
- Department: Yvelines
- Arrondissement: Mantes-la-Jolie
- Canton: Bonnières-sur-Seine
- Intercommunality: CU Grand Paris Seine et Oise

Government
  - Mayor (2020–2026): Jocelyne Reynaud-Leger
- Area^{1}: 3.67 km^{2} (1.42 sq mi)
- Elevation: 45 m (148 ft)
- Highest elevation: 134 m (440 ft)
- Lowest elevation: 35 m (115 ft)
- Population (2023): 852
  - Density: 232/km^{2} (601/sq mi)
- Time zone: UTC+01:00 (CET)
  - Summer (DST): UTC+02:00 (CEST)
- INSEE/Postal code: 78647 /78930
- ^{1} French Land Register data, which excludes lakes, ponds, glaciers > 1 km^{2} (0.386 sq mi or 247 acres) and river estuaries.

Vert (French pronunciation: [vɛʁ]) is a commune in the Yvelines department in the Île-de-France region in north-central France.

== Demographics ==
Historical population
Year	Pop.	±% p.a.
1968	417	—
1975	636	+6.22%
1982	778	+2.92%
1990	768	−0.16%
1999	737	−0.46%
2007	776	+0.65%
2012	806	+0.76%
2017	831	+0.61%
2023	852	+0.42%
Source: INSEE

== See also ==
- Communes of the Yvelines department
