= Saint-Martin-la-Garenne =

- Commune
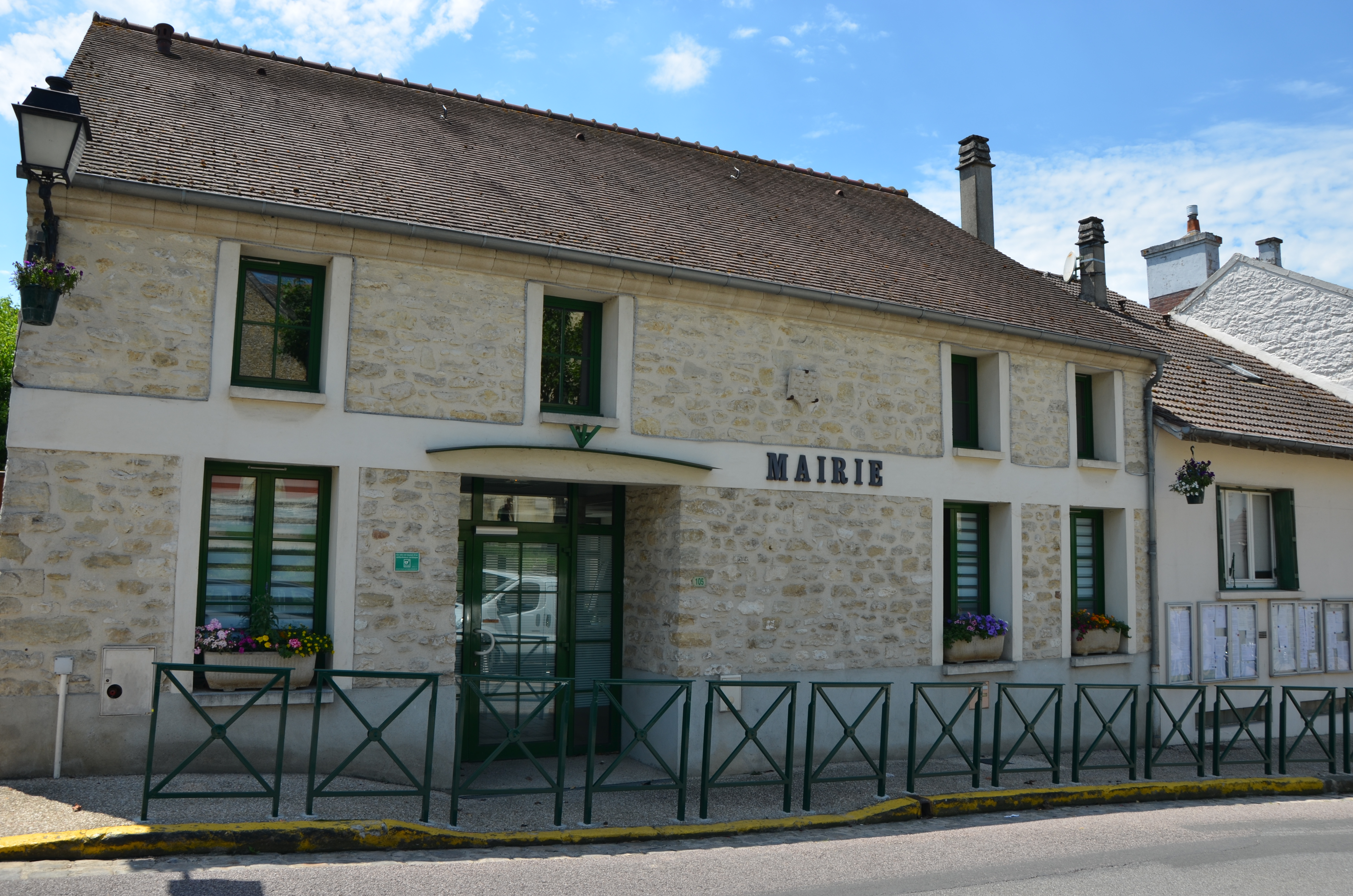
- Town hall
- Location of Saint-Martin-la-Garenne
- Location within France Location within Île-de-France (region)
- Coordinates: 49°02′27″N 1°41′23″E
- Country: France
- Region: Île-de-France
- Department: Yvelines
- Arrondissement: Mantes-la-Jolie
- Canton: Limay
- Intercommunality: CU Grand Paris Seine et Oise

Government
  - Mayor (2020–2026): Stephan Champagne
- Area^{1}: 15.75 km^{2} (6.08 sq mi)
- Highest elevation: 152 m (499 ft)
- Lowest elevation: 9 m (30 ft)
- Population (2023): 942
  - Density: 59.8/km^{2} (155/sq mi)
- Time zone: UTC+01:00 (CET)
  - Summer (DST): UTC+02:00 (CEST)
- INSEE/Postal code: 78567 /78520
- ^{1} French Land Register data, which excludes lakes, ponds, glaciers > 1 km^{2} (0.386 sq mi or 247 acres) and river estuaries.

Saint-Martin-la-Garenne (French pronunciation: [sɛ̃ maʁtɛ̃ la ɡaʁɛn]) is a commune in the Yvelines department in the Île-de-France region in north-central France.

== See also ==
- Communes of the Yvelines department
