= Perdreauville =

- Commune
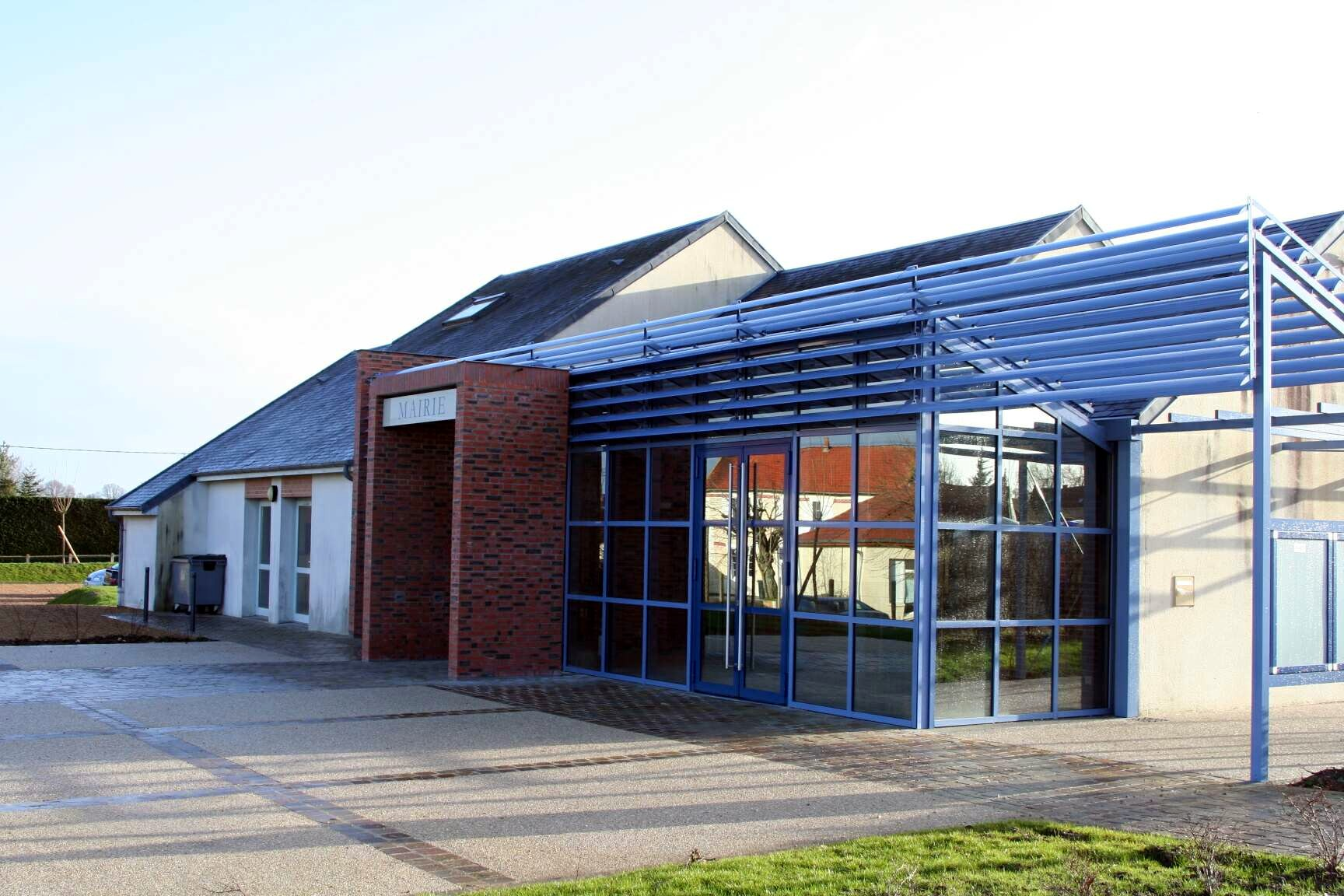
- The town hall in Perdreauville
- Location of Perdreauville
- Location within France Location within Île-de-France (region)
- Coordinates: 48°57′55″N 1°37′47″E
- Country: France
- Region: Île-de-France
- Department: Yvelines
- Arrondissement: Mantes-la-Jolie
- Canton: Bonnières-sur-Seine
- Intercommunality: CU Grand Paris Seine et Oise

Government
  - Mayor (2020–2026): Pascal Poyer
- Area^{1}: 11.18 km^{2} (4.32 sq mi)
- Elevation: 130 m (430 ft)
- Highest elevation: 151 m (495 ft)
- Lowest elevation: 40 m (130 ft)
- Population (2023): 701
  - Density: 62.7/km^{2} (162/sq mi)
- Time zone: UTC+01:00 (CET)
  - Summer (DST): UTC+02:00 (CEST)
- INSEE/Postal code: 78484 /78200
- ^{1} French Land Register data, which excludes lakes, ponds, glaciers > 1 km^{2} (0.386 sq mi or 247 acres) and river estuaries.

Perdreauville (French pronunciation: [pɛʁdʁovil]) is a commune in the Yvelines department in the Île-de-France in north-central France.

== See also ==
- Communes of the Yvelines department
