= Breuil-Bois-Robert =

- Commune
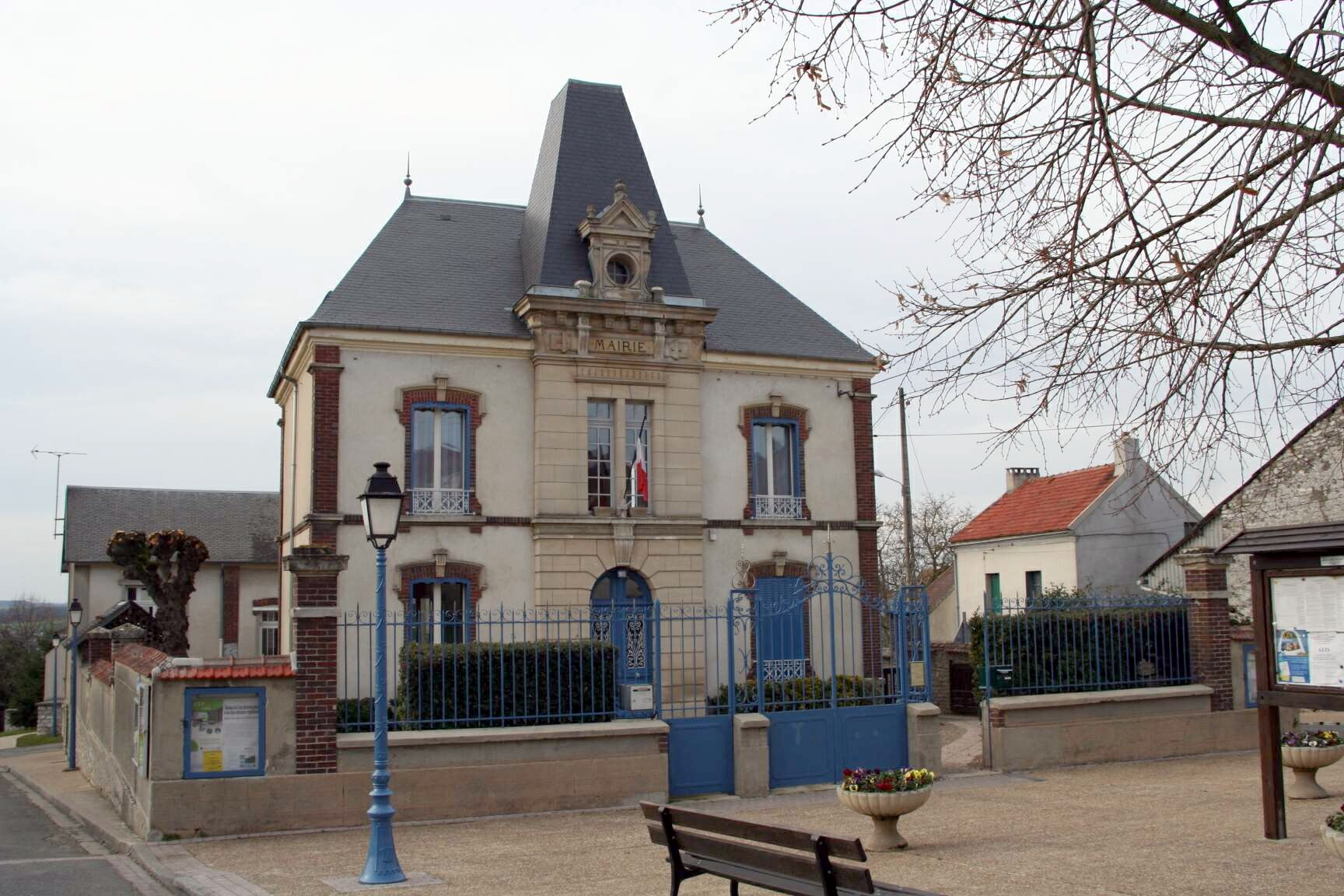
- The town hall in Breuil-Bois-Robert
- Location of Breuil-Bois-Robert
- Location within France Location within Île-de-France (region)
- Coordinates: 48°56′46″N 1°43′01″E
- Country: France
- Region: Île-de-France
- Department: Yvelines
- Arrondissement: Mantes-la-Jolie
- Canton: Bonnières-sur-Seine
- Intercommunality: CU Grand Paris Seine et Oise

Government
  - Mayor (2020–2026): Bernard Moisan
- Area^{1}: 3.75 km^{2} (1.45 sq mi)
- Elevation: 130 m (430 ft)
- Highest elevation: 147 m (482 ft)
- Lowest elevation: 42 m (138 ft)
- Population (2023): 764
  - Density: 204/km^{2} (528/sq mi)
- Time zone: UTC+01:00 (CET)
  - Summer (DST): UTC+02:00 (CEST)
- INSEE/Postal code: 78104 /78930
- ^{1} French Land Register data, which excludes lakes, ponds, glaciers > 1 km^{2} (0.386 sq mi or 247 acres) and river estuaries.

Breuil-Bois-Robert (French pronunciation: [bʁœj bwa ʁɔbɛʁ]) is a commune in the Yvelines department in the Île-de-France region in north-central France.

== History ==
The commune of Breuil-Bois-Robert was created in 1868 from the merger of two former communes: Breuil and Bois-Robert-et-Labrosse.

== See also ==
- Communes of the Yvelines department
