= Jumeauville =

- Commune
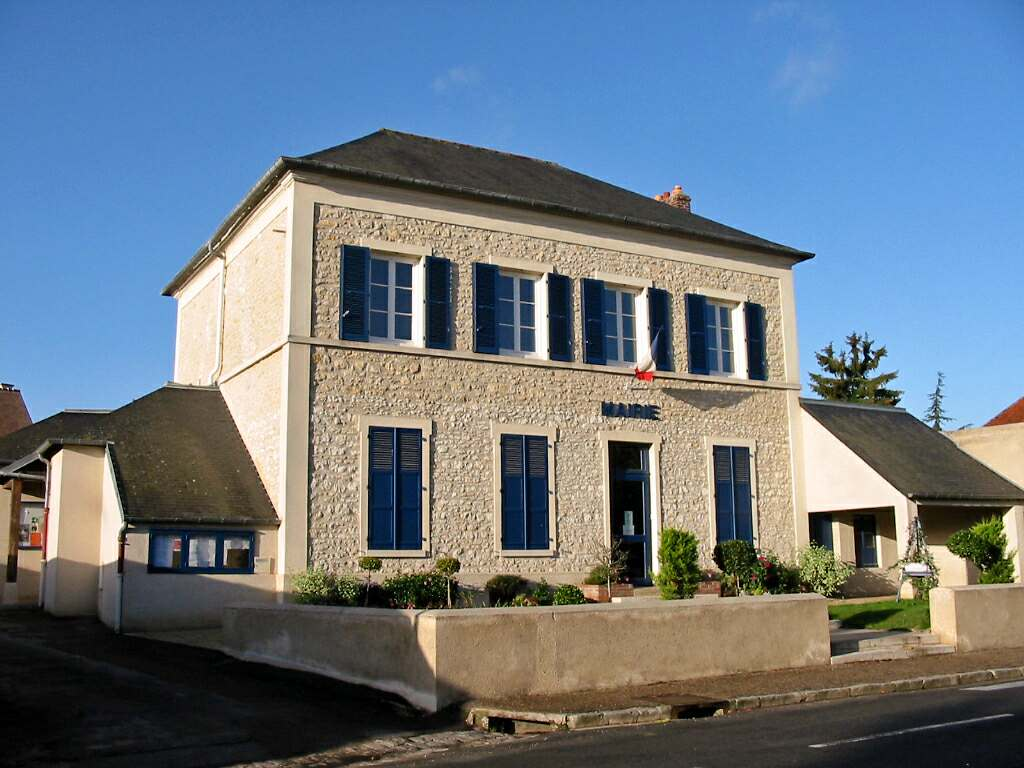
- The town hall in Jumeauville

- Coat of arms
- Location of Jumeauville
- Location within France Location within Île-de-France (region)
- Coordinates: 48°54′41″N 1°47′20″E
- Country: France
- Region: Île-de-France
- Department: Yvelines
- Arrondissement: Mantes-la-Jolie
- Canton: Bonnières-sur-Seine
- Intercommunality: CU Grand Paris Seine et Oise

Government
  - Mayor (2020–2026): Jean-Claude Lucien Langlois
- Area^{1}: 7.77 km^{2} (3.00 sq mi)
- Elevation: 126 m (413 ft)
- Highest elevation: 139 m (456 ft)
- Lowest elevation: 83 m (272 ft)
- Population (2023): 638
  - Density: 82.1/km^{2} (213/sq mi)
- Time zone: UTC+01:00 (CET)
  - Summer (DST): UTC+02:00 (CEST)
- INSEE/Postal code: 78325 /78580
- ^{1} French Land Register data, which excludes lakes, ponds, glaciers > 1 km^{2} (0.386 sq mi or 247 acres) and river estuaries.

Jumeauville (French pronunciation: [ʒymovil]) is a commune in the Yvelines department in the Île-de-France region in north-central France.

== See also ==
- Communes of the Yvelines department
