= Méricourt, Yvelines =

Méricourt
- Commune
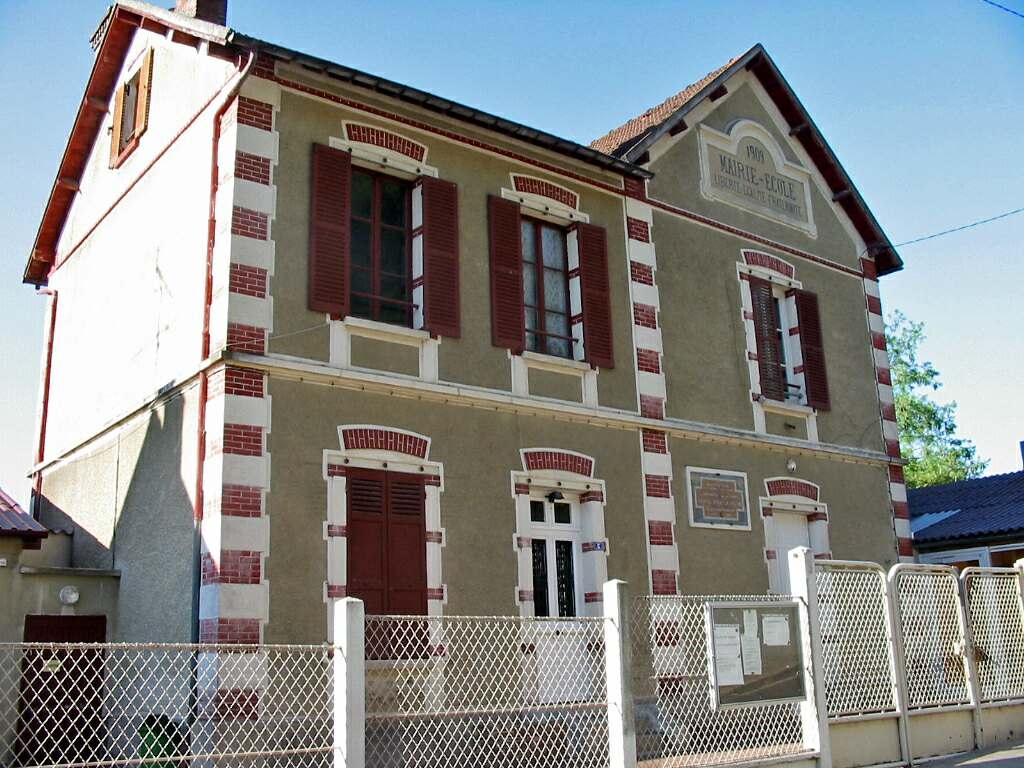
- Town hall
- Location of Méricourt
- Location within France Location within Île-de-France (region)
- Coordinates: 49°02′14″N 1°37′40″E
- Country: France
- Region: Île-de-France
- Department: Yvelines
- Arrondissement: Mantes-la-Jolie
- Canton: Bonnières-sur-Seine
- Intercommunality: CU Grand Paris Seine et Oise

Government
  - Mayor (2020–2026): Philippe Jumeaucourt
- Area^{1}: 2.15 km^{2} (0.83 sq mi)
- Elevation: 19 m (62 ft)
- Highest elevation: 86 m (282 ft)
- Lowest elevation: 12 m (39 ft)
- Population (2023): 383
  - Density: 178/km^{2} (461/sq mi)
- Time zone: UTC+01:00 (CET)
  - Summer (DST): UTC+02:00 (CEST)
- INSEE/Postal code: 78391 /78270
- ^{1} French Land Register data, which excludes lakes, ponds, glaciers > 1 km^{2} (0.386 sq mi or 247 acres) and river estuaries.

Méricourt (French pronunciation: [meʁikuʁ]) is a commune in the Yvelines department in the Île-de-France region in north-central France.

== See also ==
- Communes of the Yvelines department
