= Arnouville-lès-Mantes =

- Commune
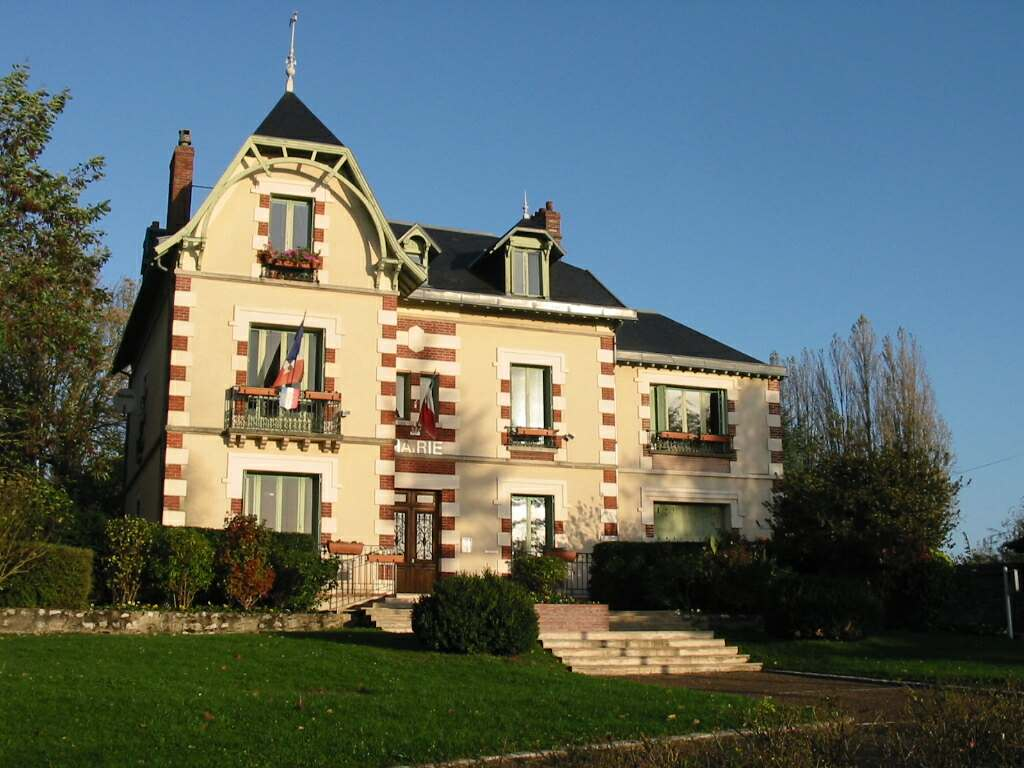
- Town hall
- Location of Arnouville-lès-Mantes
- Location within France Location within Île-de-France (region)
- Coordinates: 48°55′N 1°44′E
- Country: France
- Region: Île-de-France
- Department: Yvelines
- Arrondissement: Mantes-la-Jolie
- Canton: Bonnières-sur-Seine
- Intercommunality: CU Grand Paris Seine Oise

Government
  - Mayor (2026–32): Véronique Royer-Lucotte
- Area^{1}: 9.98 km^{2} (3.85 sq mi)
- Elevation: 125 m (410 ft)
- Highest elevation: 178 m (584 ft)
- Lowest elevation: 90 m (300 ft)
- Population (2023): 951
  - Density: 95.3/km^{2} (247/sq mi)
- Time zone: UTC+01:00 (CET)
  - Summer (DST): UTC+02:00 (CEST)
- INSEE/Postal code: 78020 /78790
- ^{1} French Land Register data, which excludes lakes, ponds, glaciers > 1 km^{2} (0.386 sq mi or 247 acres) and river estuaries.

Arnouville-lès-Mantes (French pronunciation: [aʁnuvil lɛ mɑ̃t]) is a commune in the Yvelines department in north-central France.

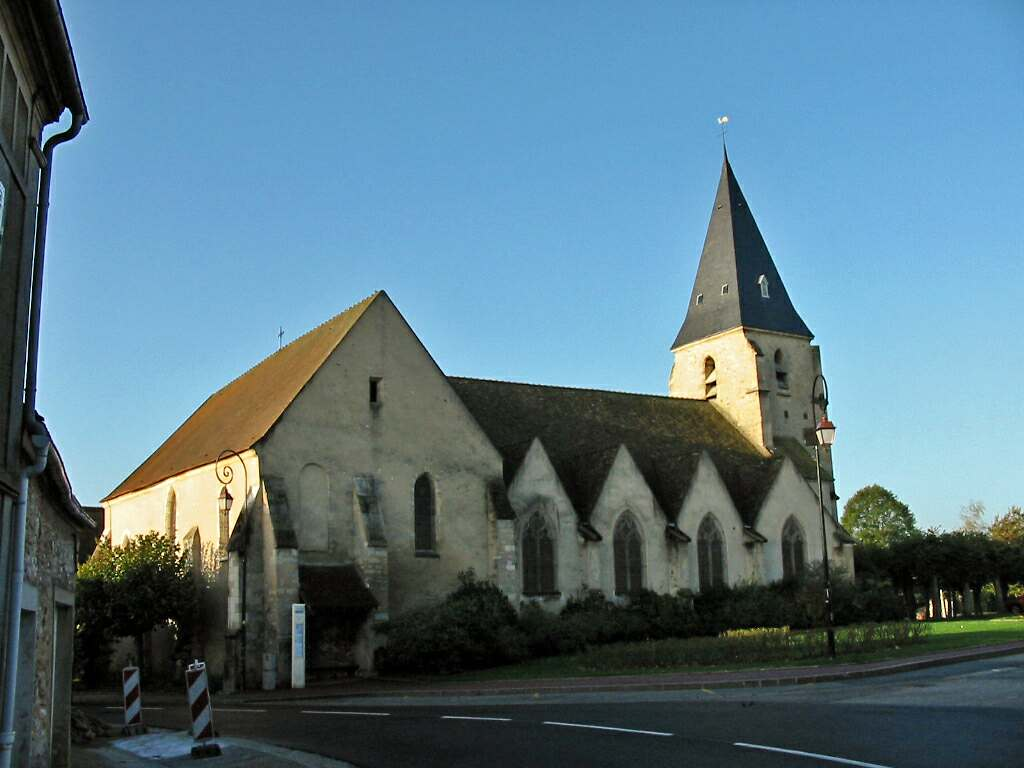

== Population ==
Historical population
Year	Pop.	±% p.a.
1968	450	—
1975	508	+1.75%
1982	551	+1.17%
1990	699	+3.02%
1999	742	+0.67%
2007	816	+1.20%
2012	876	+1.43%
2017	938	+1.38%
2023	951	+0.23%
Source: INSEE

== See also ==
- Communes of the Yvelines department
