= Guerville, Yvelines =

Guerville
- Commune
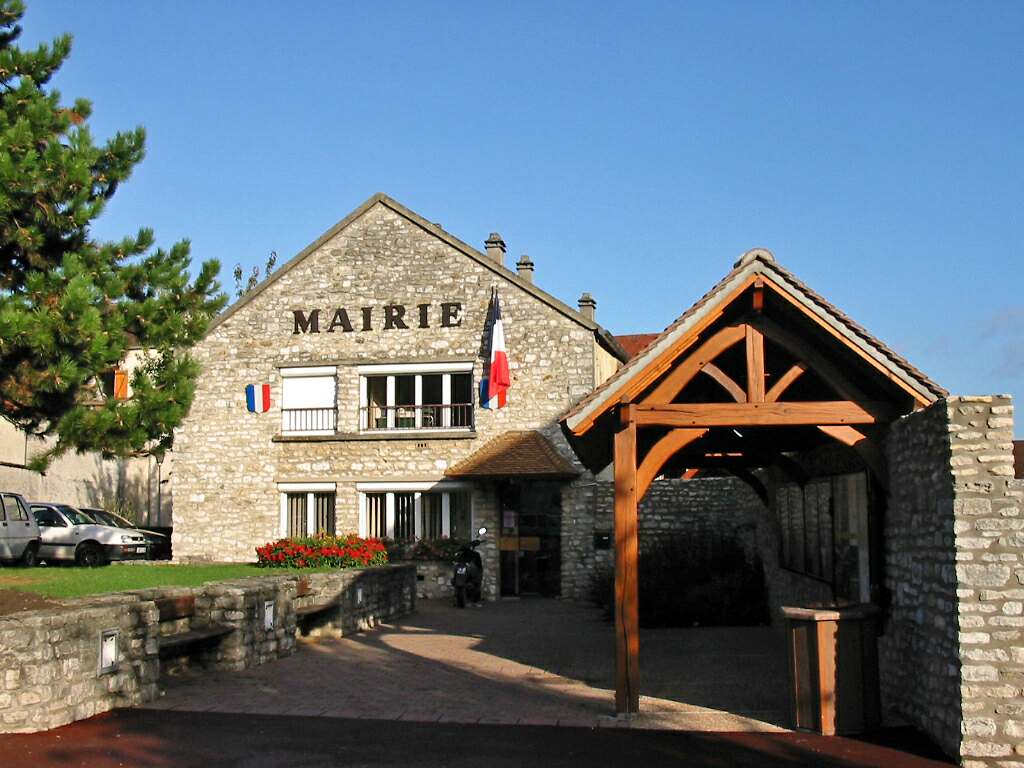
- The town hall in Guerville

- Coat of arms
- Location of Guerville
- Location within France Location within Île-de-France (region)
- Coordinates: 48°56′41″N 1°44′09″E
- Country: France
- Region: Île-de-France
- Department: Yvelines
- Arrondissement: Mantes-la-Jolie
- Canton: Bonnières-sur-Seine
- Intercommunality: CU Grand Paris Seine et Oise

Government
  - Mayor (2020–2026): Evelyne Placet
- Area^{1}: 9.98 km^{2} (3.85 sq mi)
- Elevation: 81 m (266 ft)
- Highest elevation: 148 m (486 ft)
- Lowest elevation: 17 m (56 ft)
- Population (2023): 2,052
  - Density: 206/km^{2} (533/sq mi)
- Time zone: UTC+01:00 (CET)
  - Summer (DST): UTC+02:00 (CEST)
- INSEE/Postal code: 78291 /78930
- ^{1} French Land Register data, which excludes lakes, ponds, glaciers > 1 km^{2} (0.386 sq mi or 247 acres) and river estuaries.

Guerville (French pronunciation: [ɡɛʁvil]) is a commune in the Yvelines department in the Île-de-France region in north-central France.

== History ==
Henri, count of Guerville, went to Jerusalem on crusade in the 12th century. On his return he established the priory of Secqueval, of which only ruins of the chapel remain. One holder of the title served under Louis XIV, as the head of royal hunting (the "Grand Écuyer of France"). At the time of the French revolution, the last male heir fled to London where his wife died. He returned to France with his two daughters and was buried in Ferrières-en-Gâtinais.

== Population ==
Historical population
Year	Pop.	±% p.a.
1968	1,360	—
1975	1,754	+3.70%
1982	1,644	−0.92%
1990	1,898	+1.81%
1999	1,899	+0.01%
2007	1,997	+0.63%
2012	2,139	+1.38%
2017	2,144	+0.05%
2023	2,052	−0.73%
Source: INSEE

== See also ==
- Communes of the Yvelines department
