= Drocourt, Yvelines =

Drocourt
- Commune
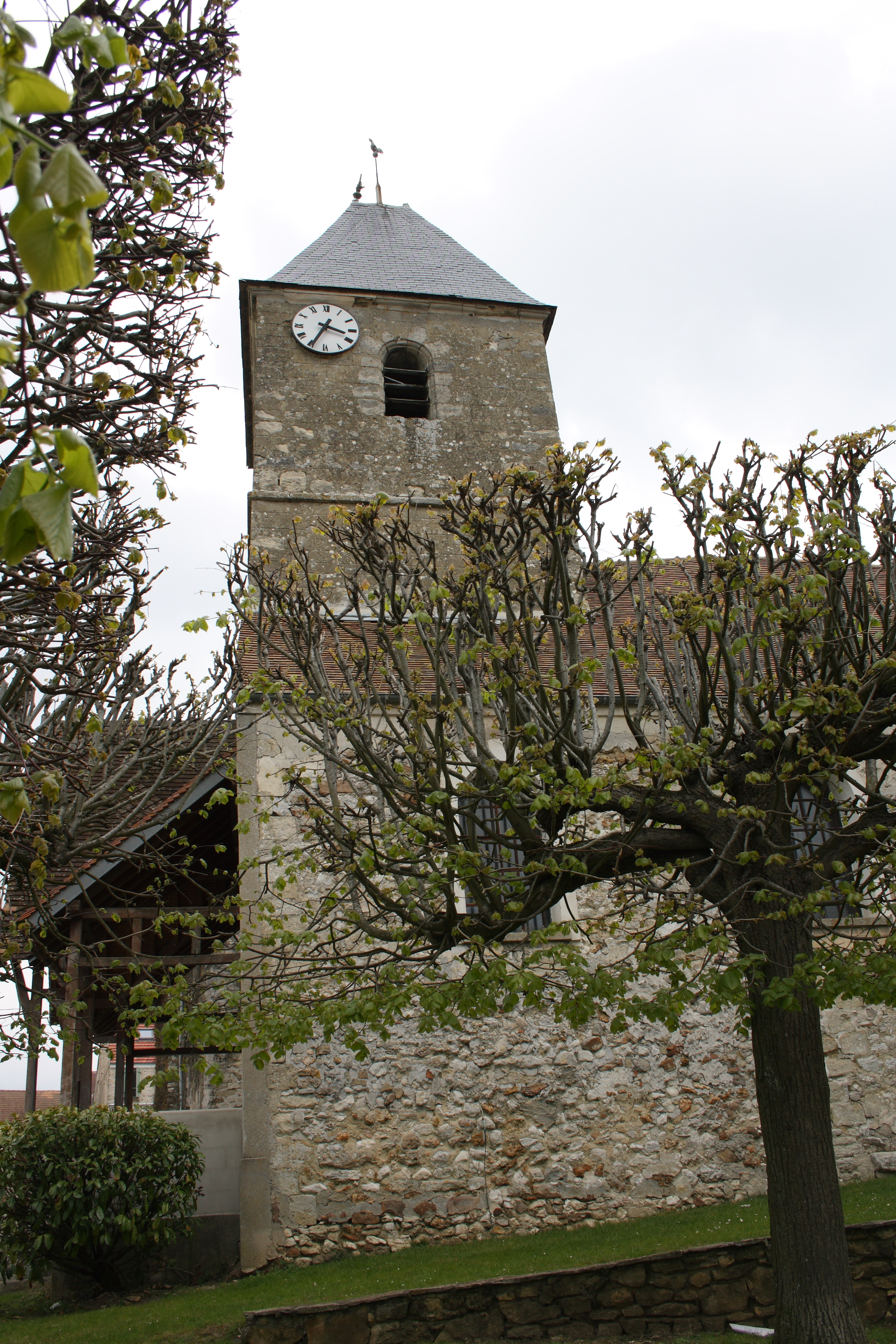
- The church of Saint-Denis, in Drocourt
- Location of Drocourt
- Location within France Location within Île-de-France (region)
- Coordinates: 49°03′28″N 1°46′00″E
- Country: France
- Region: Île-de-France
- Department: Yvelines
- Arrondissement: Mantes-la-Jolie
- Canton: Limay
- Intercommunality: CU Grand Paris Seine et Oise

Government
  - Mayor (2020–2026): Dominique Pierret
- Area^{1}: 3.84 km^{2} (1.48 sq mi)
- Elevation: 154 m (505 ft)
- Highest elevation: 172 m (564 ft)
- Lowest elevation: 103 m (338 ft)
- Population (2023): 554
  - Density: 144/km^{2} (374/sq mi)
- Time zone: UTC+01:00 (CET)
  - Summer (DST): UTC+02:00 (CEST)
- INSEE/Postal code: 78202 /78440
- ^{1} French Land Register data, which excludes lakes, ponds, glaciers > 1 km^{2} (0.386 sq mi or 247 acres) and river estuaries.

Drocourt (French pronunciation: [dʁɔkuʁ]) is a commune in the Yvelines department in the Île-de-France in north-central France.

== See also ==
- Communes of the Yvelines department
