= Goussonville =

- Commune
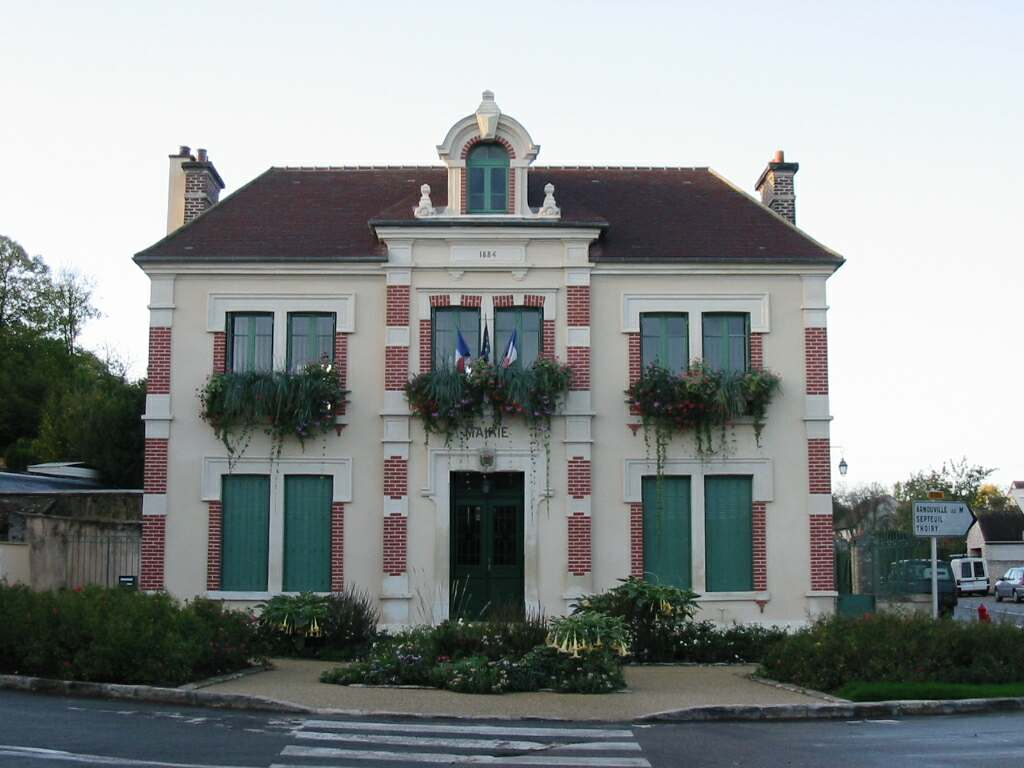
- Town hall

- Coat of arms
- Location of Goussonville
- Location within France Location within Île-de-France (region)
- Coordinates: 48°55′14″N 1°45′56″E
- Country: France
- Region: Île-de-France
- Department: Yvelines
- Arrondissement: Mantes-la-Jolie
- Canton: Bonnières-sur-Seine
- Intercommunality: CU Grand Paris Seine et Oise

Government
  - Mayor (2020–2026): Fabrice Lepinte
- Area^{1}: 4.66 km^{2} (1.80 sq mi)
- Elevation: 150 m (490 ft)
- Highest elevation: 138 m (453 ft)
- Lowest elevation: 59 m (194 ft)
- Population (2023): 650
  - Density: 140/km^{2} (360/sq mi)
- Time zone: UTC+01:00 (CET)
  - Summer (DST): UTC+02:00 (CEST)
- INSEE/Postal code: 78281 /78930
- ^{1} French Land Register data, which excludes lakes, ponds, glaciers > 1 km^{2} (0.386 sq mi or 247 acres) and river estuaries.

Goussonville (French pronunciation: [ɡusɔ̃vil]) is a commune in the Yvelines department in the Île-de-France region in north-central France.

== See also ==
- Communes of the Yvelines department
