= Mézières-sur-Seine =

- Commune
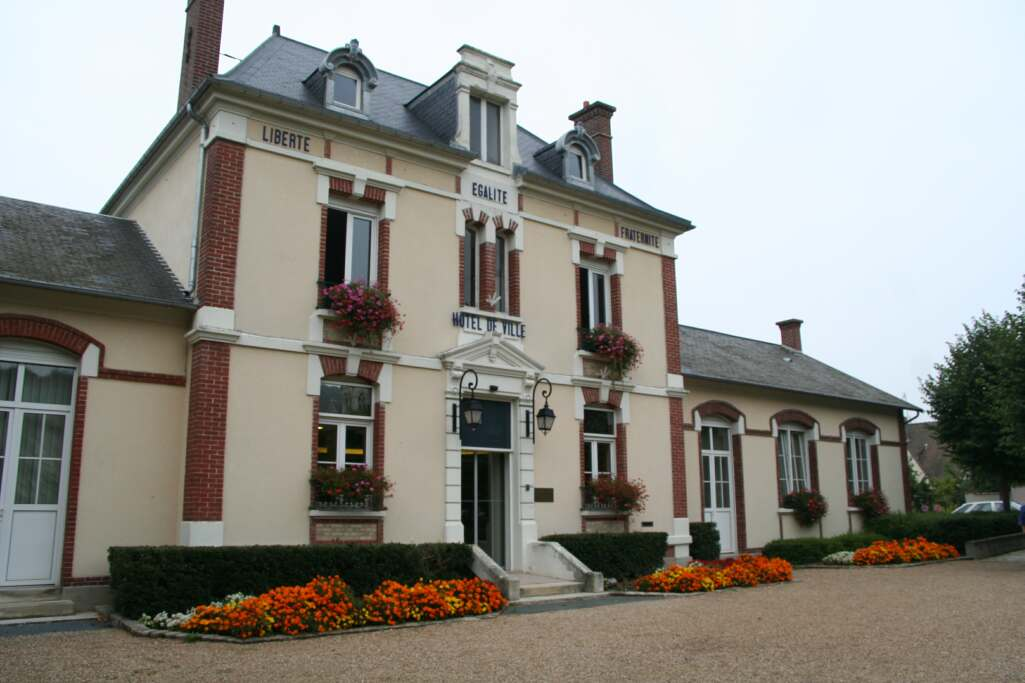
- Town hall
- Location of Mézières-sur-Seine
- Location within France Location within Île-de-France (region)
- Coordinates: 48°57′32″N 1°48′17″E
- Country: France
- Region: Île-de-France
- Department: Yvelines
- Arrondissement: Mantes-la-Jolie
- Canton: Limay
- Intercommunality: CU Grand Paris Seine et Oise

Government
  - Mayor (2020–2026): Franck Fontaine
- Area^{1}: 10.42 km^{2} (4.02 sq mi)
- Elevation: 22 m (72 ft)
- Highest elevation: 156 m (512 ft)
- Lowest elevation: 17 m (56 ft)
- Population (2023): 3,923
  - Density: 376.5/km^{2} (975.1/sq mi)
- Time zone: UTC+01:00 (CET)
  - Summer (DST): UTC+02:00 (CEST)
- INSEE/Postal code: 78402 /78970
- ^{1} French Land Register data, which excludes lakes, ponds, glaciers > 1 km^{2} (0.386 sq mi or 247 acres) and river estuaries.

Mézières-sur-Seine (French pronunciation: [mezjɛʁ syʁ sɛn], literally Mézières on Seine) is a commune in the Yvelines department in the Île-de-France region in north-central France. It is located in the western suburbs of Paris, near the bank of the Seine 47 km (29 mi) west of Paris.

The name of the commune comes from the Latin word: maceria, meaning walls.

== Population ==
Historical population
| Year | Pop. | ±% p.a. |
|---|---|---|
| 1968 | 1,771 | — |
| 1975 | 1,968 | +1.52% |
| 1982 | 2,124 | +1.10% |
| 1990 | 2,726 | +3.17% |
| 1999 | 3,341 | +2.29% |
| 2007 | 3,485 | +0.53% |
| 2012 | 3,587 | +0.58% |
| 2017 | 3,676 | +0.49% |
| 2023 | 3,923 | +1.09% |
Source: INSEE

== Sites of interest ==
Saint-Nicolas church, built in the 13th century in Gothic style. A choir was added since the 17th century. It is a listed monument since 1931.

== See also ==
- Communes of the Yvelines department
