= Mondreville =

Mondreville is the name of two communes in France:

- Mondreville, in the Seine-et-Marne département
- Mondreville, in the Yvelines département
