= Osmoy =

Osmoy may refer to the following places in France:

- Osmoy, Cher, a commune in the department of Cher
- Osmoy, Yvelines, a commune in the department of Yvelines
- Osmoy-Saint-Valery, a commune in the department of Seine-Maritime
