= René Hubert =

René Hubert may refer to:

- René Hubert (historian)
- René Hubert (costume designer)
