= Orgerus =

- Commune
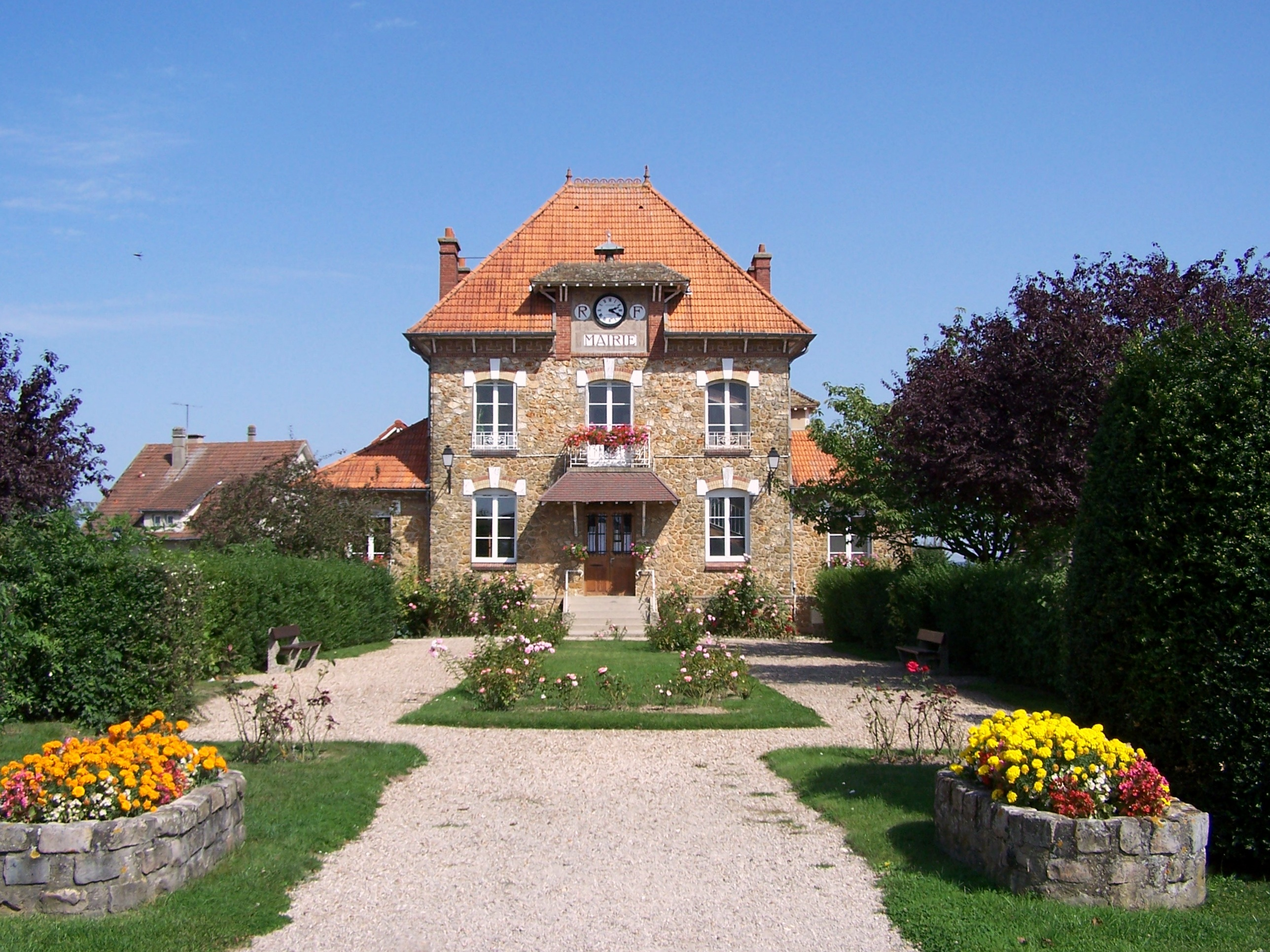
- Town hall

- Coat of arms
- Location of Orgerus
- Location within France Location within Île-de-France (region)
- Coordinates: 48°50′24″N 1°42′05″E
- Country: France
- Region: Île-de-France
- Department: Yvelines
- Arrondissement: Mantes-la-Jolie
- Canton: Bonnières-sur-Seine

Government
  - Mayor (2020–2026): Jean-Michel Verplaetse
- Area^{1}: 14.34 km^{2} (5.54 sq mi)
- Elevation: 100 m (330 ft)
- Highest elevation: 186 m (610 ft)
- Lowest elevation: 77 m (253 ft)
- Population (2023): 2,489
  - Density: 173.6/km^{2} (449.5/sq mi)
- Time zone: UTC+01:00 (CET)
  - Summer (DST): UTC+02:00 (CEST)
- INSEE/Postal code: 78465 /78910
- ^{1} French Land Register data, which excludes lakes, ponds, glaciers > 1 km^{2} (0.386 sq mi or 247 acres) and river estuaries.

Orgerus (French pronunciation: [ɔʁʒəʁys]) is a commune in the Yvelines department in the Île-de-France region of northern France.

== Population ==
Historical population
Year	Pop.	±% p.a.
1968	1,012	—
1975	1,457	+5.34%
1982	2,004	+4.66%
1990	2,184	+1.08%
1999	2,245	+0.31%
2007	2,336	+0.50%
2012	2,340	+0.03%
2017	2,370	+0.26%
2023	2,489	+0.82%
Source: INSEE

== See also ==
- Communes of the Yvelines department
