= Mulcent =

- Commune
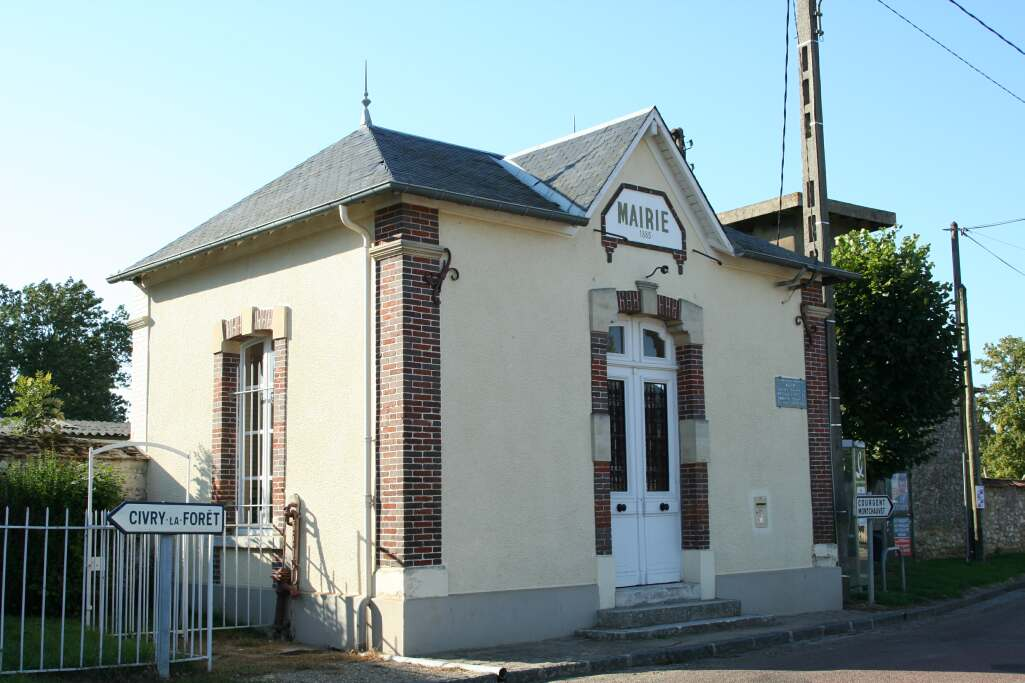
- Town hall
- Location of Mulcent
- Location within France Location within Île-de-France (region)
- Coordinates: 48°52′47″N 1°39′09″E
- Country: France
- Region: Île-de-France
- Department: Yvelines
- Arrondissement: Mantes-la-Jolie
- Canton: Bonnières-sur-Seine
- Intercommunality: Pays houdanais

Government
  - Mayor (2020–2026): Guy Pélard
- Area^{1}: 3.54 km^{2} (1.37 sq mi)
- Elevation: 110 m (360 ft)
- Highest elevation: 131 m (430 ft)
- Lowest elevation: 67 m (220 ft)
- Population (2023): 128
  - Density: 36.2/km^{2} (93.6/sq mi)
- Time zone: UTC+01:00 (CET)
  - Summer (DST): UTC+02:00 (CEST)
- INSEE/Postal code: 78439 /78790
- ^{1} French Land Register data, which excludes lakes, ponds, glaciers > 1 km^{2} (0.386 sq mi or 247 acres) and river estuaries.

Mulcent (French pronunciation: [mylsɑ̃]) is a commune in the Yvelines department in the Île-de-France region in north-central France.

== See also ==
- Communes of the Yvelines department
