= Canton of Bonnières-sur-Seine =

Coordinates: 49.03°N 1.58°E

The canton of Bonnières-sur-Seine is an administrative division of the Yvelines department, northern France. Its borders were modified at the French canton reorganisation which came into effect in March 2015. Its seat is in Bonnières-sur-Seine.

It consists of the following communes:

1. Adainville
2. Arnouville-lès-Mantes
3. Auffreville-Brasseuil
4. Bazainville
5. Bennecourt
6. Blaru
7. Boinville-en-Mantois
8. Boinvilliers
9. Boissets
10. Boissy-Mauvoisin
11. Bonnières-sur-Seine
12. Bourdonné
13. Breuil-Bois-Robert
14. Bréval
15. Chaufour-lès-Bonnières
16. Civry-la-Forêt
17. Condé-sur-Vesgre
18. Courgent
19. Cravent
20. Dammartin-en-Serve
21. Dannemarie
22. Favrieux
23. Flacourt
24. Flins-Neuve-Église
25. Fontenay-Mauvoisin
26. Freneuse
27. Gommecourt
28. Goussonville
29. Grandchamp
30. Gressey
31. Guerville
32. Hargeville
33. La Hauteville
34. Houdan
35. Jouy-Mauvoisin
36. Jumeauville
37. Limetz-Villez
38. Lommoye
39. Longnes
40. Maulette
41. Ménerville
42. Méricourt
43. Moisson
44. Mondreville
45. Montchauvet
46. Mousseaux-sur-Seine
47. Mulcent
48. Neauphlette
49. Notre-Dame-de-la-Mer
50. Orgerus
51. Orvilliers
52. Osmoy
53. Perdreauville
54. Prunay-le-Temple
55. Richebourg
56. Rolleboise
57. Rosay
58. Saint-Illiers-la-Ville
59. Saint-Illiers-le-Bois
60. Saint-Martin-des-Champs
61. Septeuil
62. Soindres
63. Tacoignières
64. Le Tartre-Gaudran
65. Le Tertre-Saint-Denis
66. Tilly
67. Vert
68. La Villeneuve-en-Chevrie
69. Villette
