= Saint-Illiers-le-Bois =

- Commune
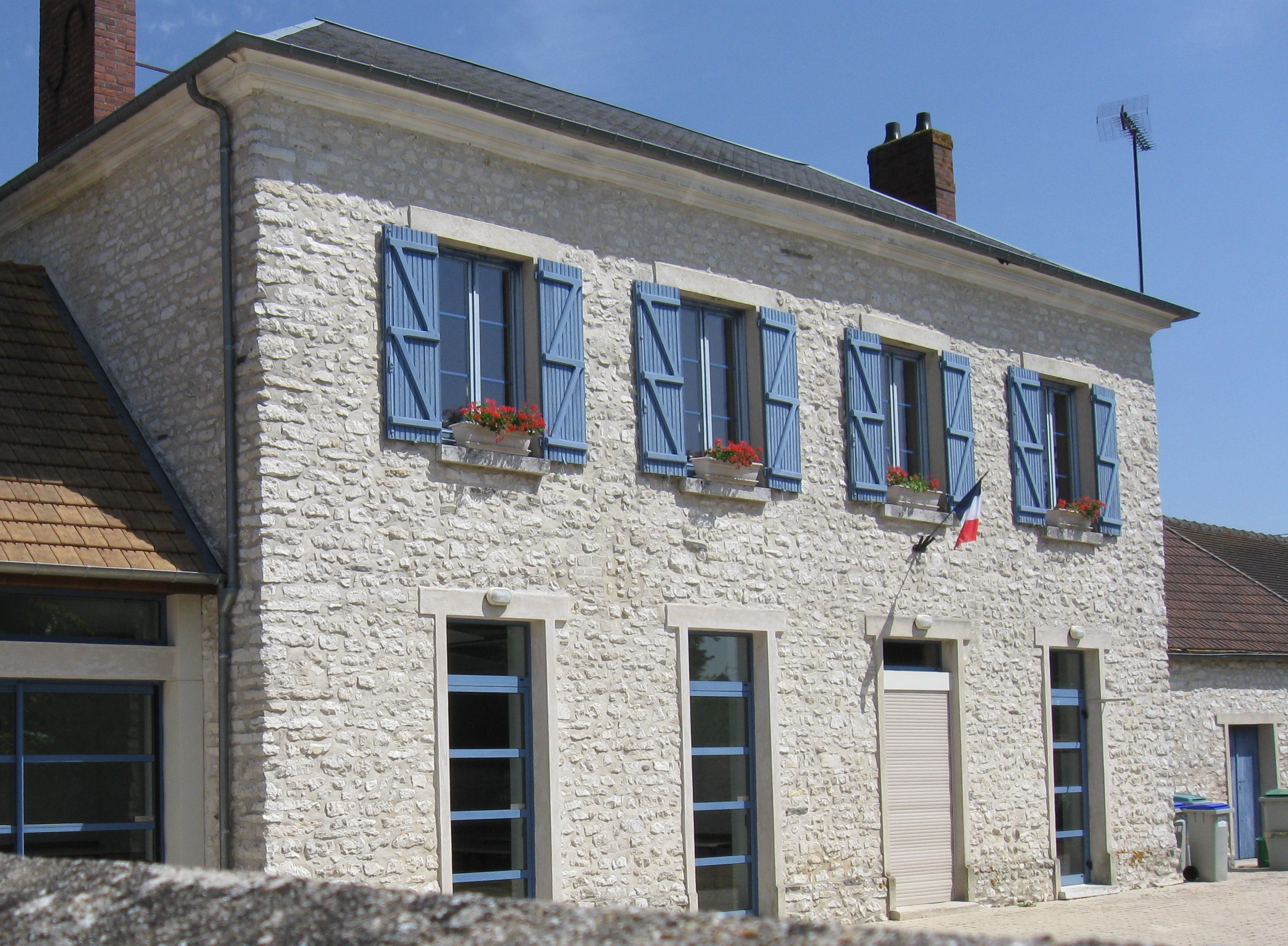
- Saint-Illiers-le-Bois Town hall
- Location of Saint-Illiers-le-Bois
- Location within France Location within Île-de-France (region)
- Coordinates: 49°02′59″N 1°30′29″E
- Country: France
- Region: Île-de-France
- Department: Yvelines
- Arrondissement: Mantes-la-Jolie
- Canton: Bonnières-sur-Seine

Government
  - Mayor (2020–2026): Christine Noël
- Area^{1}: 4.39 km^{2} (1.69 sq mi)
- Elevation: 142 m (466 ft)
- Highest elevation: 166 m (545 ft)
- Lowest elevation: 129 m (423 ft)
- Population (2023): 449
  - Density: 102/km^{2} (265/sq mi)
- Time zone: UTC+01:00 (CET)
  - Summer (DST): UTC+02:00 (CEST)
- INSEE/Postal code: 78559 /78980
- ^{1} French Land Register data, which excludes lakes, ponds, glaciers > 1 km^{2} (0.386 sq mi or 247 acres) and river estuaries.

Saint-Illiers-le-Bois (French pronunciation: [sɛ̃t‿ilje lə bwa]) is a commune in the Yvelines department in the Île-de-France region in north-central France.

== See also ==
- Communes of the Yvelines department
