= Bourdonné =

- Commune
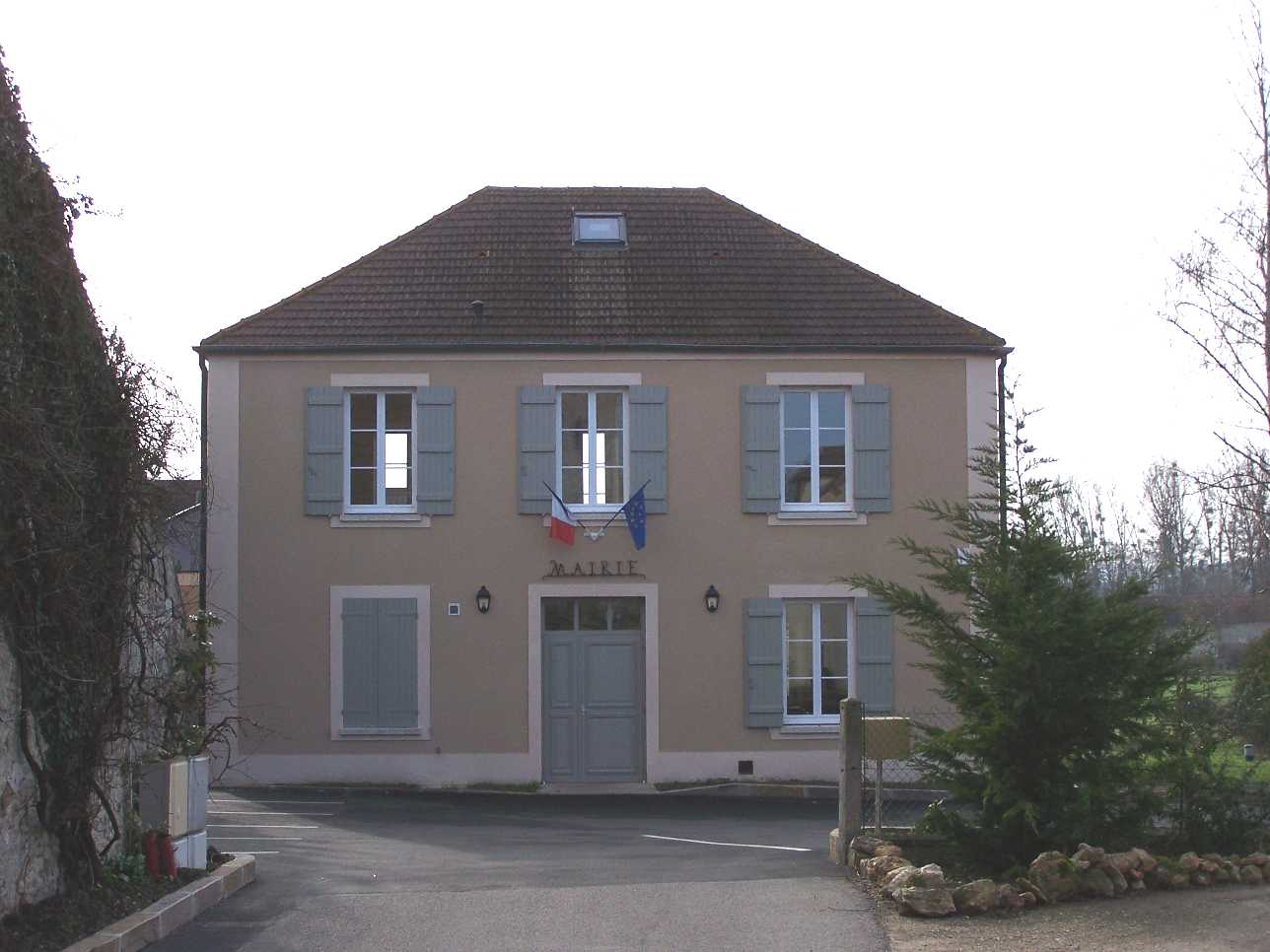
- Town hall

- Coat of arms
- Location of Bourdonné
- Location within France Location within Île-de-France (region)
- Coordinates: 48°45′24″N 1°39′51″E
- Country: France
- Region: Île-de-France
- Department: Yvelines
- Arrondissement: Mantes-la-Jolie
- Canton: Bonnières-sur-Seine

Government
  - Mayor (2020–2026): Sylvain Rouland
- Area^{1}: 10.76 km^{2} (4.15 sq mi)
- Elevation: 110 m (360 ft)
- Highest elevation: 178 m (584 ft)
- Lowest elevation: 102 m (335 ft)
- Population (2023): 506
  - Density: 47.0/km^{2} (122/sq mi)
- Time zone: UTC+01:00 (CET)
  - Summer (DST): UTC+02:00 (CEST)
- INSEE/Postal code: 78096 /78113
- ^{1} French Land Register data, which excludes lakes, ponds, glaciers > 1 km^{2} (0.386 sq mi or 247 acres) and river estuaries.

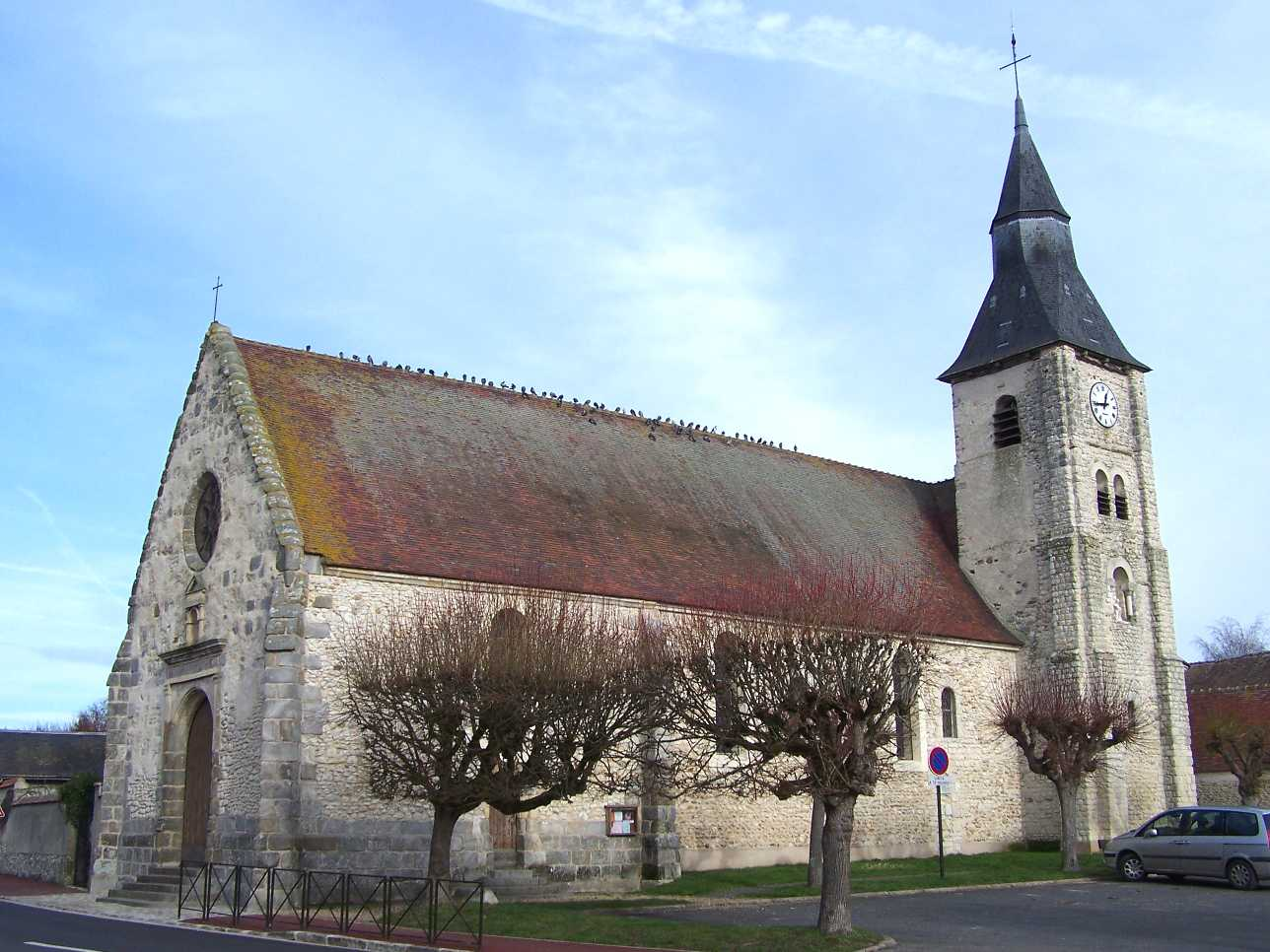
Saint-Martin

Bourdonné (French pronunciation: [buʁdɔne]) is a commune in the Yvelines department in the Île-de-France region in north-central France.

== See also ==
- Communes of the Yvelines department
