= Boinvilliers =

- Commune
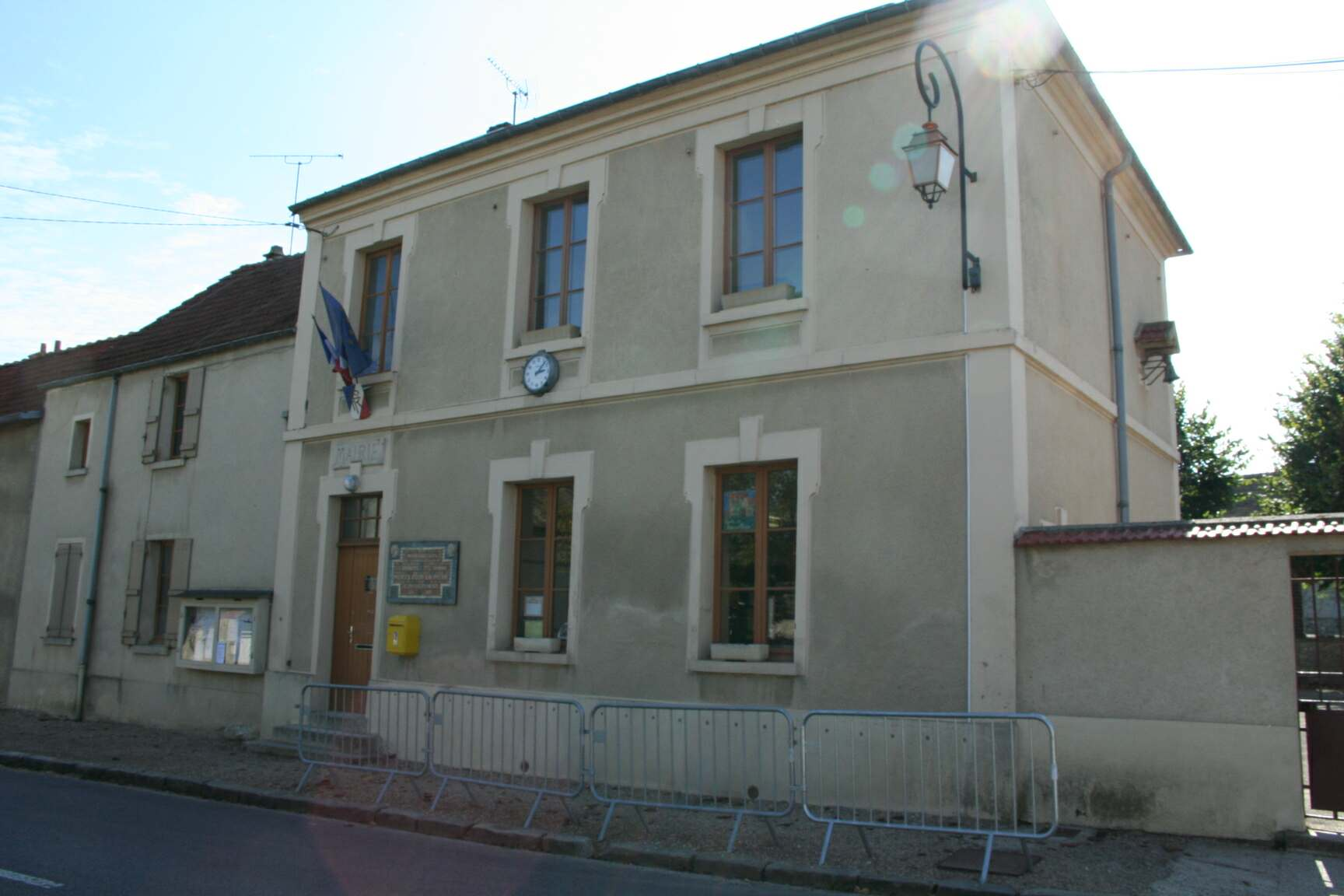
- Town hall

- Coat of arms
- Location of Boinvilliers
- Location within France Location within Île-de-France (region)
- Coordinates: 48°55′05″N 1°39′40″E
- Country: France
- Region: Île-de-France
- Department: Yvelines
- Arrondissement: Mantes-la-Jolie
- Canton: Bonnières-sur-Seine
- Intercommunality: Pays houdanais

Government
  - Mayor (2020–2026): Jacques Nedellec
- Area^{1}: 3.59 km^{2} (1.39 sq mi)
- Elevation: 125 m (410 ft)
- Highest elevation: 151 m (495 ft)
- Lowest elevation: 75 m (246 ft)
- Population (2023): 243
  - Density: 67.7/km^{2} (175/sq mi)
- Time zone: UTC+01:00 (CET)
  - Summer (DST): UTC+02:00 (CEST)
- INSEE/Postal code: 78072 /78200
- ^{1} French Land Register data, which excludes lakes, ponds, glaciers > 1 km^{2} (0.386 sq mi or 247 acres) and river estuaries.

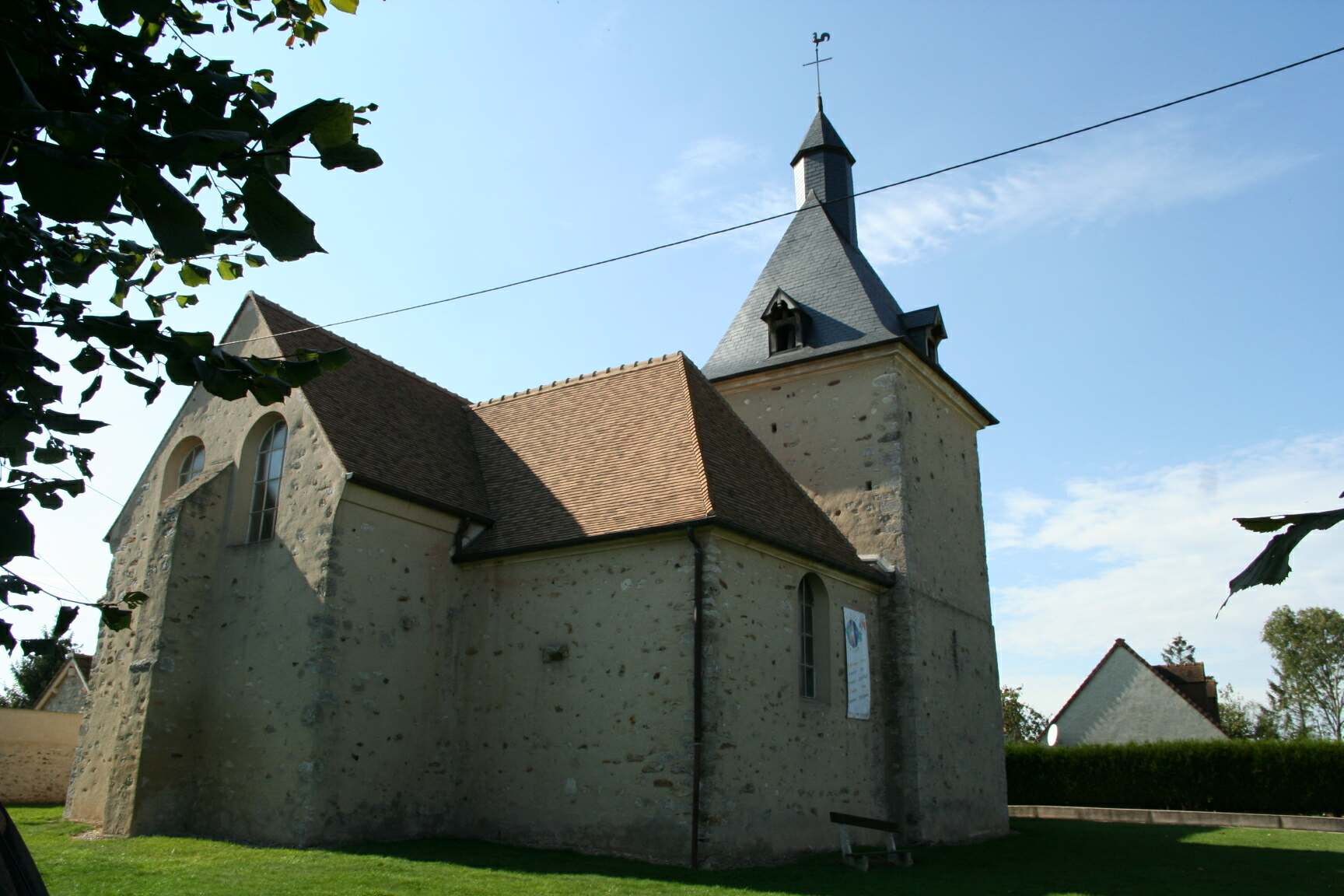
Saint-Clément-et-Jean-Baptiste

Boinvilliers (French pronunciation: [bwɛ̃vilje]) is a commune in the Yvelines department in north-central France.

== See also ==
- Communes of the Yvelines department
