= Grandchamp, Yvelines =

Grandchamp
- Commune
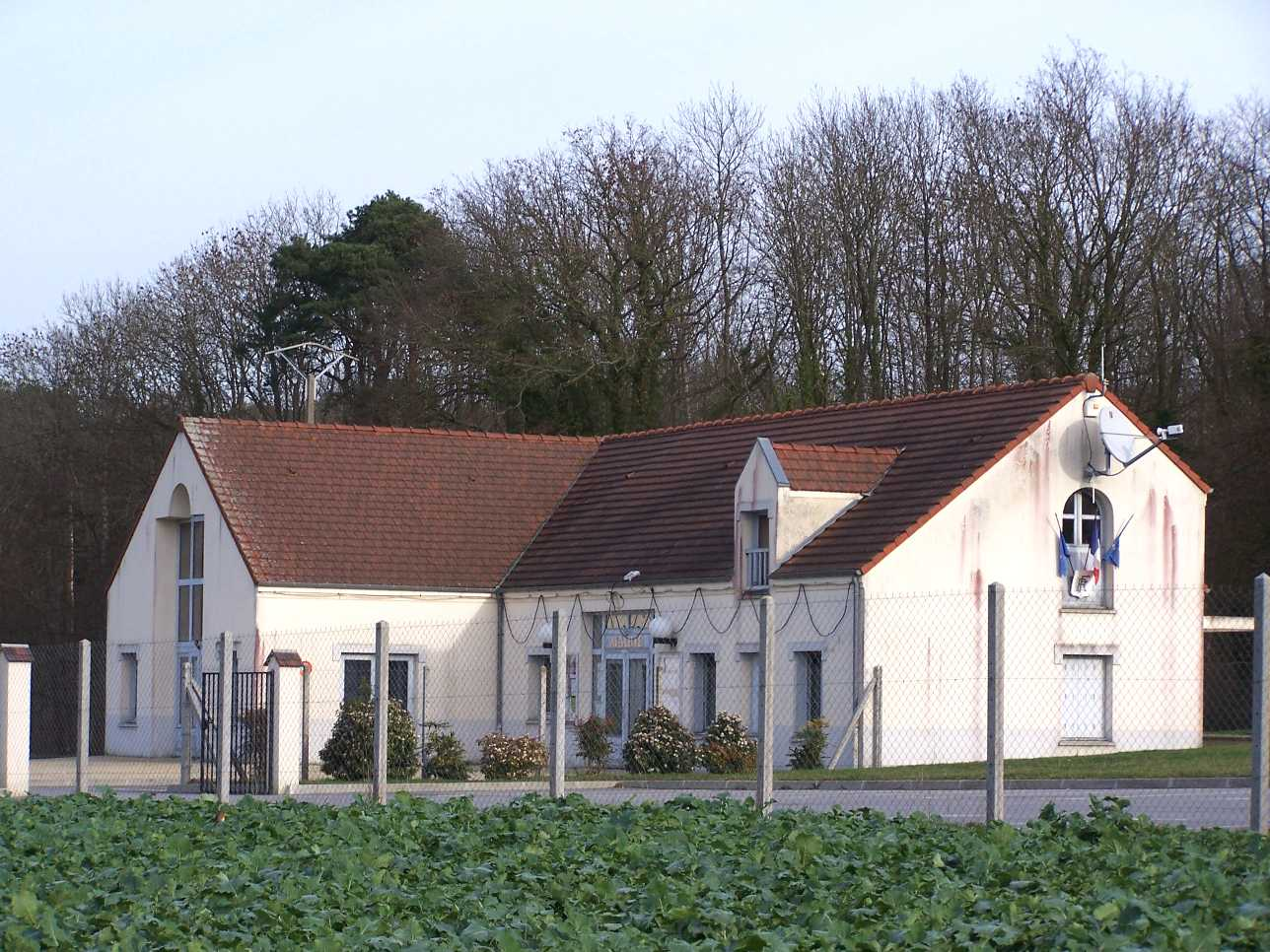
- Town hall

- Coat of arms
- Location of Grandchamp
- Location within France Location within Île-de-France (region)
- Coordinates: 48°42′30″N 1°36′07″E
- Country: France
- Region: Île-de-France
- Department: Yvelines
- Arrondissement: Mantes-la-Jolie
- Canton: Bonnières-sur-Seine
- Intercommunality: Pays Houdanais

Government
  - Mayor (2020–2026): Hervé Renauld
- Area^{1}: 6.05 km^{2} (2.34 sq mi)
- Elevation: 107 m (351 ft)
- Highest elevation: 183 m (600 ft)
- Lowest elevation: 123 m (404 ft)
- Population (2023): 300
  - Density: 50/km^{2} (130/sq mi)
- Time zone: UTC+01:00 (CET)
  - Summer (DST): UTC+02:00 (CEST)
- INSEE/Postal code: 78283 /78113
- ^{1} French Land Register data, which excludes lakes, ponds, glaciers > 1 km^{2} (0.386 sq mi or 247 acres) and river estuaries.

Grandchamp (French pronunciation: [ɡʁɑ̃ʃɑ̃]) is a commune in the Yvelines department in the Île-de-France region in north-central France.

== See also ==
- Communes of the Yvelines department
