= Tacoignières =

- Commune
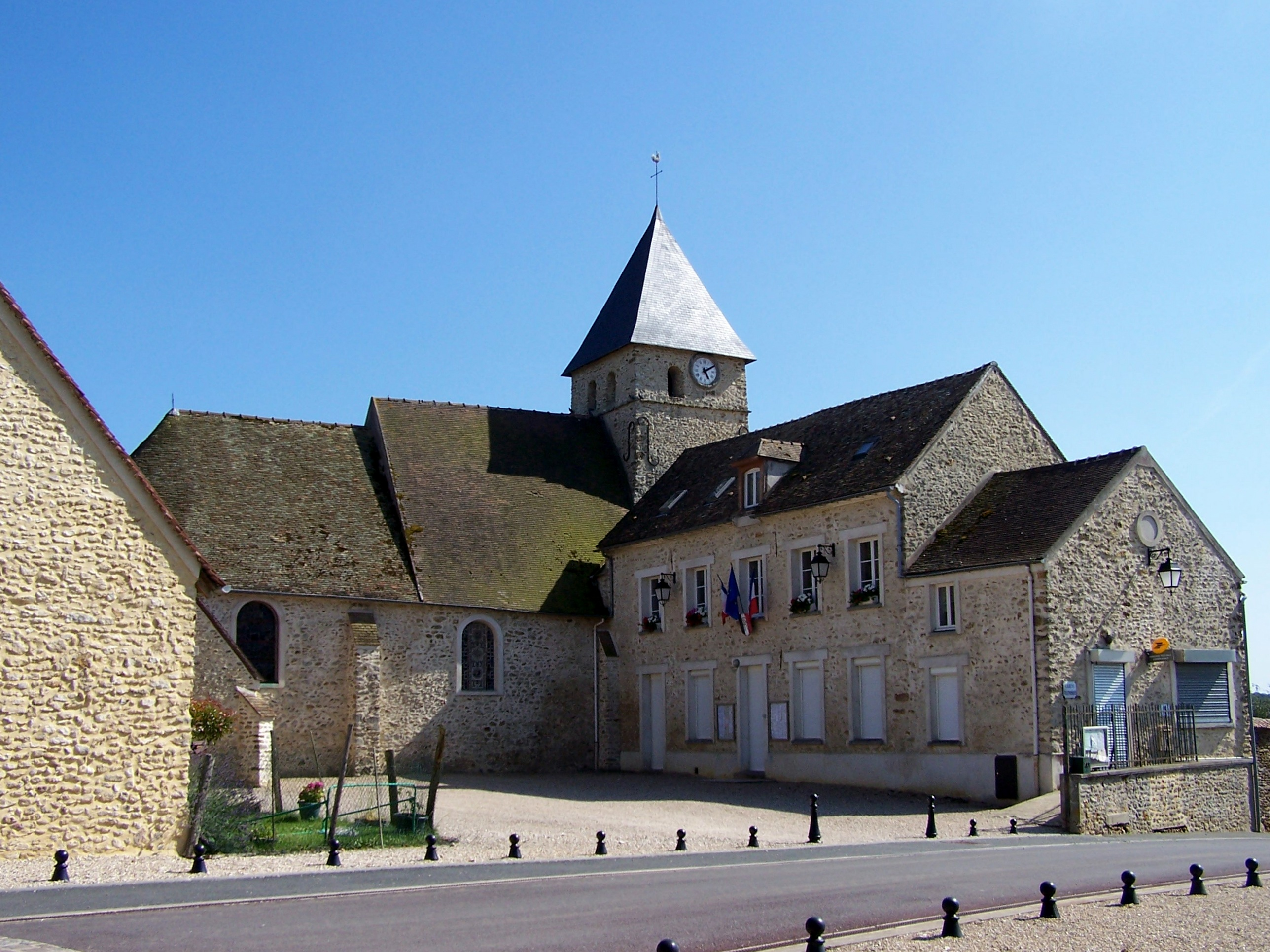
- Town hall

- Coat of arms
- Location of Tacoignières
- Location within France Location within Île-de-France (region)
- Coordinates: 48°50′13″N 1°40′32″E
- Country: France
- Region: Île-de-France
- Department: Yvelines
- Arrondissement: Mantes-la-Jolie
- Canton: Bonnières-sur-Seine
- Intercommunality: Pays Houdanais

Government
  - Mayor (2020–2026): Patrice Le Bail
- Area^{1}: 3.17 km^{2} (1.22 sq mi)
- Highest elevation: 153 m (502 ft)
- Lowest elevation: 119 m (390 ft)
- Population (2023): 1,219
  - Density: 385/km^{2} (996/sq mi)
- Time zone: UTC+01:00 (CET)
  - Summer (DST): UTC+02:00 (CEST)
- INSEE/Postal code: 78605 /78910
- ^{1} French Land Register data, which excludes lakes, ponds, glaciers > 1 km^{2} (0.386 sq mi or 247 acres) and river estuaries.

Tacoignières (French pronunciation: [takwaɲɛʁ]) is a commune in the Yvelines department in the Île-de-France in north-central France.

== Population ==
Historical population
Year	Pop.	±% p.a.
1968	345	—
1975	512	+5.80%
1982	671	+3.94%
1990	778	+1.87%
1999	956	+2.32%
2007	1,027	+0.90%
2012	1,047	+0.39%
2017	1,034	−0.25%
2023	1,219	+2.78%
Source: INSEE

== See also ==
- Communes of the Yvelines department
