= Prunay-le-Temple =

- Commune
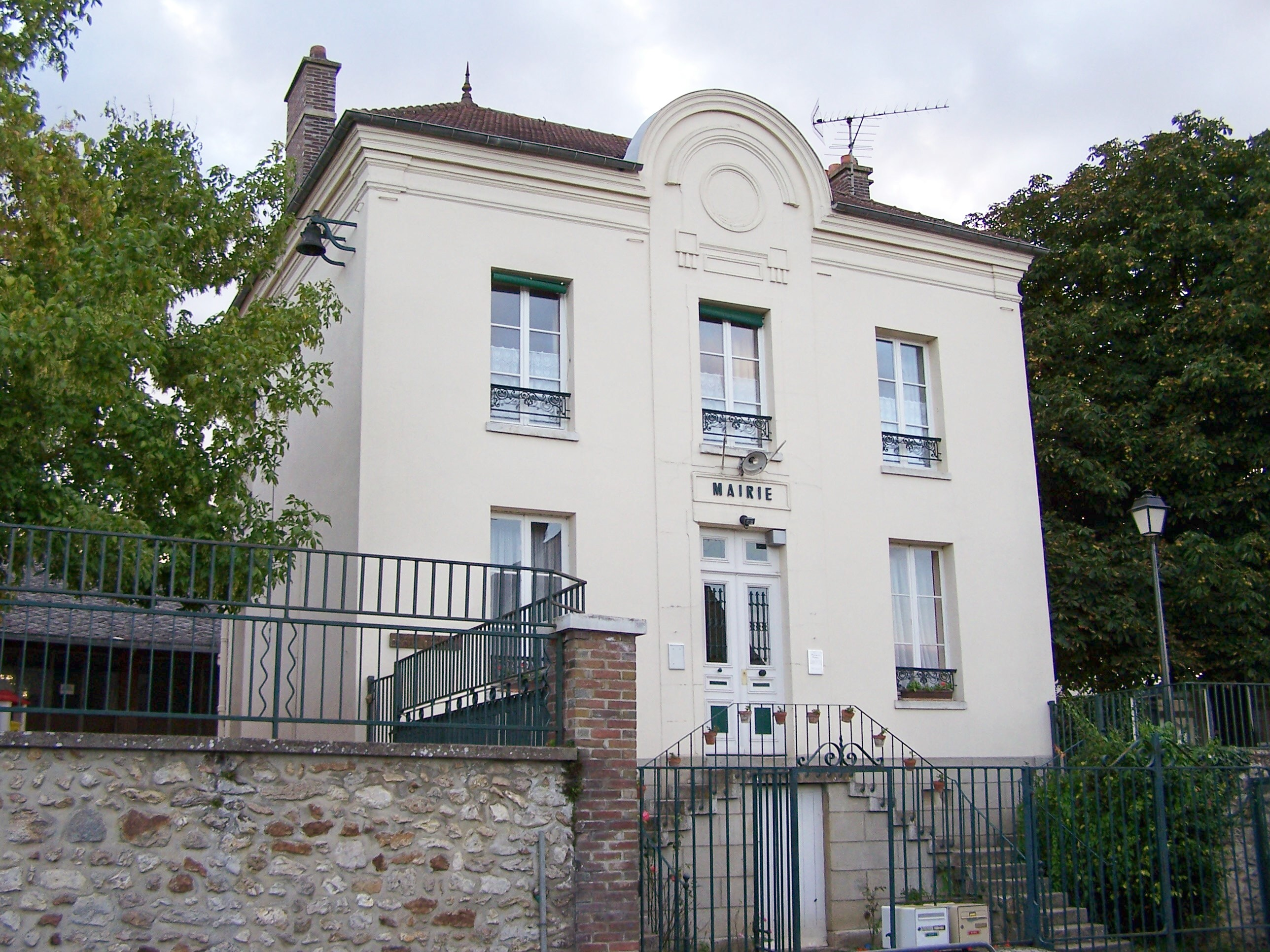
- Town hall
- Location of Prunay-le-Temple
- Location within France Location within Île-de-France (region)
- Coordinates: 48°51′43″N 1°40′28″E
- Country: France
- Region: Île-de-France
- Department: Yvelines
- Arrondissement: Mantes-la-Jolie
- Canton: Bonnières-sur-Seine
- Intercommunality: Pays houdanais

Government
  - Mayor (2020–2026): Jean Myotte
- Area^{1}: 6.77 km^{2} (2.61 sq mi)
- Elevation: 100 m (330 ft)
- Highest elevation: 153 m (502 ft)
- Lowest elevation: 67 m (220 ft)
- Population (2023): 409
  - Density: 60.4/km^{2} (156/sq mi)
- Time zone: UTC+01:00 (CET)
  - Summer (DST): UTC+02:00 (CEST)
- INSEE/Postal code: 78505 /78910
- Website: www.mairie-prunayletemple.fr
- ^{1} French Land Register data, which excludes lakes, ponds, glaciers > 1 km^{2} (0.386 sq mi or 247 acres) and river estuaries.

Prunay-le-Temple (French pronunciation: [pʁynɛ l(ə) tɑ̃pl]; lit. 'Prunay-the-Temple') is a rural commune in the Yvelines department in the Île-de-France region in northern France.

It covers about 6.7 km^{2} (2.6 sq mi) on the plateau of Mantois. Its altitude is generally between 100 and 130 metres, sloping slightly towards the north.

== See also ==
- Communes of the Yvelines department
