= Fontenay-Mauvoisin =

- Commune
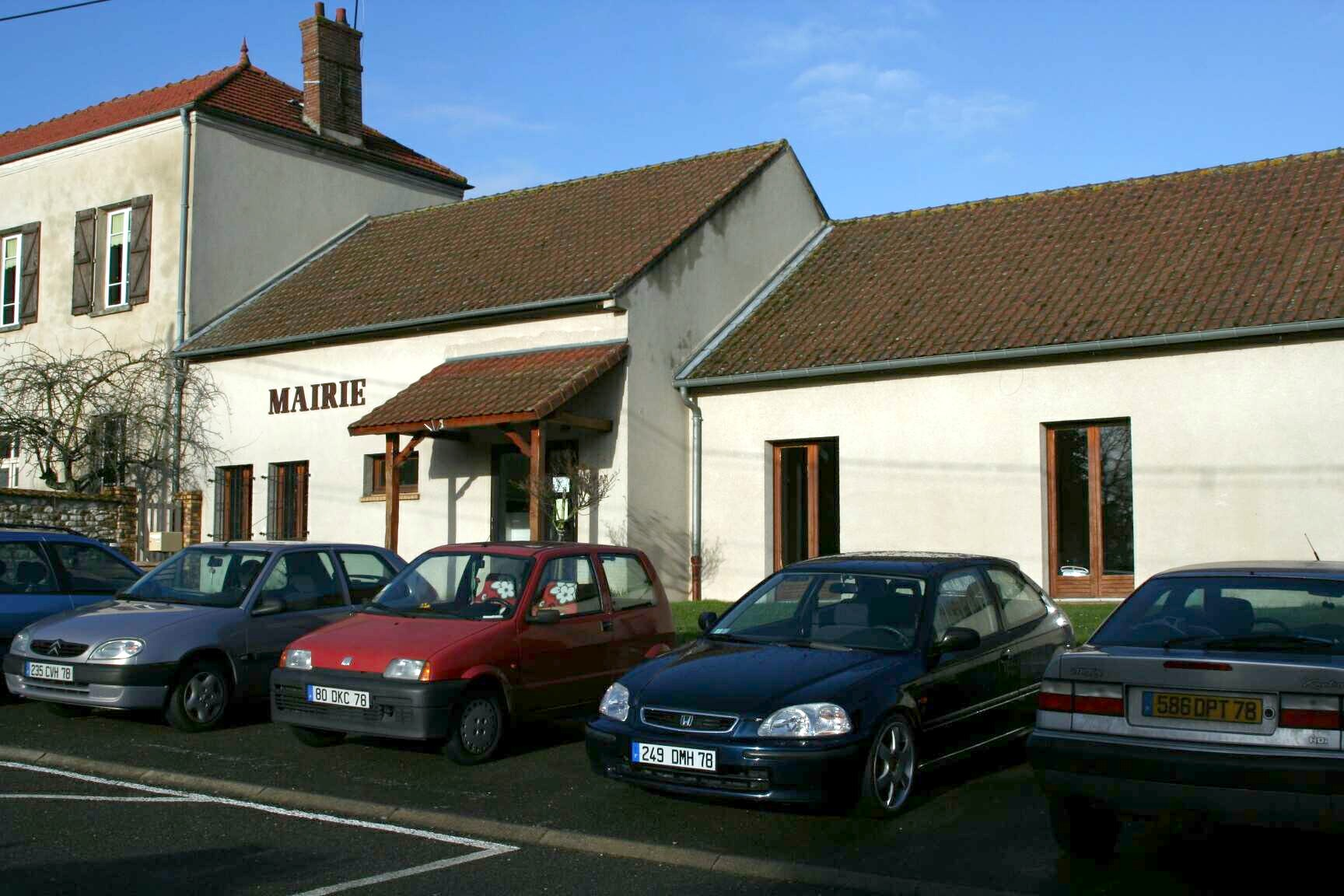
- Town hall
- Location of Fontenay-Mauvoisin
- Location within France Location within Île-de-France (region)
- Coordinates: 48°57′54″N 1°39′08″E
- Country: France
- Region: Île-de-France
- Department: Yvelines
- Arrondissement: Mantes-la-Jolie
- Canton: Bonnières-sur-Seine
- Intercommunality: CU Grand Paris Seine et Oise

Government
  - Mayor (2020–2026): Dominique Josseaume
- Area^{1}: 3.31 km^{2} (1.28 sq mi)
- Highest elevation: 152 m (499 ft)
- Lowest elevation: 79 m (259 ft)
- Population (2023): 460
  - Density: 140/km^{2} (360/sq mi)
- Time zone: UTC+01:00 (CET)
  - Summer (DST): UTC+02:00 (CEST)
- INSEE/Postal code: 78245 /78200
- ^{1} French Land Register data, which excludes lakes, ponds, glaciers > 1 km^{2} (0.386 sq mi or 247 acres) and river estuaries.

Fontenay-Mauvoisin (French pronunciation: [fɔ̃tnɛ movwazɛ̃]) is a commune in the Yvelines department in the Île-de-France in north-central France.

== See also ==
- Communes of the Yvelines department
