= Saint-Illiers-la-Ville =

- Commune
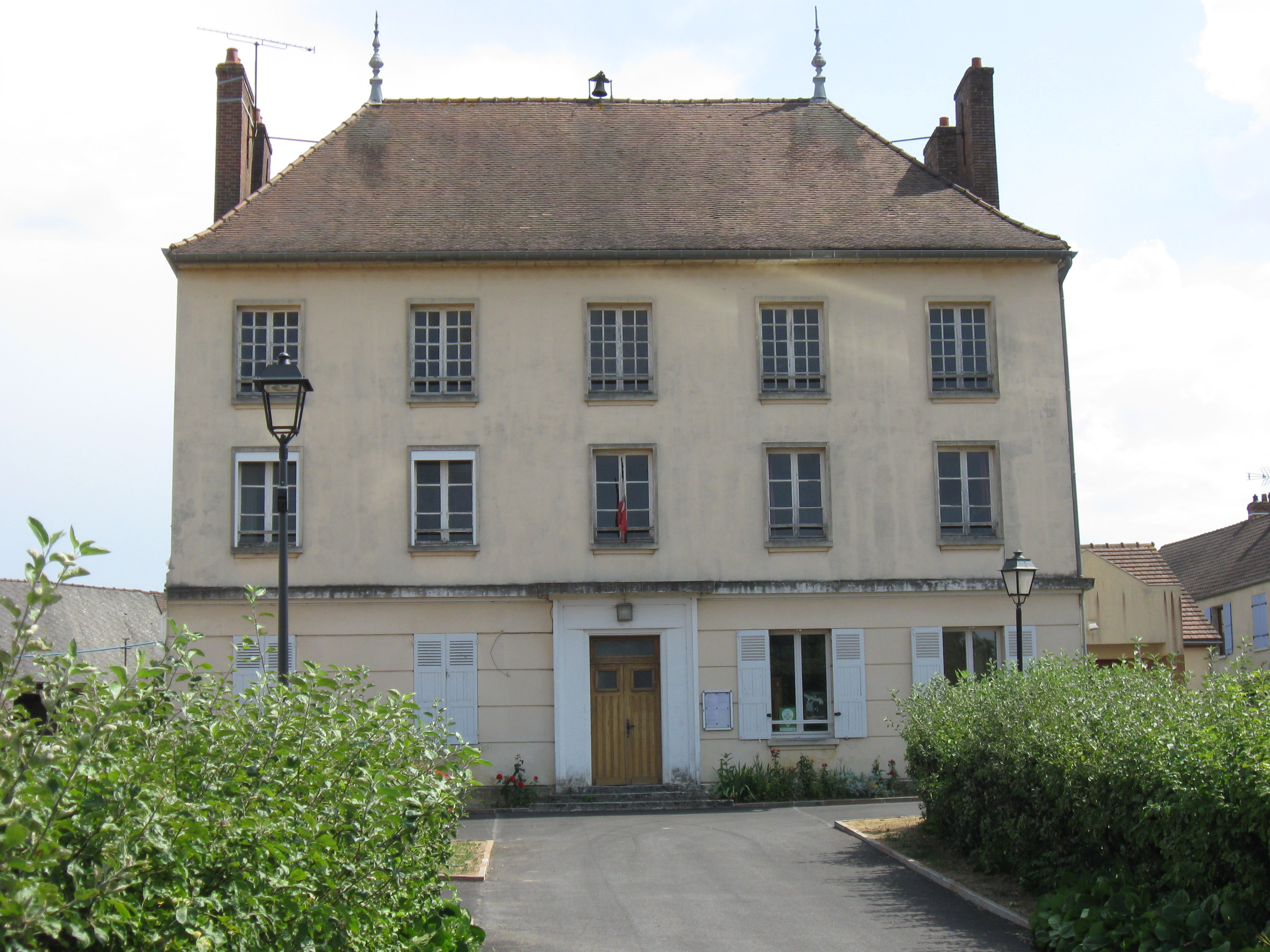
- Town hall
- Location of Saint-Illiers-la-Ville
- Location within France Location within Île-de-France (region)
- Coordinates: 48°58′37″N 1°32′29″E
- Country: France
- Region: Île-de-France
- Department: Yvelines
- Arrondissement: Mantes-la-Jolie
- Canton: Bonnières-sur-Seine

Government
  - Mayor (2023–2026): Sylvain Daniel
- Area^{1}: 6.48 km^{2} (2.50 sq mi)
- Elevation: 125 m (410 ft)
- Highest elevation: 167 m (548 ft)
- Lowest elevation: 76 m (249 ft)
- Population (2023): 350
  - Density: 54/km^{2} (140/sq mi)
- Time zone: UTC+01:00 (CET)
  - Summer (DST): UTC+02:00 (CEST)
- INSEE/Postal code: 78558 /78980
- ^{1} French Land Register data, which excludes lakes, ponds, glaciers > 1 km^{2} (0.386 sq mi or 247 acres) and river estuaries.

Saint-Illiers-la-Ville (French pronunciation: [sɛ̃t‿ilje la vil]) is a commune in the Yvelines department in the Île-de-France in north-central France.

== See also ==
- Communes of the Yvelines department
