= Lommoye =

- Commune
- Location of Lommoye
- Location within France Location within Île-de-France (region)
- Coordinates: 48°59′41″N 1°30′52″E
- Country: France
- Region: Île-de-France
- Department: Yvelines
- Arrondissement: Mantes-la-Jolie
- Canton: Bonnières-sur-Seine

Government
  - Mayor (2020–2026): Antoinette Saule
- Area^{1}: 9.38 km^{2} (3.62 sq mi)
- Elevation: 140 m (460 ft)
- Highest elevation: 167 m (548 ft)
- Lowest elevation: 82 m (269 ft)
- Population (2023): 639
  - Density: 68.1/km^{2} (176/sq mi)
- Time zone: UTC+01:00 (CET)
  - Summer (DST): UTC+02:00 (CEST)
- INSEE/Postal code: 78344 /78270
- ^{1} French Land Register data, which excludes lakes, ponds, glaciers > 1 km^{2} (0.386 sq mi or 247 acres) and river estuaries.

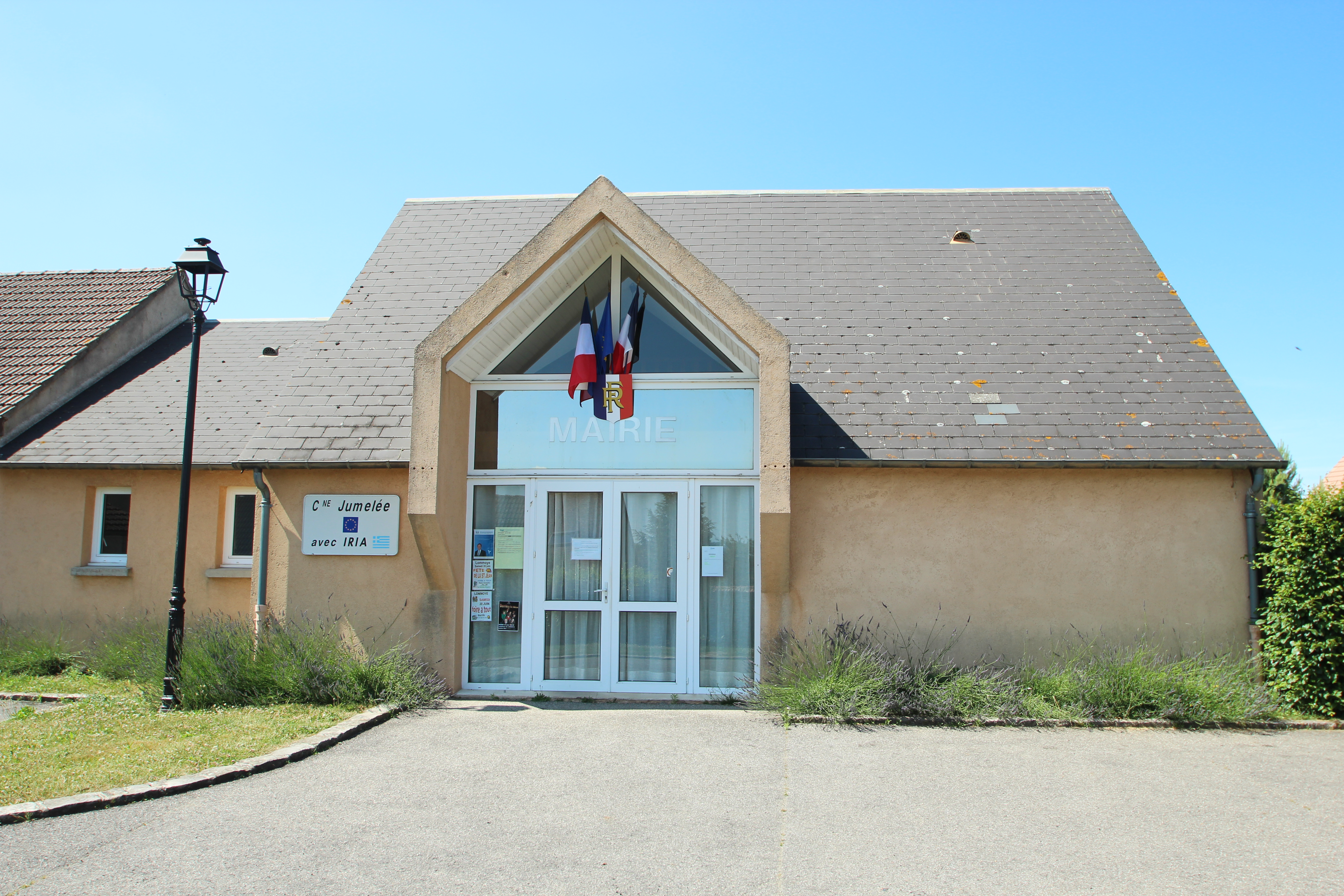
Town hall of Lommoye, France.

Lommoye (French pronunciation: [lɔmwa]) is a commune in the Yvelines department in the Île-de-France region in north-central France.

== See also ==
- Communes of the Yvelines department
