= Neauphlette =

- Commune
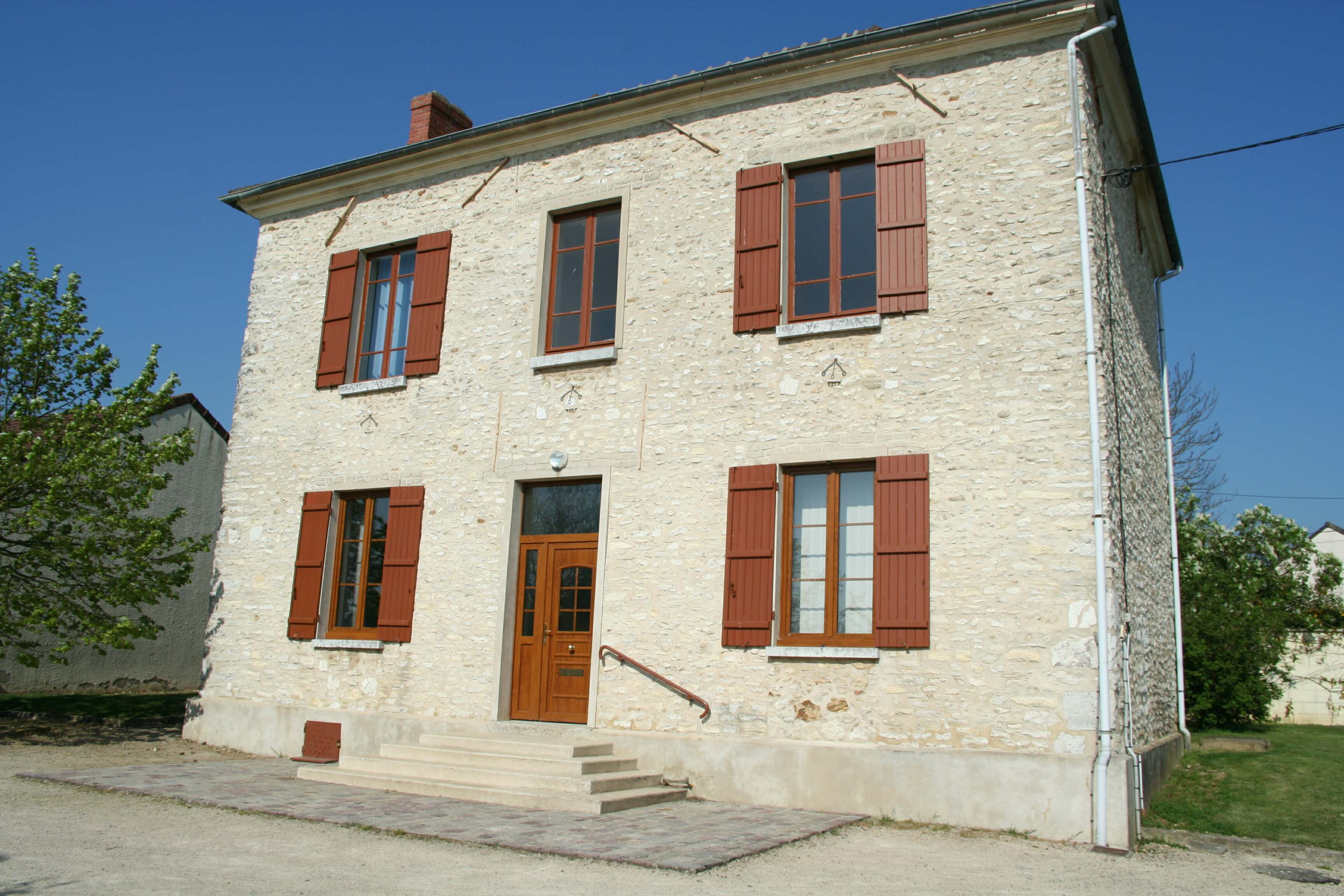
- Town hall
- Location of Neauphlette
- Location within France Location within Île-de-France (region)
- Coordinates: 48°55′55″N 1°31′37″E
- Country: France
- Region: Île-de-France
- Department: Yvelines
- Arrondissement: Mantes-la-Jolie
- Canton: Bonnières-sur-Seine

Government
  - Mayor (2020–2026): Jean-Luc Kokelka
- Area^{1}: 9.72 km^{2} (3.75 sq mi)
- Elevation: 114 m (374 ft)
- Highest elevation: 162 m (531 ft)
- Lowest elevation: 100 m (330 ft)
- Population (2023): 871
  - Density: 89.6/km^{2} (232/sq mi)
- Time zone: UTC+01:00 (CET)
  - Summer (DST): UTC+02:00 (CEST)
- INSEE/Postal code: 78444 /78980
- ^{1} French Land Register data, which excludes lakes, ponds, glaciers > 1 km^{2} (0.386 sq mi or 247 acres) and river estuaries.

Neauphlette (French pronunciation: [noflɛt]) is a commune in the Yvelines department in the Île-de-France region in north-central France.

== See also ==
- Communes of the Yvelines department
