= Saint-Martin-des-Champs, Yvelines =

Saint-Martin-des-Champs
- Commune
- Town hall
- Location of Saint-Martin-des-Champs
- Location within France Location within Île-de-France (region)
- Coordinates: 48°52′56″N 1°43′05″E
- Country: France
- Region: Île-de-France
- Department: Yvelines
- Arrondissement: Mantes-la-Jolie
- Canton: Bonnières-sur-Seine
- Intercommunality: Pays houdanais

Government
  - Mayor (2020–2026): Stéphane Bazonnet
- Area^{1}: 6.21 km^{2} (2.40 sq mi)
- Highest elevation: 174 m (571 ft)
- Lowest elevation: 71 m (233 ft)
- Population (2023): 304
  - Density: 49.0/km^{2} (127/sq mi)
- Demonym: Saint-Martinois
- Time zone: UTC+01:00 (CET)
  - Summer (DST): UTC+02:00 (CEST)
- INSEE/Postal code: 78565 /78790
- ^{1} French Land Register data, which excludes lakes, ponds, glaciers > 1 km^{2} (0.386 sq mi or 247 acres) and river estuaries.

Saint-Martin-des-Champs (French pronunciation: [sɛ̃ maʁtɛ̃ de ʃɑ̃]) is a commune in the Yvelines department in the Île-de-France region in north-central France.

== See also ==
- Communes of the Yvelines department
