= René Hubert (historian) =

French philosopher

René Hubert (22 July 1885 – 13 October 1954) was a French historian of philosophy and educational theorist.

Hubert was born in Dammartin-en-Serve. He gained his agrégé in philosophy in 1908. He became professor of Morals, Sociology and Philosophy of Science at the Faculty of Letters of the University of Lille in 1923, and in 1936 Rector of the Academy of Poitiers.

He wrote on the eighteenth-century Enlightenment - the Encyclopédie, Jean-Jacques Rousseau and Baron d'Holbach - as well as on educational theory.

== Works ==
- Les Sciences sociales dans l'Encyclopédie. La philosophie de l'histoire et le probleme des origines sociales, 1923
- D'Holbach et ses amis, 1928
- Rousseau et l'Encyclopédie. Essai sur la formation des idées politiques de Rousseau (1742 - 1756), 1928
- Traité de la pédagogie générale, 1946
- Histoire de la pédagogie, 1949
