= Richebourg, Yvelines =

Richebourg
- Commune
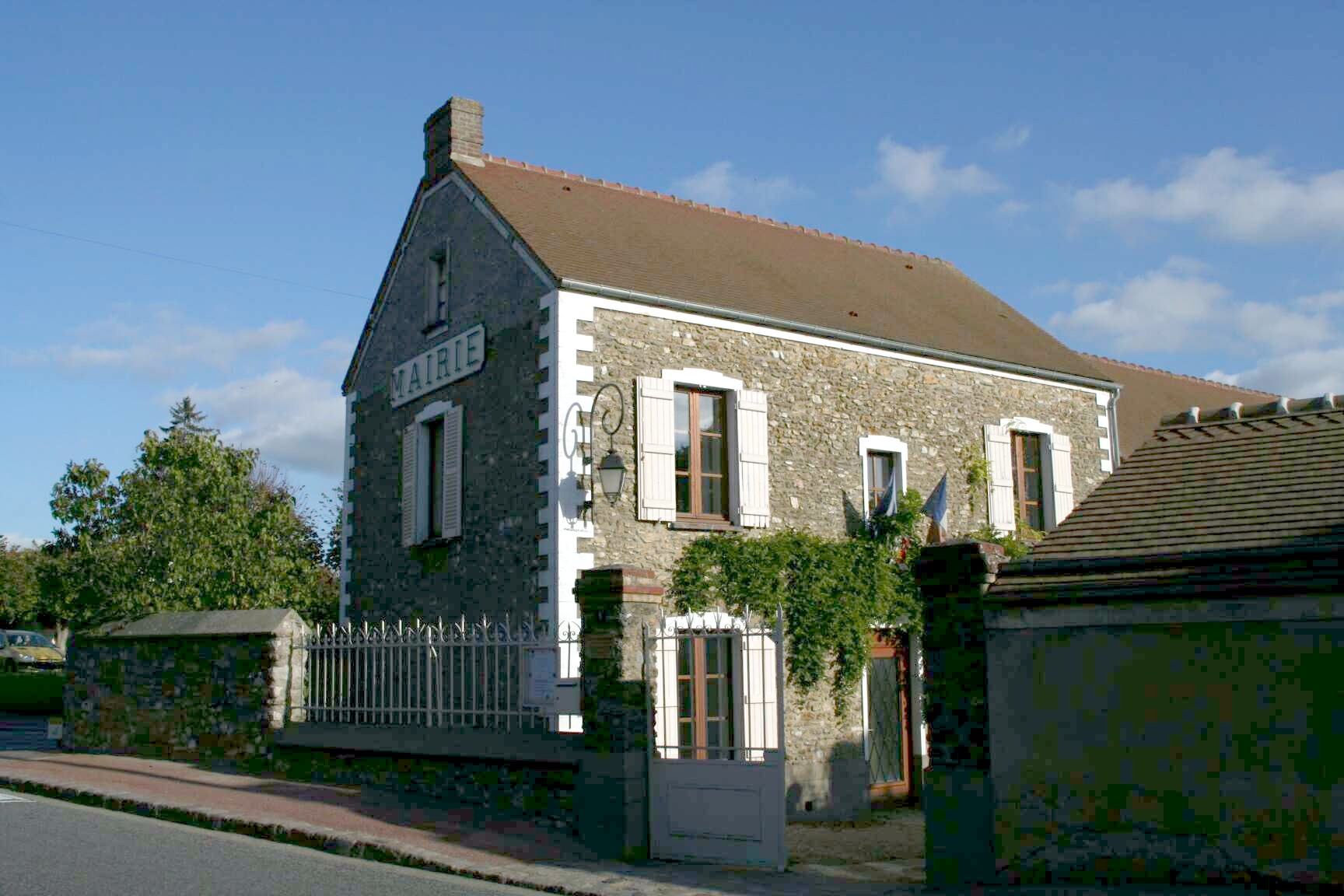
- Town hall

- Coat of arms
- Location of Richebourg
- Location within France Location within Île-de-France (region)
- Coordinates: 48°49′27″N 1°38′18″E
- Country: France
- Region: Île-de-France
- Department: Yvelines
- Arrondissement: Mantes-la-Jolie
- Canton: Bonnières-sur-Seine
- Intercommunality: Pays houdanais

Government
  - Mayor (2020–2026): Bernadette Courty
- Area^{1}: 10.55 km^{2} (4.07 sq mi)
- Elevation: 128 m (420 ft)
- Highest elevation: 170 m (560 ft)
- Lowest elevation: 105 m (344 ft)
- Population (2023): 1,570
  - Density: 149/km^{2} (385/sq mi)
- Time zone: UTC+01:00 (CET)
  - Summer (DST): UTC+02:00 (CEST)
- INSEE/Postal code: 78520 /78550
- ^{1} French Land Register data, which excludes lakes, ponds, glaciers > 1 km^{2} (0.386 sq mi or 247 acres) and river estuaries.

Richebourg (French pronunciation: [ʁiʃbuʁ]) is a commune in the Yvelines department in the Île-de-France region in north-central France.

== See also ==
- Communes of the Yvelines department
