= Villette, Yvelines =

Villette
- Commune
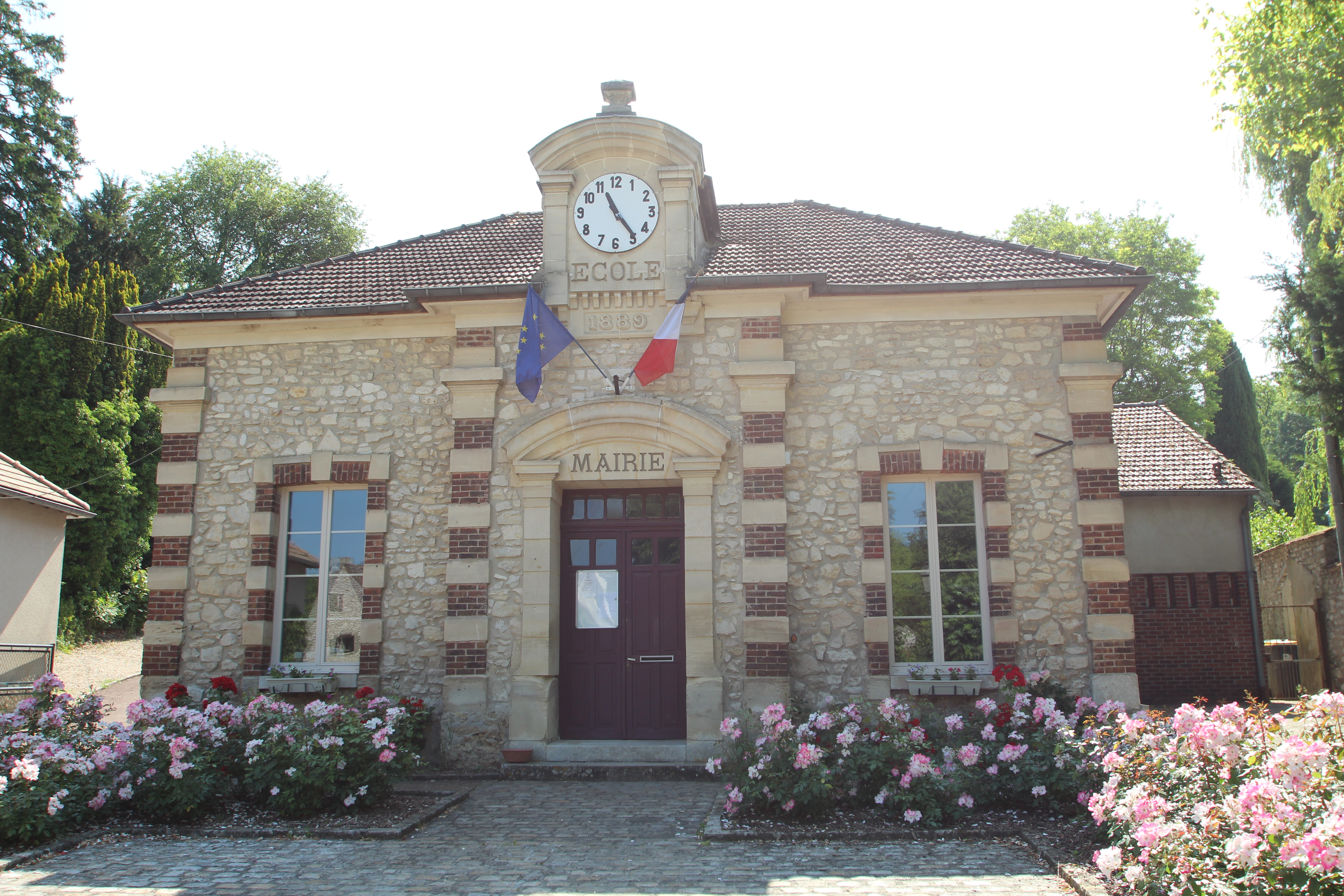

- Coat of arms
- Location of Villette
- Location within France Location within Île-de-France (region)
- Coordinates: 48°55′41″N 1°41′34″E
- Country: France
- Region: Île-de-France
- Department: Yvelines
- Arrondissement: Mantes-la-Jolie
- Canton: Bonnières-sur-Seine

Government
  - Mayor (2020–2026): Philippe Pasdeloup
- Area^{1}: 4.63 km^{2} (1.79 sq mi)
- Elevation: 60 m (200 ft)
- Highest elevation: 142 m (466 ft)
- Lowest elevation: 40 m (130 ft)
- Population (2023): 524
  - Density: 113/km^{2} (293/sq mi)
- Time zone: UTC+01:00 (CET)
  - Summer (DST): UTC+02:00 (CEST)
- INSEE/Postal code: 78677 /78930
- ^{1} French Land Register data, which excludes lakes, ponds, glaciers > 1 km^{2} (0.386 sq mi or 247 acres) and river estuaries.

Villette (French pronunciation: [vilɛt]) is a commune in the Yvelines department in the Île-de-France region in north-central France.

== See also ==
- Communes of the Yvelines department
