= La Hauteville =

- Commune
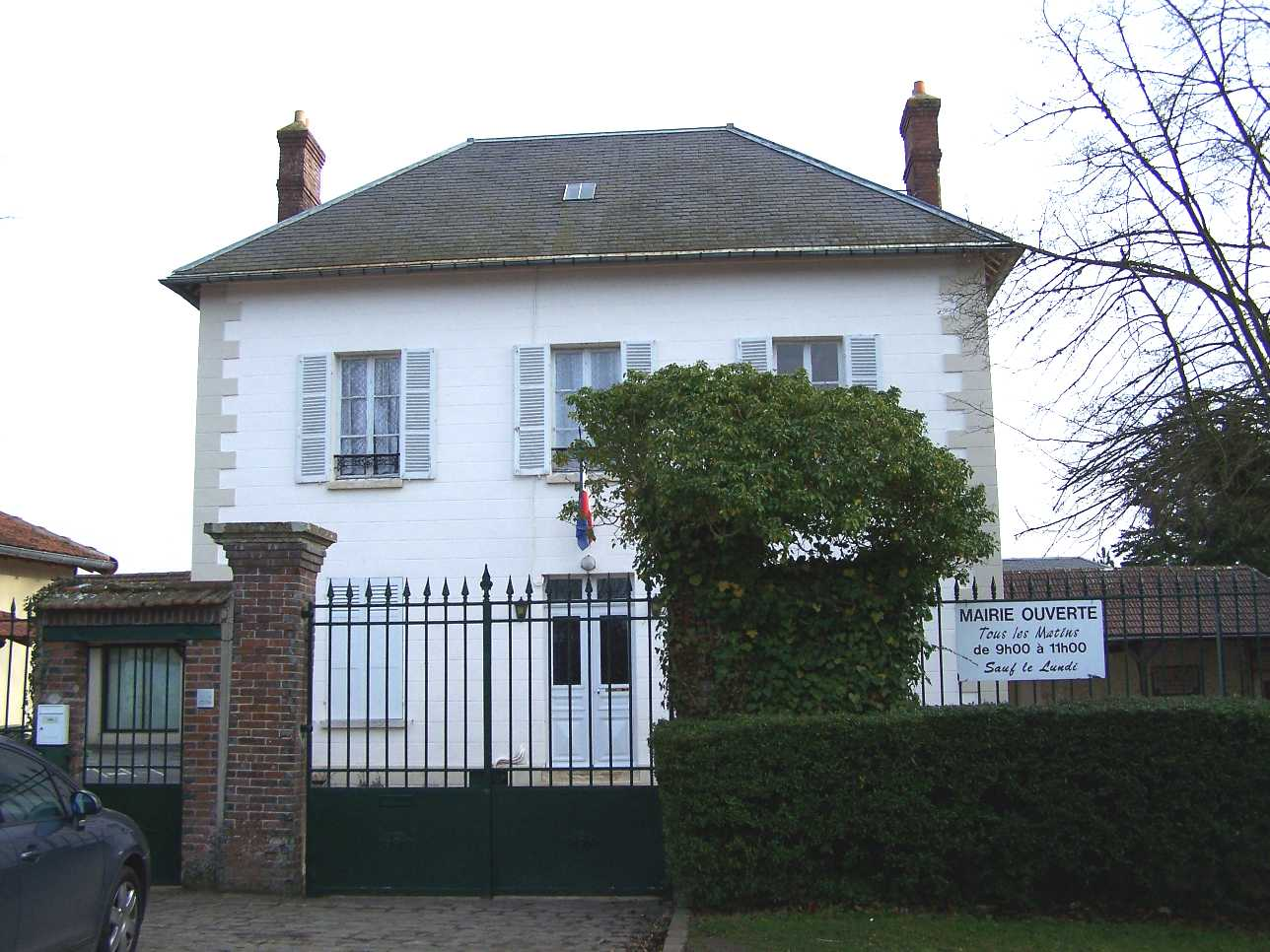
- Town hall
- Location of La Hauteville
- Location within France Location within Île-de-France (region)
- Coordinates: 48°42′19″N 1°37′17″E
- Country: France
- Region: Île-de-France
- Department: Yvelines
- Arrondissement: Mantes-la-Jolie
- Canton: Bonnières-sur-Seine

Government
  - Mayor (2020–2026): Marc Courteaud
- Area^{1}: 4.86 km^{2} (1.88 sq mi)
- Elevation: 151 m (495 ft)
- Highest elevation: 184 m (604 ft)
- Lowest elevation: 134 m (440 ft)
- Population (2023): 157
  - Density: 32.3/km^{2} (83.7/sq mi)
- Time zone: UTC+01:00 (CET)
  - Summer (DST): UTC+02:00 (CEST)
- INSEE/Postal code: 78302 /78113
- ^{1} French Land Register data, which excludes lakes, ponds, glaciers > 1 km^{2} (0.386 sq mi or 247 acres) and river estuaries.

La Hauteville (French pronunciation: [la otvil]) is a commune in the Yvelines department in the Île-de-France region in north-central France.

== See also ==
- Communes of the Yvelines department
