= Adainville =

- Commune
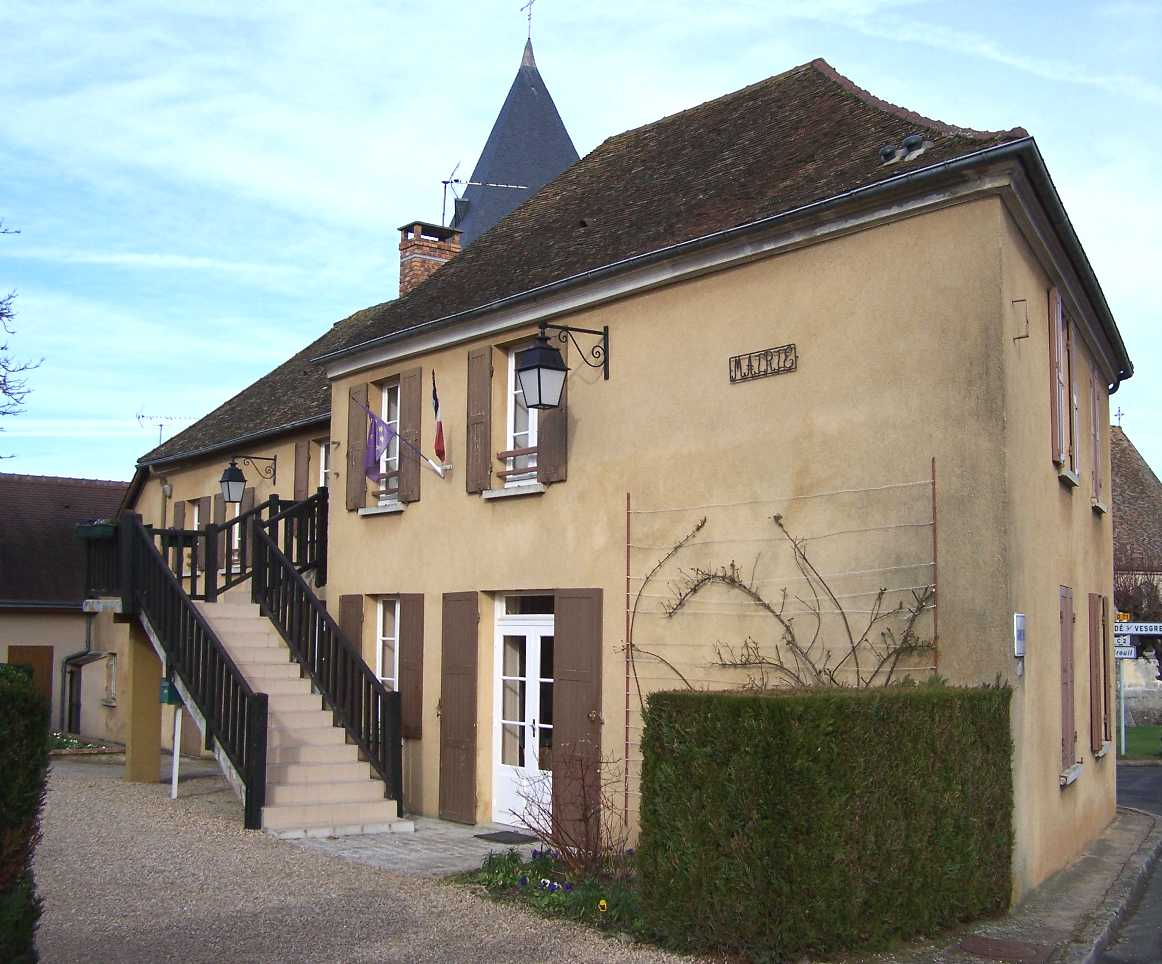
- The town hall in Adainville

- Coat of arms
- Location of Adainville
- Location within France Location within Île-de-France (region)
- Coordinates: 48°43′28″N 1°39′16″E
- Country: France
- Region: Île-de-France
- Department: Yvelines
- Arrondissement: Mantes-la-Jolie
- Canton: Bonnières-sur-Seine
- Intercommunality: Pays Houdanais

Government
  - Mayor (2020–2026): Jean-Marc Raimondo
- Area^{1}: 10.16 km^{2} (3.92 sq mi)
- Highest elevation: 184 m (604 ft)
- Lowest elevation: 105 m (344 ft)
- Population (2023): 673
  - Density: 66.2/km^{2} (172/sq mi)
- Time zone: UTC+01:00 (CET)
  - Summer (DST): UTC+02:00 (CEST)
- INSEE/Postal code: 78006 /78113
- ^{1} French Land Register data, which excludes lakes, ponds, glaciers > 1 km^{2} (0.386 sq mi or 247 acres) and river estuaries.

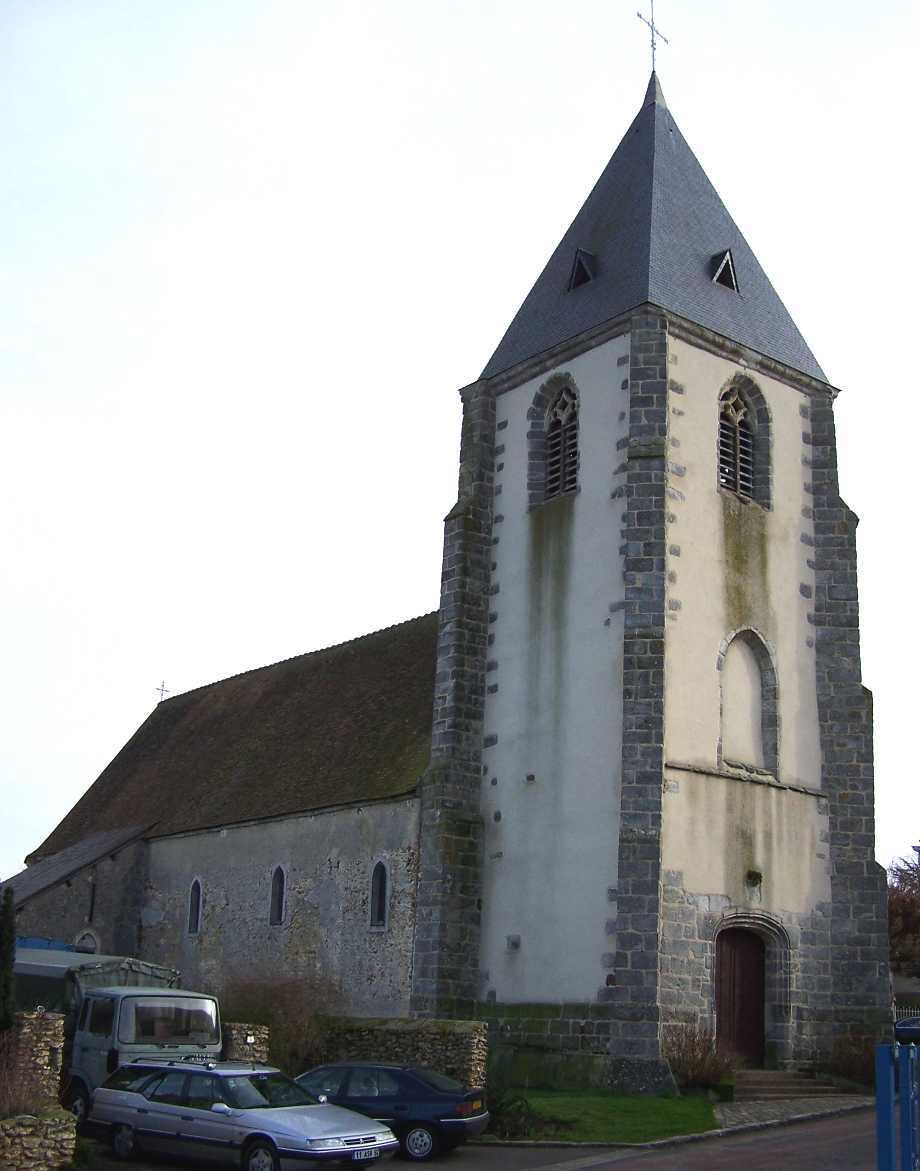
L'église Saint-Denis

Adainville (French pronunciation: [adɛ̃vil]) is a commune in the Yvelines department in north-central France.

== Population ==
Historical population
Year	Pop.	±% p.a.
1968	324	—
1975	399	+3.02%
1982	522	+3.91%
1990	839	+6.11%
1999	824	−0.20%
2007	773	−0.80%
2012	756	−0.44%
2017	731	−0.67%
2023	673	−1.37%
Source: INSEE

== See also ==
- Communes of the Yvelines department
