= Rosay, Yvelines =

Rosay
- Commune
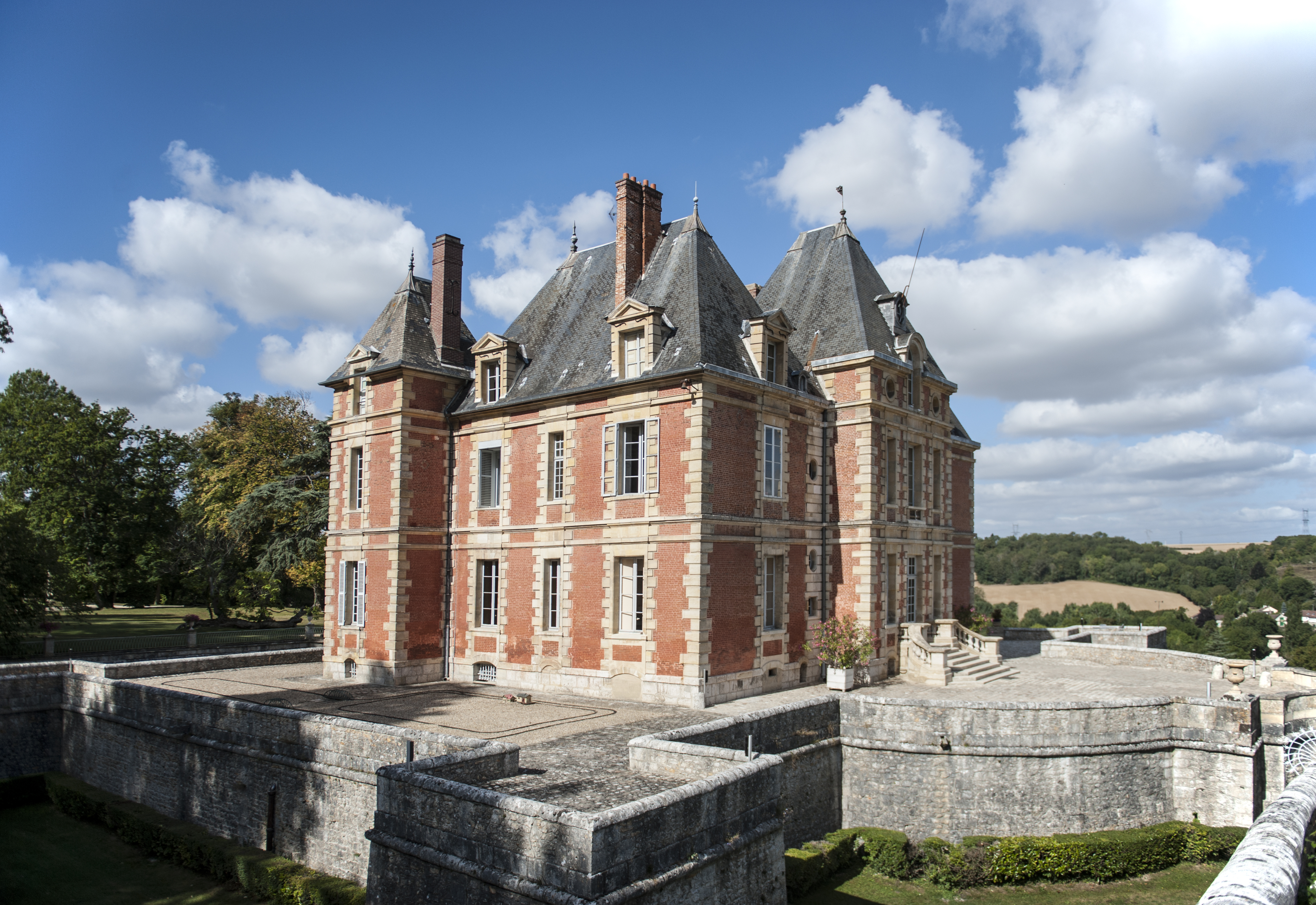
- The Chateau du Haut Rosay

- Coat of arms
- Location of Rosay
- Location within France Location within Île-de-France (region)
- Coordinates: 48°55′03″N 1°40′41″E
- Country: France
- Region: Île-de-France
- Department: Yvelines
- Arrondissement: Mantes-la-Jolie
- Canton: Bonnières-sur-Seine

Government
  - Mayor (2020–2026): Bruno Marmin
- Area^{1}: 4.54 km^{2} (1.75 sq mi)
- Elevation: 98 m (322 ft)
- Highest elevation: 168 m (551 ft)
- Lowest elevation: 47 m (154 ft)
- Population (2023): 387
  - Density: 85.2/km^{2} (221/sq mi)
- Time zone: UTC+01:00 (CET)
  - Summer (DST): UTC+02:00 (CEST)
- INSEE/Postal code: 78530 /78790
- ^{1} French Land Register data, which excludes lakes, ponds, glaciers > 1 km^{2} (0.386 sq mi or 247 acres) and river estuaries.

Rosay (French pronunciation: [ʁozɛ]) is a commune in Yvelines, a department in the Île-de-France in north-central France.

== Heraldry ==
| Coat of arms of Rosay | Or, a fess azure charged with a crescent of the field, accompanied by three roses gules pointed vert. |

== See also ==
- Communes of the Yvelines department
