= Le Tartre-Gaudran =

- Commune
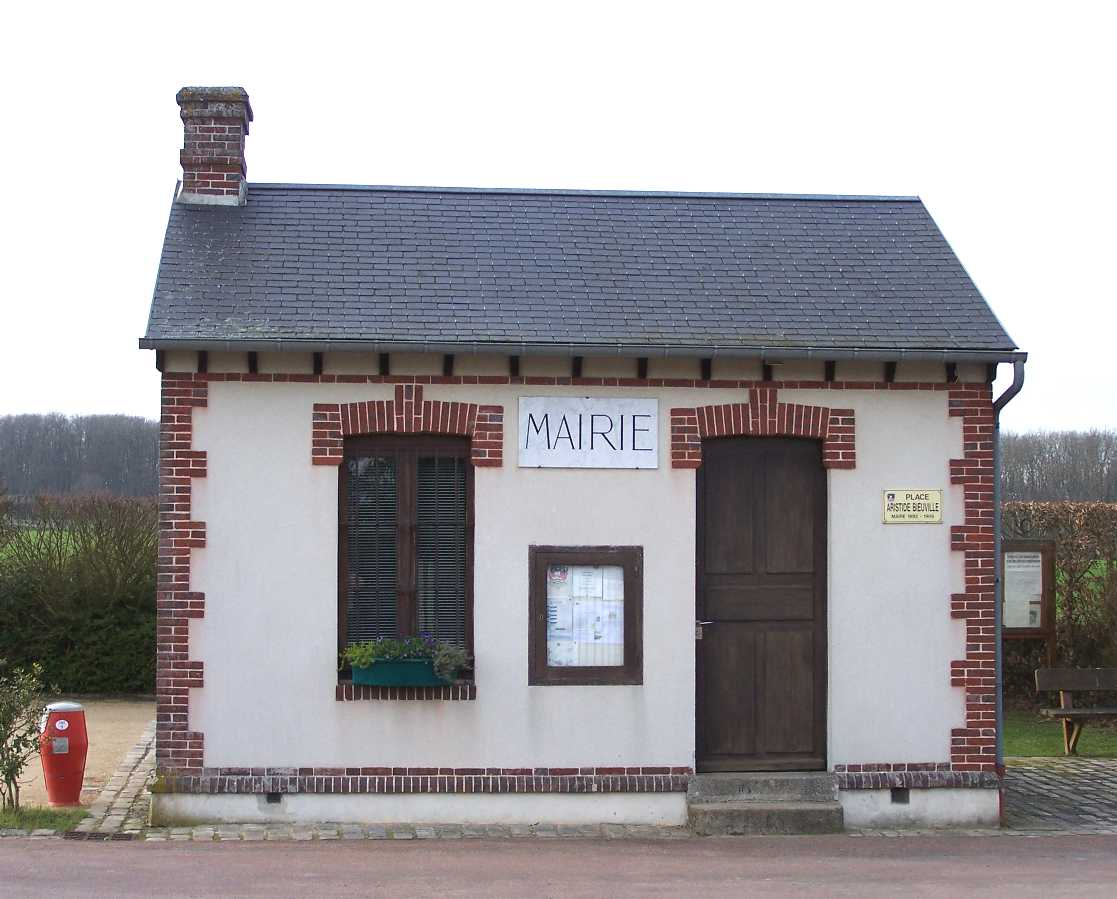
- Town hall

- Coat of arms
- Location of Le Tartre-Gaudran
- Location within France Location within Île-de-France (region)
- Coordinates: 48°42′00″N 1°35′47″E
- Country: France
- Region: Île-de-France
- Department: Yvelines
- Arrondissement: Mantes-la-Jolie
- Canton: Bonnières-sur-Seine

Government
  - Mayor (2020–2026): Frédéric de la Rue
- Area^{1}: 4.28 km^{2} (1.65 sq mi)
- Elevation: 160 m (520 ft)
- Highest elevation: 174 m (571 ft)
- Lowest elevation: 134 m (440 ft)
- Population (2023): 37
  - Density: 8.6/km^{2} (22/sq mi)
- Time zone: UTC+01:00 (CET)
  - Summer (DST): UTC+02:00 (CEST)
- INSEE/Postal code: 78606 /78113
- ^{1} French Land Register data, which excludes lakes, ponds, glaciers > 1 km^{2} (0.386 sq mi or 247 acres) and river estuaries.

Le Tartre-Gaudran (French pronunciation: [lə taʁtʁ ɡodʁɑ̃]) is a commune in the Yvelines department in the Île-de-France region in north-central France.

== See also ==
- Communes of the Yvelines department
