= Limetz-Villez =

- Commune
- Coat of arms
- Location of Limetz-Villez
- Location within France Location within Île-de-France (region)
- Coordinates: 49°03′42″N 1°32′58″E
- Country: France
- Region: Île-de-France
- Department: Yvelines
- Arrondissement: Mantes-la-Jolie
- Canton: Bonnières-sur-Seine
- Intercommunality: Portes de l’Île-de-France

Government
  - Mayor (2020–2026): Michel Obry
- Area^{1}: 9.35 km^{2} (3.61 sq mi)
- Elevation: 20 m (66 ft)
- Highest elevation: 105 m (344 ft)
- Lowest elevation: 9 m (30 ft)
- Population (2023): 2,110
  - Density: 226/km^{2} (584/sq mi)
- Time zone: UTC+01:00 (CET)
  - Summer (DST): UTC+02:00 (CEST)
- INSEE/Postal code: 78337 /78270
- ^{1} French Land Register data, which excludes lakes, ponds, glaciers > 1 km^{2} (0.386 sq mi or 247 acres) and river estuaries.

Limetz-Villez is a commune in the Yvelines department in the Île-de-France region in north-central France.

== Population ==
Historical population
| Year | Pop. | ±% p.a. |
|---|---|---|
| 1968 | 733 | — |
| 1975 | 828 | +1.76% |
| 1982 | 1,158 | +4.91% |
| 1990 | 1,400 | +2.40% |
| 1999 | 1,753 | +2.53% |
| 2007 | 1,919 | +1.14% |
| 2012 | 1,918 | −0.01% |
| 2017 | 1,942 | +0.25% |
| 2023 | 2,110 | +1.39% |
Source: INSEE

== See also ==
- Communes of the Yvelines department
