= Longnes, Yvelines =

Longnes
- Commune
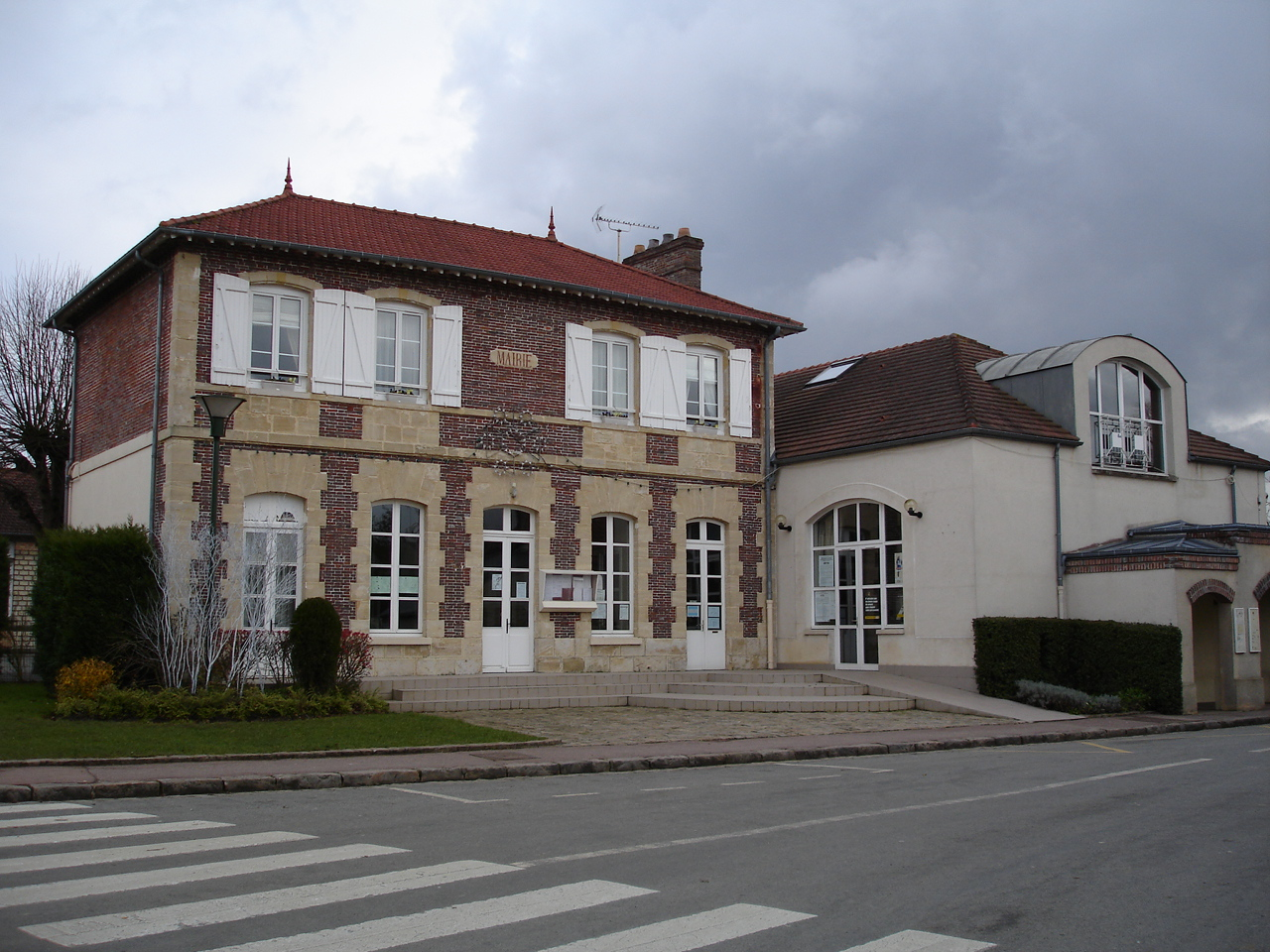
- Town hall
- Location of Longnes
- Location within France Location within Île-de-France (region)
- Coordinates: 48°55′18″N 1°35′17″E
- Country: France
- Region: Île-de-France
- Department: Yvelines
- Arrondissement: Mantes-la-Jolie
- Canton: Bonnières-sur-Seine
- Intercommunality: Pays houdanais

Government
  - Mayor (2023–2026): Anne Debras
- Area^{1}: 13.76 km^{2} (5.31 sq mi)
- Elevation: 125 m (410 ft)
- Highest elevation: 160 m (520 ft)
- Lowest elevation: 109 m (358 ft)
- Population (2023): 1,601
  - Density: 116.4/km^{2} (301.3/sq mi)
- Time zone: UTC+01:00 (CET)
  - Summer (DST): UTC+02:00 (CEST)
- INSEE/Postal code: 78346 /78980
- ^{1} French Land Register data, which excludes lakes, ponds, glaciers > 1 km^{2} (0.386 sq mi or 247 acres) and river estuaries.

Longnes is a commune in the Yvelines department in the Île-de-France region in north-central France.

== See also ==
- Communes of the Yvelines department
