= Cravent =

- Commune
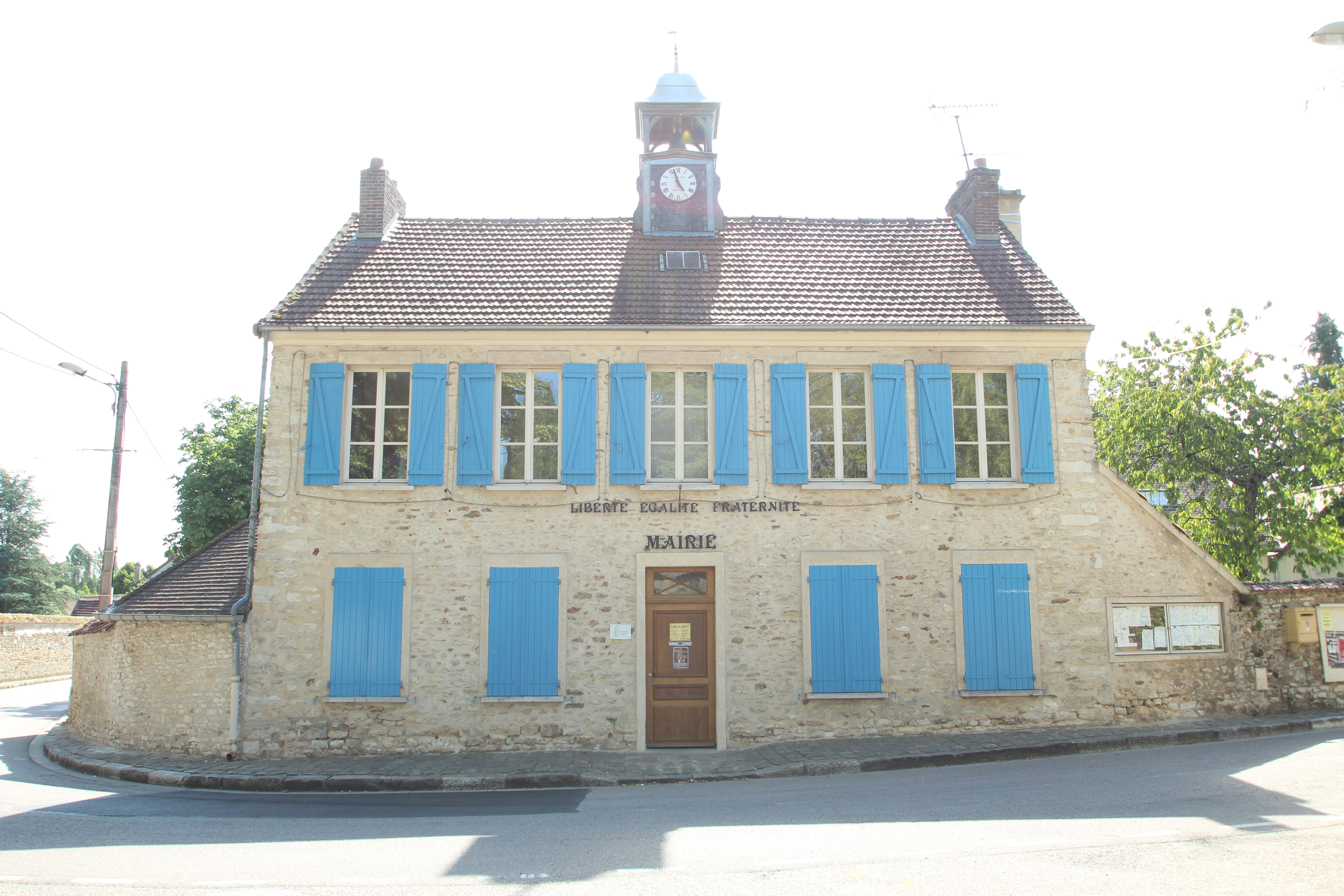
- Cravent Town hall
- Location of Cravent
- Location within France Location within Île-de-France (region)
- Coordinates: 48°59′30″N 1°29′20″E
- Country: France
- Region: Île-de-France
- Department: Yvelines
- Arrondissement: Mantes-la-Jolie
- Canton: Bonnières-sur-Seine

Government
  - Mayor (2020–2026): Jacky Joubert
- Area^{1}: 6.13 km^{2} (2.37 sq mi)
- Elevation: 159 m (522 ft)
- Highest elevation: 167 m (548 ft)
- Lowest elevation: 105 m (344 ft)
- Population (2023): 438
  - Density: 71.5/km^{2} (185/sq mi)
- Time zone: UTC+01:00 (CET)
  - Summer (DST): UTC+02:00 (CEST)
- INSEE/Postal code: 78188 /78270
- ^{1} French Land Register data, which excludes lakes, ponds, glaciers > 1 km^{2} (0.386 sq mi or 247 acres) and river estuaries.

Cravent (French pronunciation: [kʁavɑ̃]) is a commune in the Yvelines department in the Île-de-France region in north-central France.

== See also ==
- Communes of the Yvelines department
