= Bréval =

- Commune
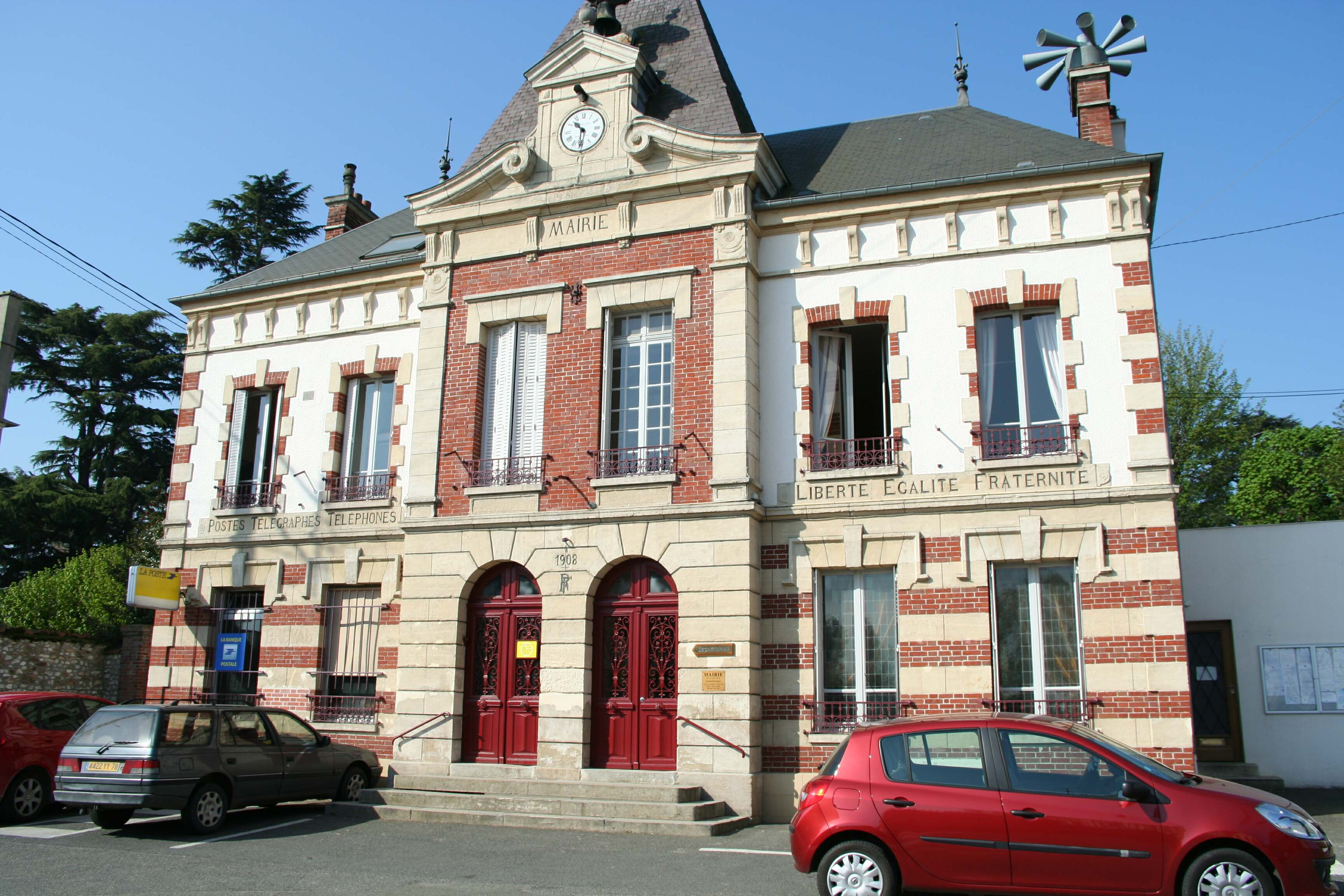
- Town hall

- Coat of arms
- Location of Bréval
- Location within France Location within Île-de-France (region)
- Coordinates: 48°56′42″N 1°32′02″E
- Country: France
- Region: Île-de-France
- Department: Yvelines
- Arrondissement: Mantes-la-Jolie
- Canton: Bonnières-sur-Seine

Government
  - Mayor (2020–2026): Thierry Navello
- Area^{1}: 11.38 km^{2} (4.39 sq mi)
- Elevation: 131 m (430 ft)
- Highest elevation: 163 m (535 ft)
- Lowest elevation: 107 m (351 ft)
- Population (2023): 2,151
  - Density: 189.0/km^{2} (489.5/sq mi)
- Time zone: UTC+01:00 (CET)
  - Summer (DST): UTC+02:00 (CEST)
- INSEE/Postal code: 78107 /78980
- ^{1} French Land Register data, which excludes lakes, ponds, glaciers > 1 km^{2} (0.386 sq mi or 247 acres) and river estuaries.

Bréval (French: [bʁeval]) is a commune in the Yvelines department in the Île-de-France region in north-central France.

== Population ==
Historical population
| Year | Pop. | ±% p.a. |
|---|---|---|
| 1968 | 738 | — |
| 1975 | 912 | +3.07% |
| 1982 | 1,093 | +2.62% |
| 1990 | 1,440 | +3.51% |
| 1999 | 1,646 | +1.50% |
| 2007 | 1,897 | +1.79% |
| 2012 | 1,906 | +0.09% |
| 2017 | 1,820 | −0.92% |
| 2023 | 2,151 | +2.82% |
Source: INSEE

== See also ==
- Communes of the Yvelines department
