= Flins-Neuve-Église =

- Commune
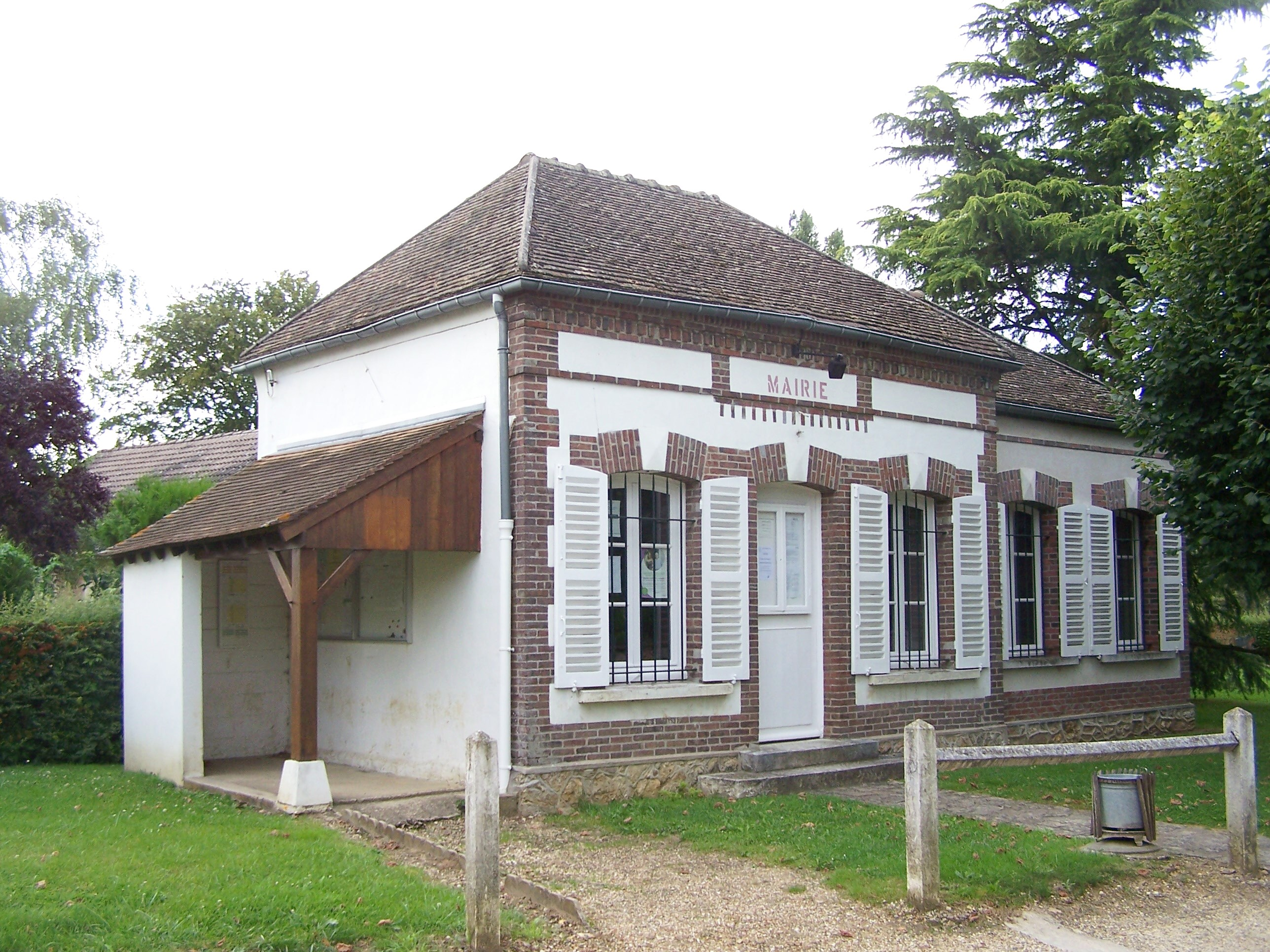
- Town hall
- Location of Flins-Neuve-Église
- Location within France Location within Île-de-France (region)
- Coordinates: 48°53′31″N 1°34′48″E
- Country: France
- Region: Île-de-France
- Department: Yvelines
- Arrondissement: Mantes-la-Jolie
- Canton: Bonnières-sur-Seine
- Intercommunality: Pays houdanais

Government
  - Mayor (2021–2026): Laëtitia Notheaux
- Area^{1}: 1.23 km^{2} (0.47 sq mi)
- Elevation: 130 m (430 ft)
- Highest elevation: 134 m (440 ft)
- Lowest elevation: 119 m (390 ft)
- Population (2023): 162
  - Density: 132/km^{2} (341/sq mi)
- Time zone: UTC+01:00 (CET)
  - Summer (DST): UTC+02:00 (CEST)
- INSEE/Postal code: 78237 /78790
- ^{1} French Land Register data, which excludes lakes, ponds, glaciers > 1 km^{2} (0.386 sq mi or 247 acres) and river estuaries.

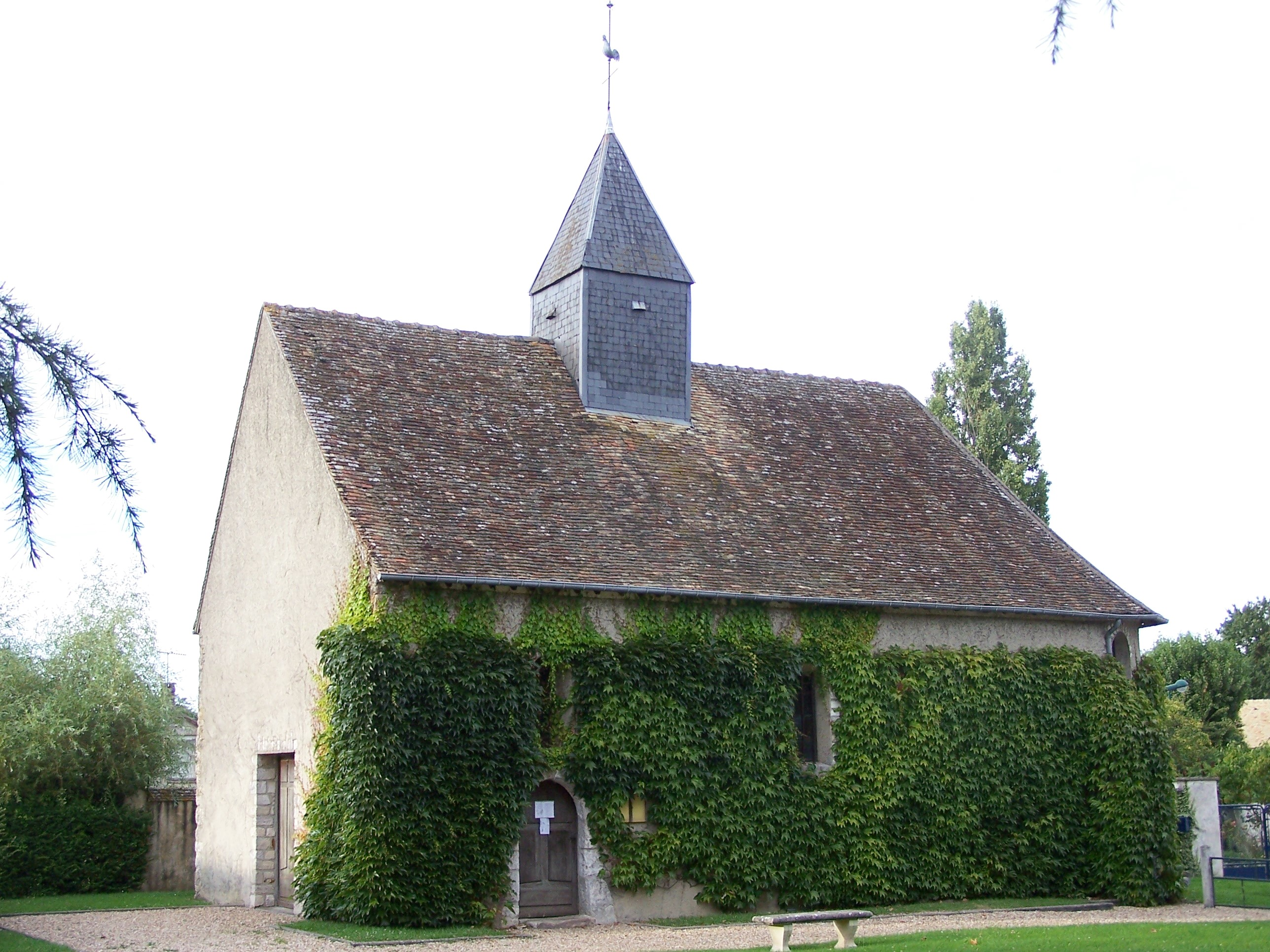
Saint-Denis

Flins-Neuve-Église (French pronunciation: [flɛ̃ nœv eɡliz]) is a commune in the Yvelines department in the Île-de-France in north-central France.

== See also ==
- Communes of the Yvelines department
