= Boissy-Mauvoisin =

- Commune
- Coat of arms
- Location of Boissy-Mauvoisin
- Location within France Location within Île-de-France (region)
- Coordinates: 48°57′47″N 1°34′41″E
- Country: France
- Region: Île-de-France
- Department: Yvelines
- Arrondissement: Mantes-la-Jolie
- Canton: Bonnières-sur-Seine

Government
  - Mayor (2020–2026): Alain Gagne
- Area^{1}: 5.11 km^{2} (1.97 sq mi)
- Elevation: 127 m (417 ft)
- Highest elevation: 163 m (535 ft)
- Lowest elevation: 70 m (230 ft)
- Population (2023): 615
  - Density: 120/km^{2} (312/sq mi)
- Time zone: UTC+01:00 (CET)
  - Summer (DST): UTC+02:00 (CEST)
- INSEE/Postal code: 78082 /78200
- ^{1} French Land Register data, which excludes lakes, ponds, glaciers > 1 km^{2} (0.386 sq mi or 247 acres) and river estuaries.

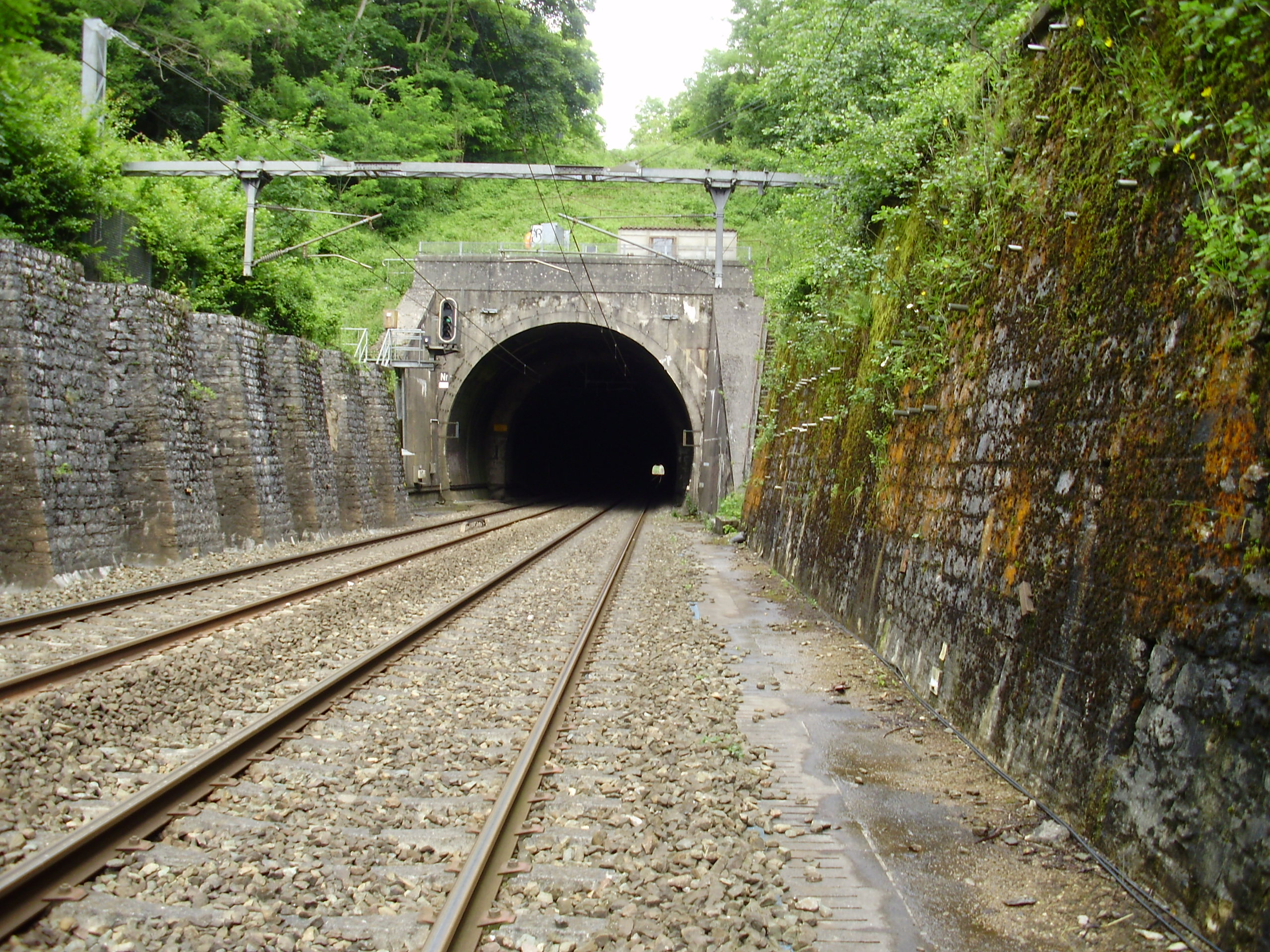
Bréval Tunnel, western entrance to the territory of Bréval, Yvelines, France.

Boissy-Mauvoisin (French pronunciation: [bwasi movwazɛ̃]) is a commune in the Yvelines department in north-central France.

== See also ==
- Communes of the Yvelines department
