= Dammartin-en-Serve =

- Commune
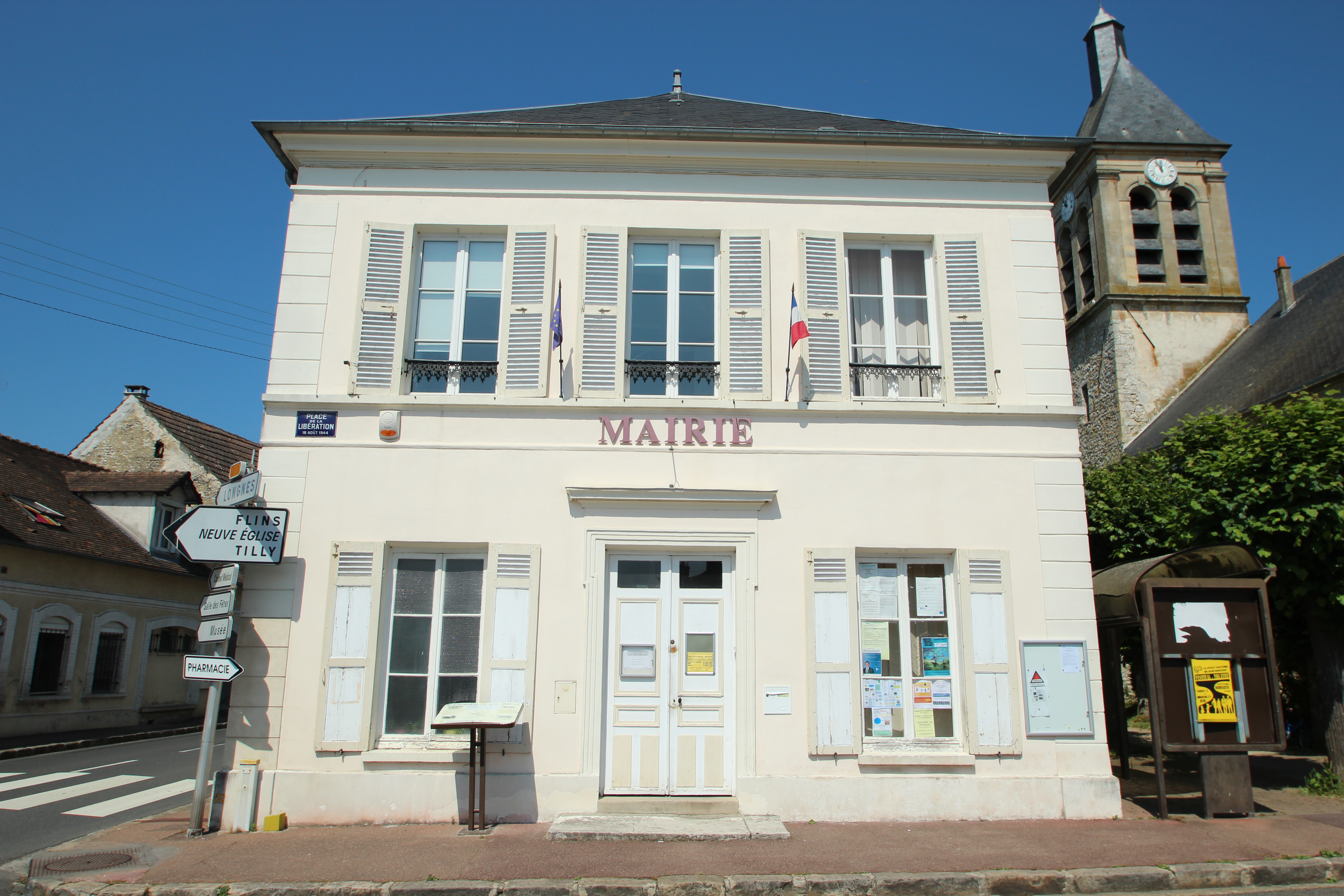
- Dammartin-en-Serve Town hall
- Location of Dammartin-en-Serve
- Location within France Location within Île-de-France (region)
- Coordinates: 48°54′14″N 1°37′12″E
- Country: France
- Region: Île-de-France
- Department: Yvelines
- Arrondissement: Mantes-la-Jolie
- Canton: Bonnières-sur-Seine
- Intercommunality: Pays houdanais

Government
  - Mayor (2020–2026): Ghislaine Siwick
- Area^{1}: 13.98 km^{2} (5.40 sq mi)
- Elevation: 140 m (460 ft)
- Highest elevation: 168 m (551 ft)
- Lowest elevation: 75 m (246 ft)
- Population (2023): 1,441
  - Density: 103.1/km^{2} (267.0/sq mi)
- Time zone: UTC+01:00 (CET)
  - Summer (DST): UTC+02:00 (CEST)
- INSEE/Postal code: 78192 /78111
- ^{1} French Land Register data, which excludes lakes, ponds, glaciers > 1 km^{2} (0.386 sq mi or 247 acres) and river estuaries.

Dammartin-en-Serve (French pronunciation: [damaʁtɛ̃ ɑ̃ sɛʁv]) is a commune in the Yvelines department in the Île-de-France region in north-central France.

== See also ==
- Communes of the Yvelines department
