= Osmoy, Yvelines =

Osmoy
- Commune
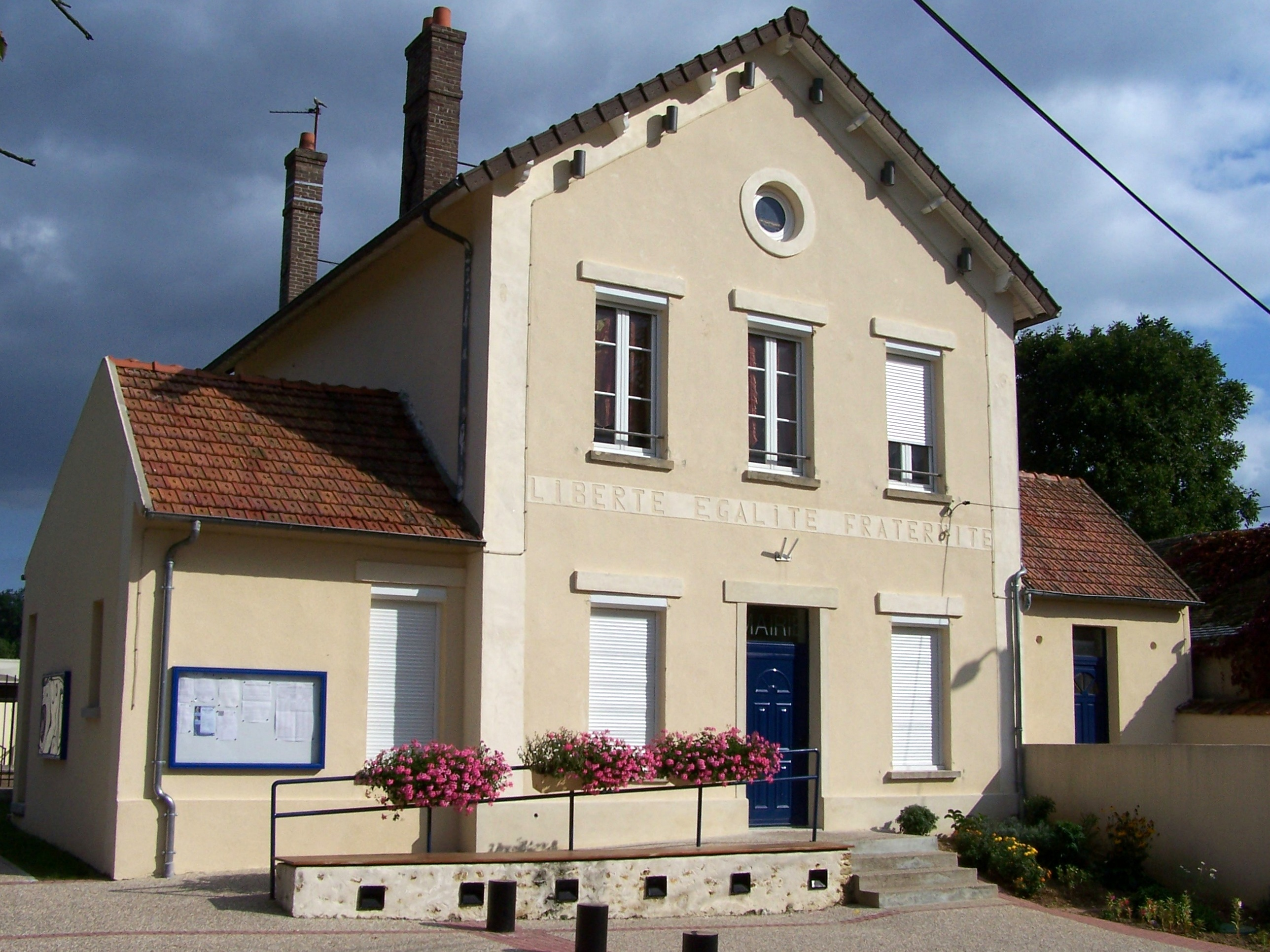
- Town hall

- Coat of arms
- Location of Osmoy
- Location within France Location within Île-de-France (region)
- Coordinates: 48°51′50″N 1°43′01″E
- Country: France
- Region: Île-de-France
- Department: Yvelines
- Arrondissement: Mantes-la-Jolie
- Canton: Bonnières-sur-Seine
- Intercommunality: Pays houdanais

Government
  - Mayor (2022–2026): Jérôme Durand
- Area^{1}: 2.59 km^{2} (1.00 sq mi)
- Elevation: 108 m (354 ft)
- Highest elevation: 128 m (420 ft)
- Lowest elevation: 93 m (305 ft)
- Population (2023): 413
  - Density: 159/km^{2} (413/sq mi)
- Time zone: UTC+01:00 (CET)
  - Summer (DST): UTC+02:00 (CEST)
- INSEE/Postal code: 78475 /78910
- ^{1} French Land Register data, which excludes lakes, ponds, glaciers > 1 km^{2} (0.386 sq mi or 247 acres) and river estuaries.

Osmoy is a commune in the Yvelines department in the Île-de-France region in north-central France.

== See also ==
- Communes of the Yvelines department
