= Mondreville, Yvelines =

Mondreville
- Commune
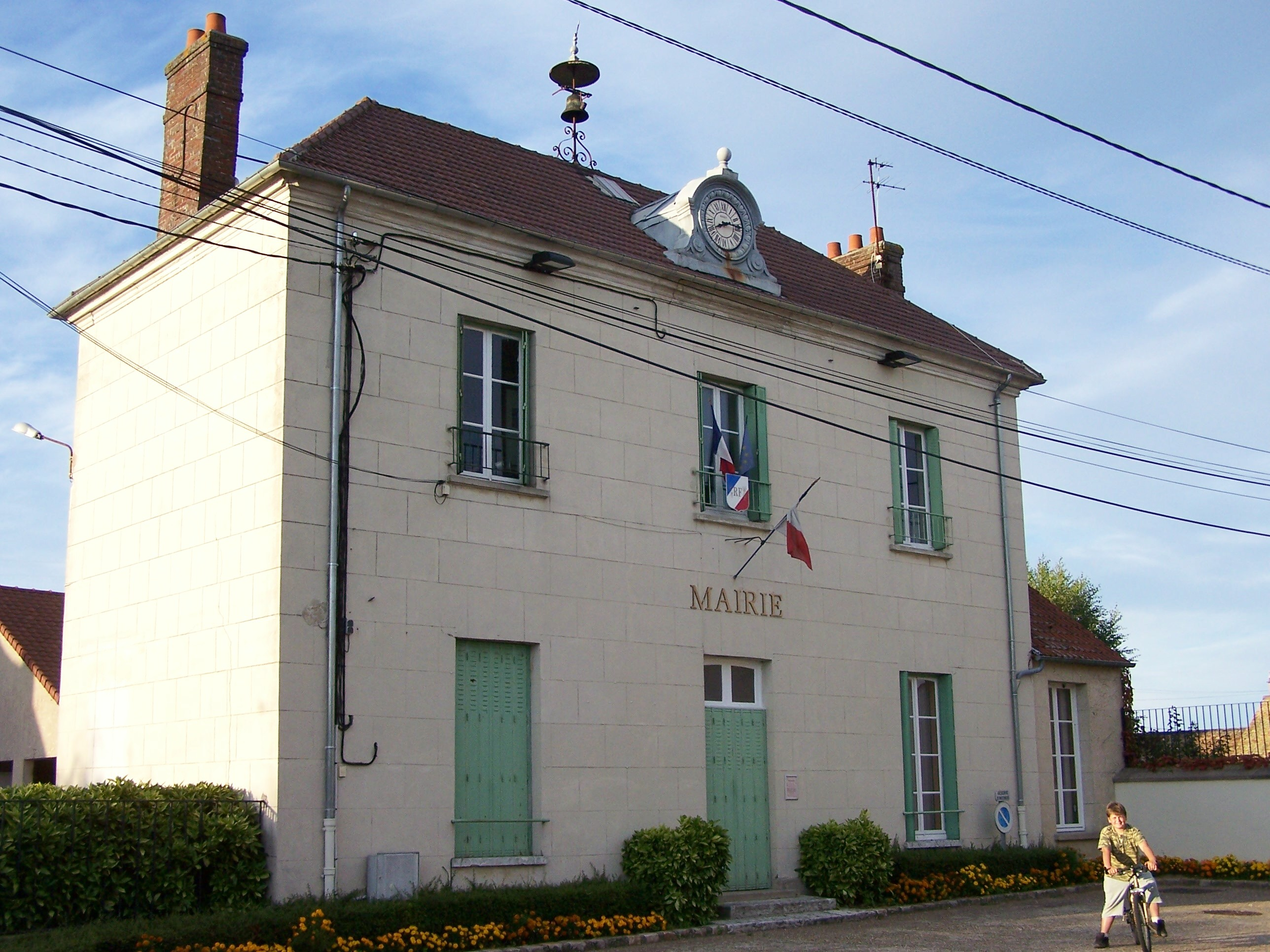
- Town hall
- Location of Mondreville
- Location within France Location within Île-de-France (region)
- Coordinates: 48°54′15″N 1°33′14″E
- Country: France
- Region: Île-de-France
- Department: Yvelines
- Arrondissement: Mantes-la-Jolie
- Canton: Bonnières-sur-Seine
- Intercommunality: Pays houdanais

Government
  - Mayor (2020–2026): Géraud Collet
- Area^{1}: 4.40 km^{2} (1.70 sq mi)
- Elevation: 134 m (440 ft)
- Highest elevation: 140 m (460 ft)
- Lowest elevation: 124 m (407 ft)
- Population (2023): 381
  - Density: 86.6/km^{2} (224/sq mi)
- Time zone: UTC+01:00 (CET)
  - Summer (DST): UTC+02:00 (CEST)
- INSEE/Postal code: 78413 /78980
- ^{1} French Land Register data, which excludes lakes, ponds, glaciers > 1 km^{2} (0.386 sq mi or 247 acres) and river estuaries.

Mondreville (French pronunciation: [mɔ̃dʁəvil]) is a commune in the Yvelines department in the Île-de-France region in north-central France.

== See also ==
- Communes of the Yvelines department
