= Communes of the Yvelines department =

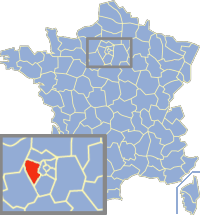

The following is a list of the 259 communes of the French department of Yvelines.

The communes cooperate in the following intercommunalities (as of 2025):

- CU Grand Paris Seine et Oise
- CA Cergy-Pontoise (partly)
- Communauté d'agglomération Rambouillet Territoires
- Communauté d'agglomération Saint Germain Boucles de Seine (partly)
- CA Saint-Quentin-en-Yvelines
- Communauté d'agglomération Versailles Grand Parc (partly)
- Communauté de communes Cœur d'Yvelines
- Communauté de communes Gally Mauldre
- Communauté de communes de la Haute Vallée de Chevreuse
- Communauté de communes du Pays Houdanais (partly)
- Communauté de communes des Portes de l'Île-de-France

(CAS) Communauté d'agglomération de Saint-Quentin-en-Yvelines, created in 2004

INSEE code	Postal code	Commune
78003	78660	Ablis
78005	78260	Achères
78006	78113	Adainville
78007	78240	Aigremont
78009	78660	Allainville
78010	78580	Les Alluets-le-Roi
78013	78770	Andelu
78015	78570	Andrésy
78020	78790	Arnouville-lès-Mantes
78029	78410	Aubergenville
78030	78610	Auffargis
78031	78930	Auffreville-Brasseuil
78033	78126	Aulnay-sur-Mauldre
78034	78770	Auteuil
78036	78770	Autouillet
78043	78870	Bailly
78048	78550	Bazainville
78049	78580	Bazemont
78050	78490	Bazoches-sur-Guyonne
78053	78910	Béhoust
78057	78270	Bennecourt
78062	78650	Beynes
78068	78270	Blaru
78070	78930	Boinville-en-Mantois
78071	78660	Boinville-le-Gaillard
78072	78200	Boinvilliers
78073	78390	Bois-d'Arcy
78076	78910	Boissets
78077	78125	La Boissière-École
78082	78200	Boissy-Mauvoisin
78084	78490	Boissy-sans-Avoir
78087	78830	Bonnelles
78089	78270	Bonnières-sur-Seine
78090	78410	Bouafle
78092	78380	Bougival
78096	78113	Bourdonné
78104	78930	Breuil-Bois-Robert
78107	78980	Bréval
78108	78610	Les Bréviaires
78113	78440	Brueil-en-Vexin
78117	78530	Buc
78118	78200	Buchelay
78120	78830	Bullion
78123	78955	Carrières-sous-Poissy
78124	78420	Carrières-sur-Seine
78125	78720	La Celle-les-Bordes
78126	78170	La Celle-Saint-Cloud
78128	78720	Cernay-la-Ville
78133	78240	Chambourcy
78138	78570	Chanteloup-les-Vignes
78140	78130	Chapet
78143	78117	Châteaufort
78146	78400	Chatou
78147	78270	Chaufour-lès-Bonnières
78152	78450	Chavenay
78158	78150	Le Chesnay-Rocquencourt
78160	78460	Chevreuse
78162	78460	Choisel
78163	78910	Civry-la-Forêt
78164	78120	Clairefontaine-en-Yvelines
78165	78340	Les Clayes-sous-Bois
78168	78310	Coignières
78171	78113	Condé-sur-Vesgre
78172	78700	Conflans-Sainte-Honorine
78185	78790	Courgent
78188	78270	Cravent
78189	78121	Crespières
78190	78290	Croissy-sur-Seine
78192	78111	Dammartin-en-Serve
78193	78720	Dampierre-en-Yvelines
78194	78550	Dannemarie
78196	78810	Davron
78202	78440	Drocourt
78206	78920	Ecquevilly
78208	78990	Élancourt
78209	78125	Émancé
78217	78680	Épône
78220	78690	Les Essarts-le-Roi
78224	78620	L'Étang-la-Ville
78227	78740	Évecquemont
78230	78410	La Falaise
78231	78200	Favrieux
78233	78810	Feucherolles
78234	78200	Flacourt
78236	78910	Flexanville
78237	78790	Flins-Neuve-Église
78238	78410	Flins-sur-Seine
78239	78520	Follainville-Dennemont
78242	78330	Fontenay-le-Fleury
78245	78200	Fontenay-Mauvoisin
78246	78440	Fontenay-Saint-Père
78255	78840	Freneuse
78261	78250	Gaillon-sur-Montcient
78262	78490	Galluis
78263	78950	Gambais
78264	78490	Gambaiseuil
78265	78890	Garancières
78267	78440	Gargenville
78269	78125	Gazeran
78276	78270	Gommecourt
78278	78770	Goupillières
78281	78930	Goussonville
78283	78113	Grandchamp
78285	78550	Gressey
78289	78490	Grosrouvre
78290	78520	Guernes
78291	78930	Guerville
78296	78440	Guitrancourt
78297	78280	Guyancourt
78299	78250	Hardricourt
78300	78790	Hargeville
78302	78113	La Hauteville
78305	78580	Herbeville
78307	78125	Hermeray
78310	78550	Houdan
78311	78800	Houilles
78314	78440	Issou
78317	78440	Jambville
78321	78760	Jouars-Pontchartrain
78322	78350	Jouy-en-Josas
78324	78200	Jouy-Mauvoisin
78325	78580	Jumeauville
78327	78820	Juziers
78329	78440	Lainville-en-Vexin
78334	78320	Lévis-Saint-Nom
78335	78520	Limay
78337	78270	Limetz-Villez
78343	78350	Les Loges-en-Josas
78344	78270	Lommoye

INSEE code	Postal code	Commune
78346	78980	Longnes
78349	78730	Longvilliers
78350	78430	Louveciennes
78354	78200	Magnanville
78356	78114	Magny-les-Hameaux
78358	78600	Maisons-Laffitte
78361	78200	Mantes-la-Jolie
78362	78200	Mantes-la-Ville
78364	78770	Marcq
78366	78490	Mareil-le-Guyon
78367	78750	Mareil-Marly
78368	78124	Mareil-sur-Mauldre
78372	78160	Marly-le-Roi
78380	78580	Maule
78381	78550	Maulette
78382	78780	Maurecourt
78383	78310	Maurepas
78384	78670	Médan
78385	78200	Ménerville
78389	78490	Méré
78391	78270	Méricourt
78396	78600	Le Mesnil-le-Roi
78397	78320	Le Mesnil-Saint-Denis
78398	78490	Les Mesnuls
78401	78250	Meulan-en-Yvelines
78402	78970	Mézières-sur-Seine
78403	78250	Mézy-sur-Seine
78404	78940	Millemont
78406	78470	Milon-la-Chapelle
78407	78125	Mittainville
78410	78840	Moisson
78413	78980	Mondreville
78415	78124	Montainville
78416	78440	Montalet-le-Bois
78417	78790	Montchauvet
78418	78360	Montesson
78420	78490	Montfort-l'Amaury
78423	78180	Montigny-le-Bretonneux
78431	78630	Morainvilliers
78437	78270	Mousseaux-sur-Seine
78439	78790	Mulcent
78440	78130	Les Mureaux
78442	78640	Neauphle-le-Château
78443	78640	Neauphle-le-Vieux
78444	78980	Neauphlette
78451	78410	Nézel
78455	78590	Noisy-le-Roi
78320	78270	Notre-Dame-de-la-Mer
78460	78250	Oinville-sur-Montcient
78464	78125	Orcemont
78465	78910	Orgerus
78466	78630	Orgeval
78470	78125	Orphin
78472	78660	Orsonville
78474	78910	Orvilliers
78475	78910	Osmoy
78478	78660	Paray-Douaville
78481	78230	Le Pecq
78484	78200	Perdreauville
78486	78610	Le Perray-en-Yvelines
78490	78370	Plaisir
78497	78125	Poigny-la-Forêt
78498	78300	Poissy
78499	78730	Ponthévrard
78501	78440	Porcheville
78502	78560	Le Port-Marly
78506	78660	Prunay-en-Yvelines
78505	78910	Prunay-le-Temple
78513	78940	La Queue-les-Yvelines
78516	78125	Raizeux
78517	78120	Rambouillet
78518	78590	Rennemoulin
78520	78550	Richebourg
78522	78730	Rochefort-en-Yvelines
78528	78270	Rolleboise
78530	78790	Rosay
78531	78710	Rosny-sur-Seine
78536	78440	Sailly
78537	78730	Saint-Arnoult-en-Yvelines
78545	78210	Saint-Cyr-l'École
78569	78730	Sainte-Mesme
78548	78720	Saint-Forget
78550	78640	Saint-Germain-de-la-Grange
78551	78100	Saint-Germain-en-Laye
78557	78125	Saint-Hilarion
78558	78980	Saint-Illiers-la-Ville
78559	78980	Saint-Illiers-le-Bois
78561	78470	Saint-Lambert
78562	78610	Saint-Léger-en-Yvelines
78564	78660	Saint-Martin-de-Bréthencourt
78565	78790	Saint-Martin-des-Champs
78567	78520	Saint-Martin-la-Garenne
78571	78860	Saint-Nom-la-Bretèche
78575	78470	Saint-Rémy-lès-Chevreuse
78576	78690	Saint-Rémy-l'Honoré
78586	78500	Sartrouville
78588	78650	Saulx-Marchais
78590	78720	Senlisse
78591	78790	Septeuil
78597	78200	Soindres
78601	78120	Sonchamp
78605	78910	Tacoignières
78606	78113	Le Tartre-Gaudran
78608	78980	Le Tertre-Saint-Denis
78609	78250	Tessancourt-sur-Aubette
78615	78850	Thiverval-Grignon
78616	78770	Thoiry
78618	78790	Tilly
78620	78117	Toussus-le-Noble
78621	78190	Trappes
78623	78490	Le Tremblay-sur-Mauldre
78624	78510	Triel-sur-Seine
78638	78740	Vaux-sur-Seine
78640	78140	Vélizy-Villacoublay
78642	78480	Verneuil-sur-Seine
78643	78540	Vernouillet
78644	78320	La Verrière
78646	78000	Versailles
78647	78930	Vert
78650	78110	Le Vésinet
78653	78490	Vicq
78655	78125	Vieille-Église-en-Yvelines
78668	78270	La Villeneuve-en-Chevrie
78672	78670	Villennes-sur-Seine
78674	78450	Villepreux
78677	78930	Villette
78681	78770	Villiers-le-Mahieu
78683	78640	Villiers-Saint-Frédéric
78686	78220	Viroflay
78688	78960	Voisins-le-Bretonneux
