= Arrondissement of Rambouillet =

Coordinates: 48°38′50″N 1°50′21″E

Rambouillet
- Arrondissement
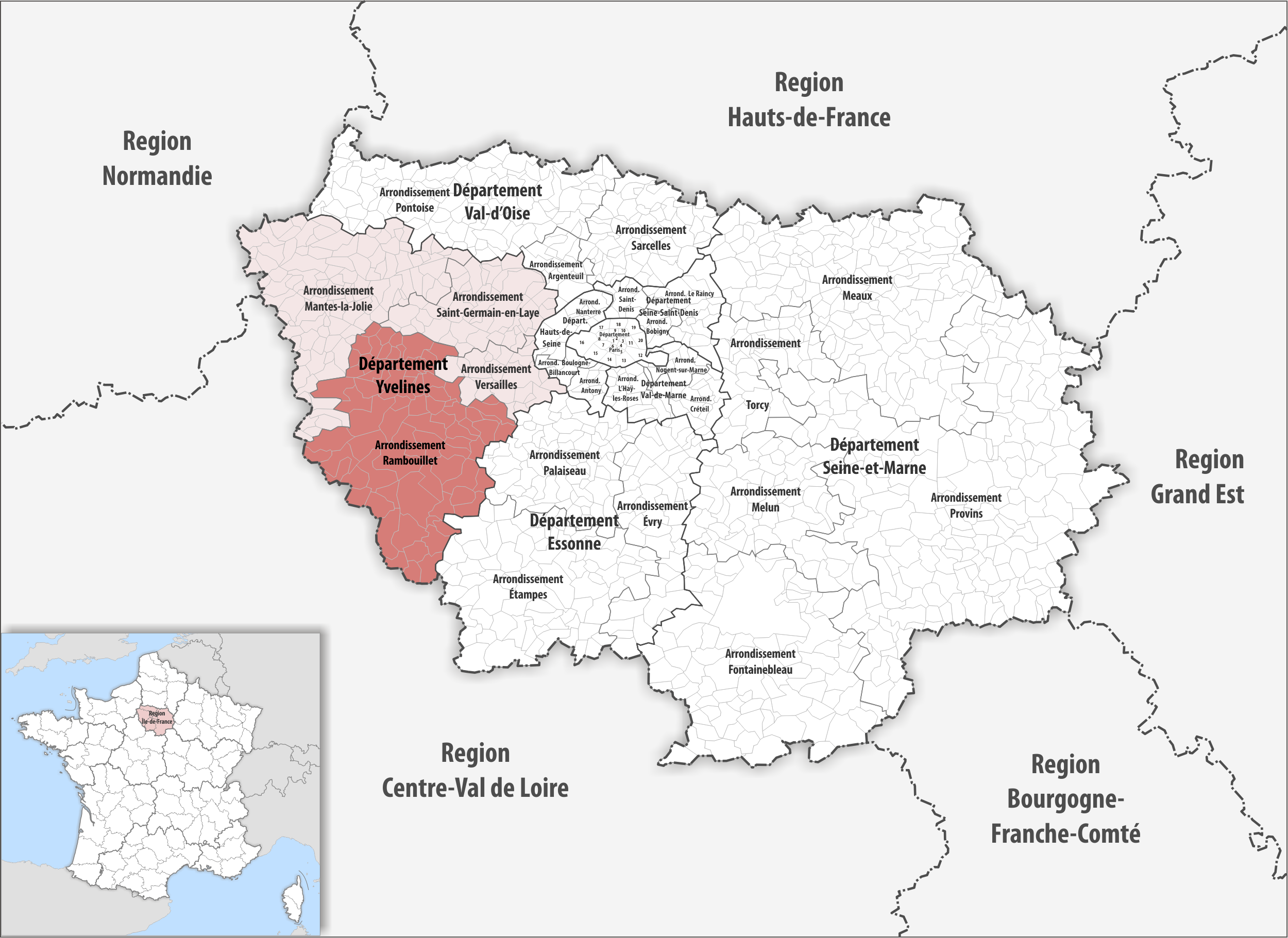
- Location within the region Île-de-France
- Country: France
- Region: Île-de-France
- Department: Yvelines
- No. of communes: {{{nbcomm}}}
- Area: 987.3 km^{2} (381.2 sq mi)
- Population (2023): 235,520
  - Density: 238.5/km^{2} (617.8/sq mi)
- INSEE code: 782

The arrondissement of Rambouillet is an arrondissement of France in the Yvelines department in the Île-de-France region. It has 83 communes. Its population is 230,545 (2021), and its area is 987.3 km^{2} (381.2 sq mi).

== Composition ==
The communes of the arrondissement of Rambouillet, and their INSEE codes, are:

1. Ablis (78003)
2. Allainville (78009)
3. Auffargis (78030)
4. Auteuil (78034)
5. Autouillet (78036)
6. Bazoches-sur-Guyonne (78050)
7. Béhoust (78053)
8. Beynes (78062)
9. Boinville-le-Gaillard (78071)
10. La Boissière-École (78077)
11. Boissy-sans-Avoir (78084)
12. Bonnelles (78087)
13. Les Bréviaires (78108)
14. Bullion (78120)
15. La Celle-les-Bordes (78125)
16. Cernay-la-Ville (78128)
17. Chevreuse (78160)
18. Choisel (78162)
19. Clairefontaine-en-Yvelines (78164)
20. Coignières (78168)
21. Dampierre-en-Yvelines (78193)
22. Élancourt (78208)
23. Émancé (78209)
24. Les Essarts-le-Roi (78220)
25. Flexanville (78236)
26. Galluis (78262)
27. Gambais (78263)
28. Gambaiseuil (78264)
29. Garancières (78265)
30. Gazeran (78269)
31. Goupillières (78278)
32. Grosrouvre (78289)
33. Hermeray (78307)
34. Jouars-Pontchartrain (78321)
35. Lévis-Saint-Nom (78334)
36. Longvilliers (78349)
37. Magny-les-Hameaux (78356)
38. Marcq (78364)
39. Mareil-le-Guyon (78366)
40. Maurepas (78383)
41. Méré (78389)
42. Le Mesnil-Saint-Denis (78397)
43. Les Mesnuls (78398)
44. Millemont (78404)
45. Milon-la-Chapelle (78406)
46. Mittainville (78407)
47. Montfort-l'Amaury (78420)
48. Neauphle-le-Château (78442)
49. Neauphle-le-Vieux (78443)
50. Orcemont (78464)
51. Orphin (78470)
52. Orsonville (78472)
53. Paray-Douaville (78478)
54. Le Perray-en-Yvelines (78486)
55. Poigny-la-Forêt (78497)
56. Ponthévrard (78499)
57. Prunay-en-Yvelines (78506)
58. La Queue-les-Yvelines (78513)
59. Raizeux (78516)
60. Rambouillet (78517)
61. Rochefort-en-Yvelines (78522)
62. Saint-Arnoult-en-Yvelines (78537)
63. Sainte-Mesme (78569)
64. Saint-Forget (78548)
65. Saint-Germain-de-la-Grange (78550)
66. Saint-Hilarion (78557)
67. Saint-Lambert (78561)
68. Saint-Léger-en-Yvelines (78562)
69. Saint-Martin-de-Bréthencourt (78564)
70. Saint-Rémy-lès-Chevreuse (78575)
71. Saint-Rémy-l'Honoré (78576)
72. Saulx-Marchais (78588)
73. Senlisse (78590)
74. Sonchamp (78601)
75. Thiverval-Grignon (78615)
76. Thoiry (78616)
77. Le Tremblay-sur-Mauldre (78623)
78. La Verrière (78644)
79. Vicq (78653)
80. Vieille-Église-en-Yvelines (78655)
81. Villiers-le-Mahieu (78681)
82. Villiers-Saint-Frédéric (78683)
83. Voisins-le-Bretonneux (78688)

== History ==
The arrondissement of Rambouillet was created in 1812 as part of the department Seine-et-Oise. In 1968 it became part of the new department Yvelines. At the January 2017 reorganisation of the arrondissements of Seine-et-Marne, it received one commune from the arrondissement of Mantes-la-Jolie and one commune from the arrondissement of Versailles.

As a result of the reorganisation of the cantons of France which came into effect in 2015, the borders of the cantons are no longer related to the borders of the arrondissements. The cantons of the arrondissement of Rambouillet were, as of January 2015:

1. Chevreuse
2. Maurepas
3. Montfort-l'Amaury
4. Rambouillet
5. Saint-Arnoult-en-Yvelines
