= Saint-Lambert, Yvelines =

Saint-Lambert
- Commune
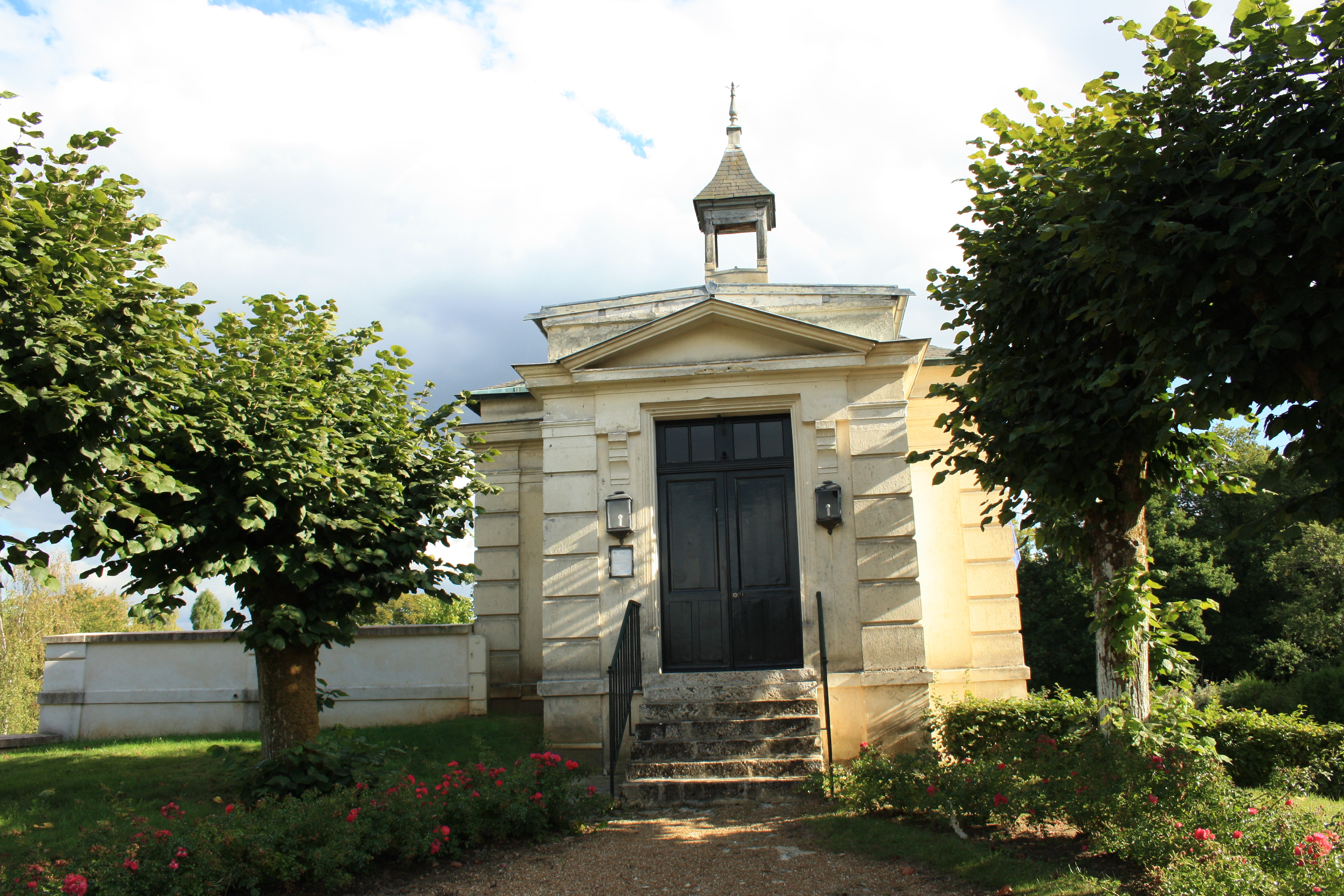
- Town hall

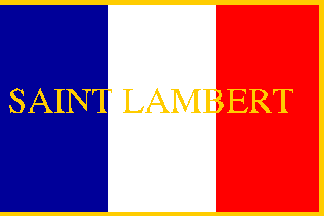
- Flag
- Location of Saint-Lambert
- Location within France Location within Île-de-France (region)
- Coordinates: 48°43′57″N 2°01′18″E
- Country: France
- Region: Île-de-France
- Department: Yvelines
- Arrondissement: Rambouillet
- Canton: Maurepas

Government
  - Mayor (2020–2026): Olivier Bedouelle
- Area^{1}: 6.61 km^{2} (2.55 sq mi)
- Elevation: 106 m (348 ft)
- Highest elevation: 169 m (554 ft)
- Lowest elevation: 95 m (312 ft)
- Population (2023): 447
  - Density: 67.6/km^{2} (175/sq mi)
- Time zone: UTC+01:00 (CET)
  - Summer (DST): UTC+02:00 (CEST)
- INSEE/Postal code: 78561 /78470
- ^{1} French Land Register data, which excludes lakes, ponds, glaciers > 1 km^{2} (0.386 sq mi or 247 acres) and river estuaries.

Saint-Lambert (French pronunciation: [sɛ̃ lɑ̃bɛʁ]) is a commune in the Yvelines department in the Île-de-France in north-central France.

== See also ==
- Communes of the Yvelines department
