= Bullion, Yvelines =

Bullion
- Commune
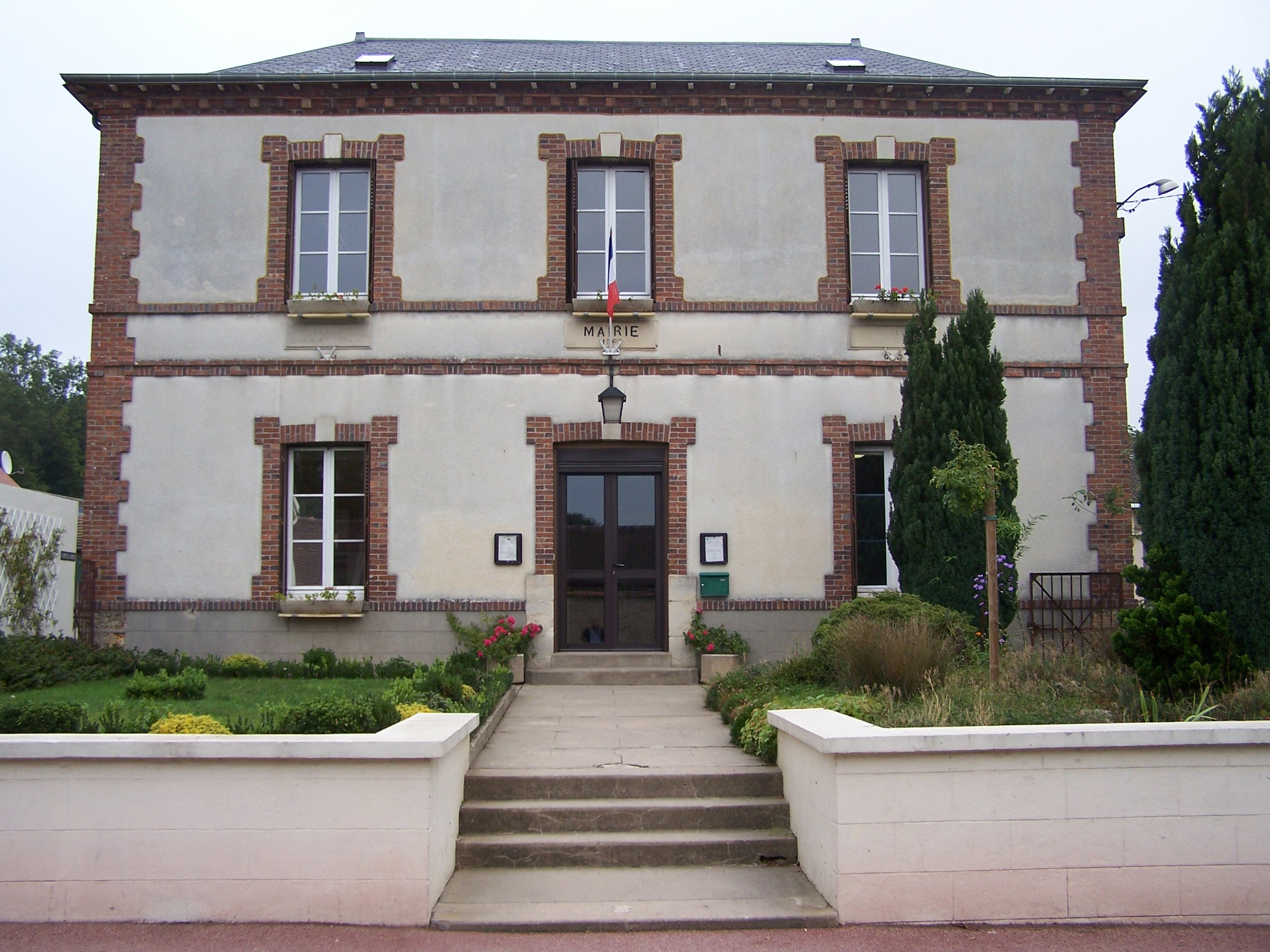
- Town hall

- Coat of arms
- Location of Bullion
- Location within France Location within Île-de-France (region)
- Coordinates: 48°37′22″N 1°59′48″E
- Country: France
- Region: Île-de-France
- Department: Yvelines
- Arrondissement: Rambouillet
- Canton: Rambouillet
- Intercommunality: CA Rambouillet Territoires

Government
  - Mayor (2020–2026): Xavier Caris
- Area^{1}: 20.9 km^{2} (8.1 sq mi)
- Elevation: 104 m (341 ft)
- Highest elevation: 178 m (584 ft)
- Lowest elevation: 93 m (305 ft)
- Population (2023): 1,916
  - Density: 91.7/km^{2} (237/sq mi)
- Time zone: UTC+01:00 (CET)
  - Summer (DST): UTC+02:00 (CEST)
- INSEE/Postal code: 78120 /78830
- ^{1} French Land Register data, which excludes lakes, ponds, glaciers > 1 km^{2} (0.386 sq mi or 247 acres) and river estuaries.

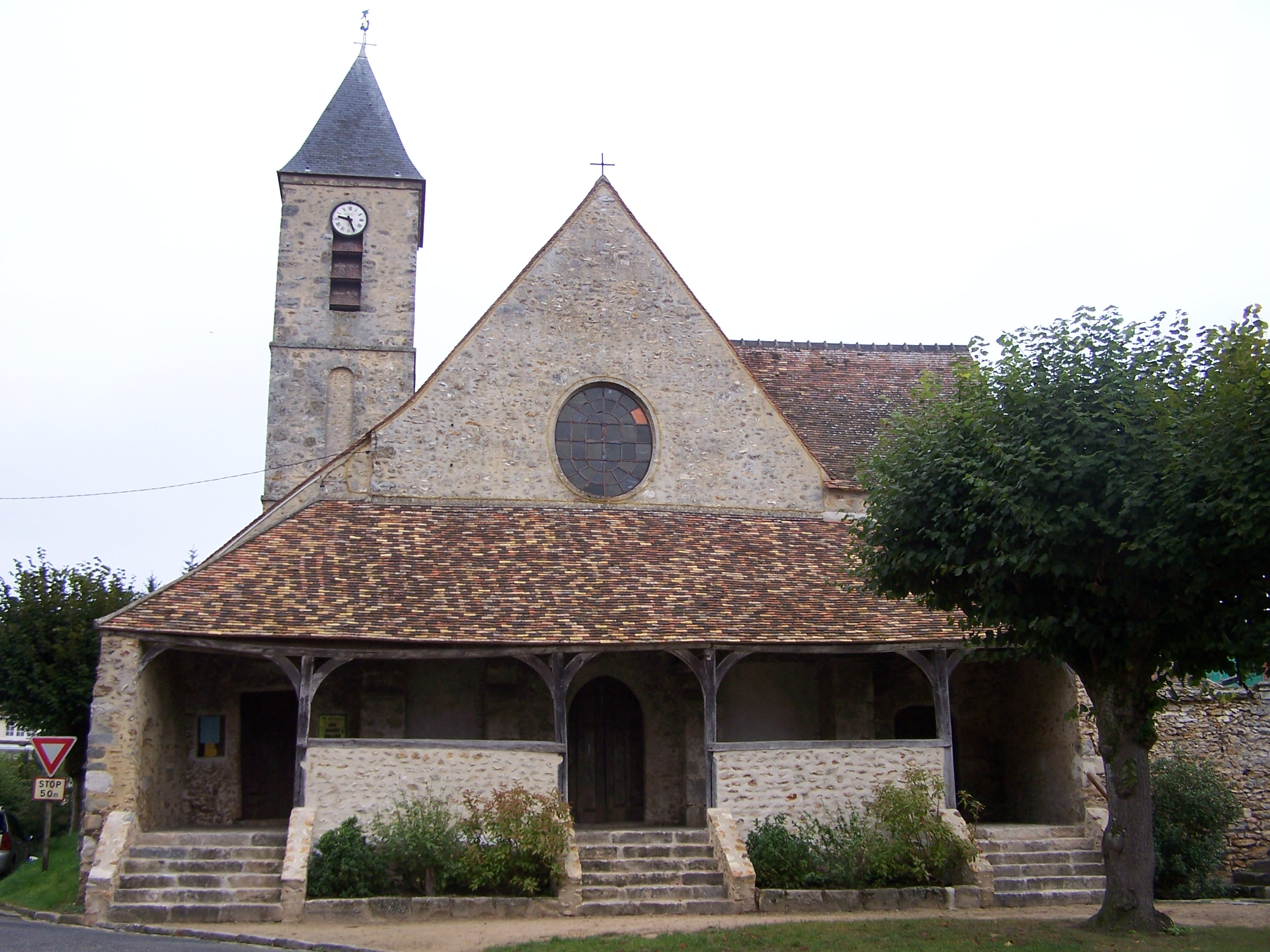
Saint-Vincent Saint-Sébastien

Bullion (French pronunciation: [byljɔ̃]) is a commune in the Yvelines department in the Île-de-France region in north-central France.

== See also ==
- Communes of the Yvelines department
