= Mittainville =

- Commune
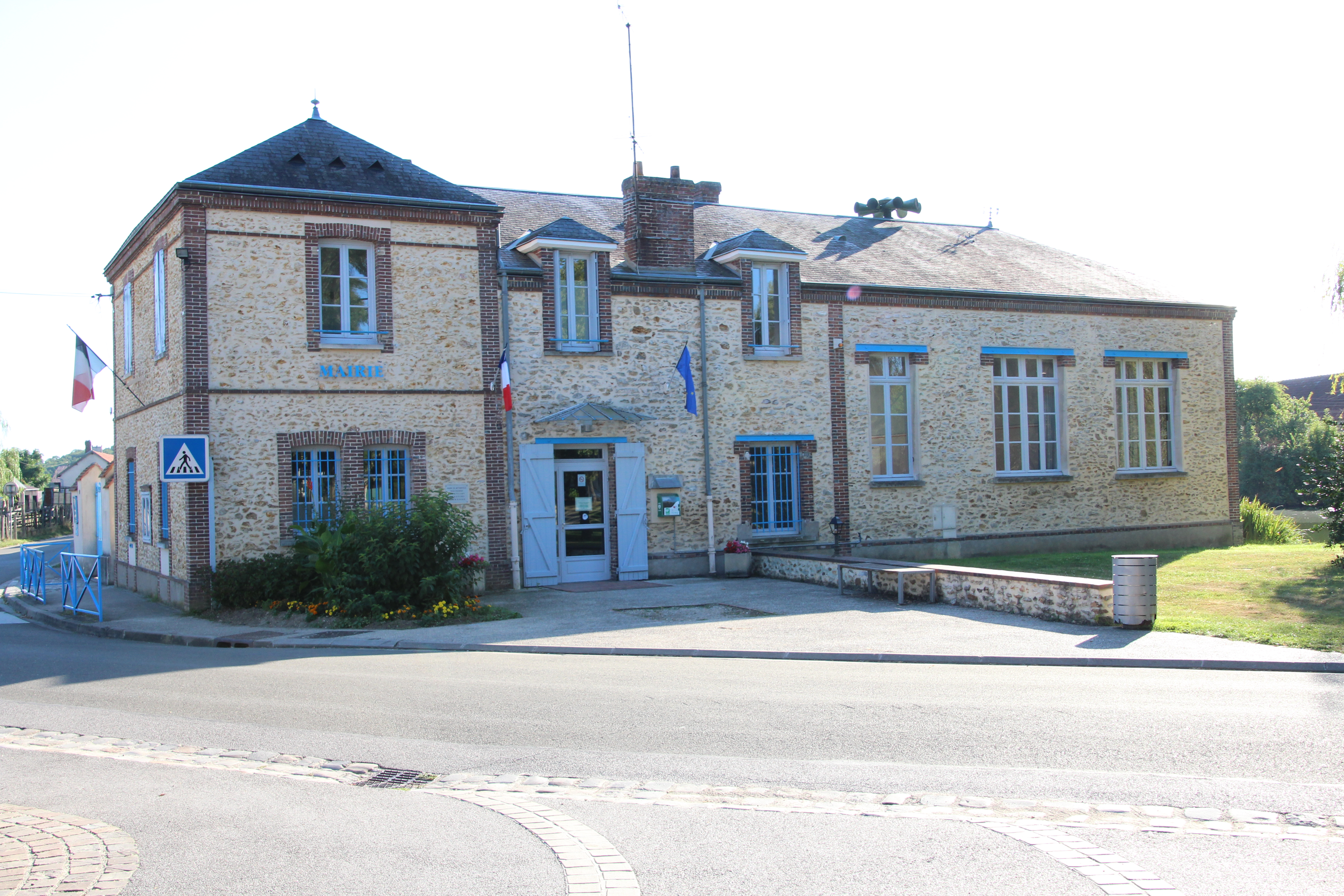
- The town hall in Mittainville

- Coat of arms
- Location of Mittainville
- Location within France Location within Île-de-France (region)
- Coordinates: 48°39′59″N 1°37′23″E
- Country: France
- Region: Île-de-France
- Department: Yvelines
- Arrondissement: Rambouillet
- Canton: Rambouillet
- Intercommunality: CA Rambouillet Territoires

Government
  - Mayor (2020–2026): Corinne Rostan
- Area^{1}: 10.51 km^{2} (4.06 sq mi)
- Elevation: 137 m (449 ft)
- Highest elevation: 174 m (571 ft)
- Lowest elevation: 121 m (397 ft)
- Population (2023): 659
  - Density: 62.7/km^{2} (162/sq mi)
- Time zone: UTC+01:00 (CET)
  - Summer (DST): UTC+02:00 (CEST)
- INSEE/Postal code: 78407 /78125
- ^{1} French Land Register data, which excludes lakes, ponds, glaciers > 1 km^{2} (0.386 sq mi or 247 acres) and river estuaries.

Mittainville (French: [mitɛ̃vil]) is a commune in the Yvelines department in the Île-de-France region of north-central France.

== See also ==
- Communes of the Yvelines department
