= Goupillières, Yvelines =

Goupillières
- Commune
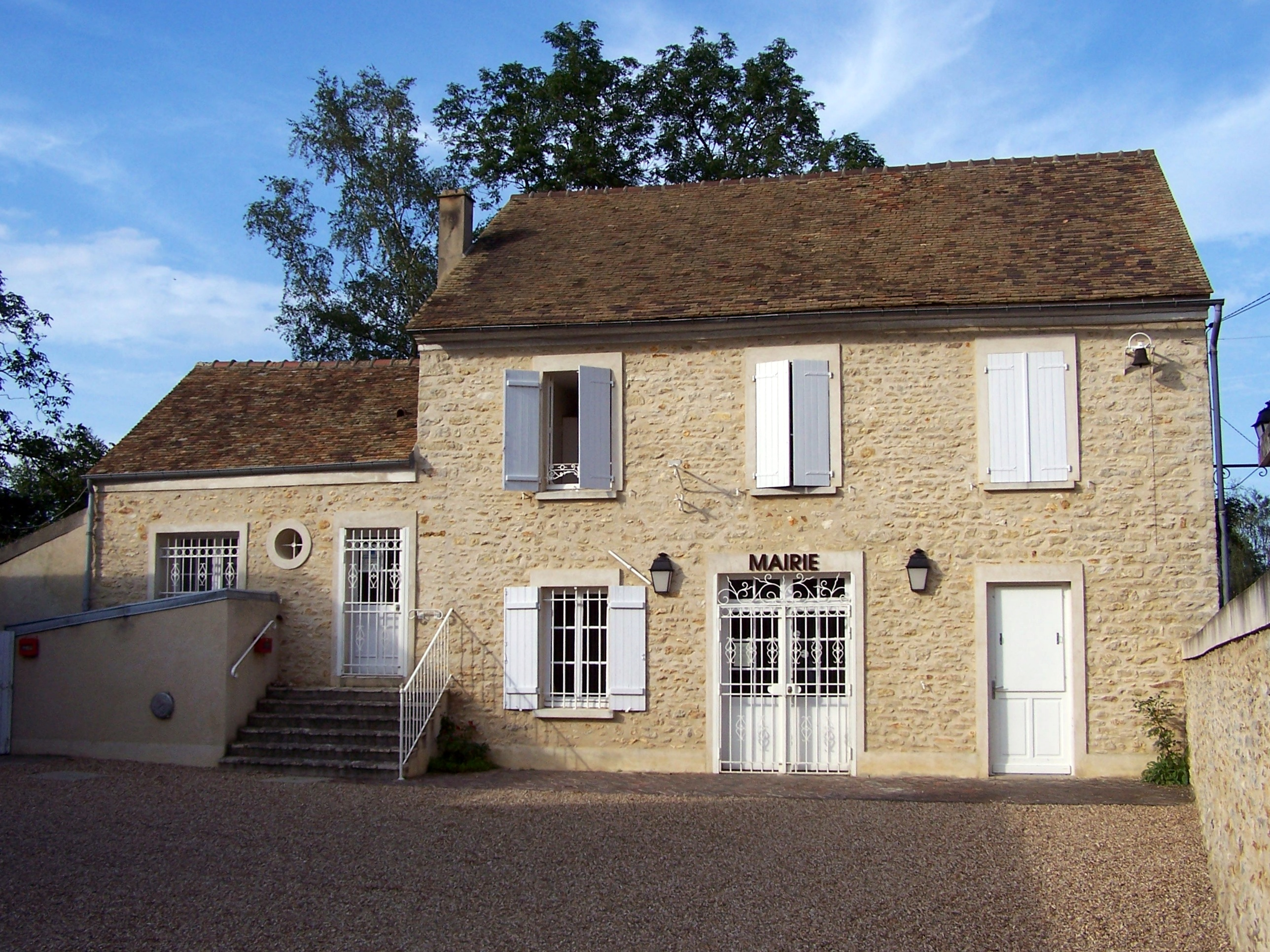
- Town hall
- Location of Goupillières
- Location within France Location within Île-de-France (region)
- Coordinates: 48°52′50″N 1°45′57″E
- Country: France
- Region: Île-de-France
- Department: Yvelines
- Arrondissement: Rambouillet
- Canton: Aubergenville

Government
  - Mayor (2020–2026): Régine François
- Area^{1}: 5.63 km^{2} (2.17 sq mi)
- Elevation: 150 m (490 ft)
- Highest elevation: 188 m (617 ft)
- Lowest elevation: 87 m (285 ft)
- Population (2023): 570
  - Density: 100/km^{2} (260/sq mi)
- Time zone: UTC+01:00 (CET)
  - Summer (DST): UTC+02:00 (CEST)
- INSEE/Postal code: 78278 /78770
- ^{1} French Land Register data, which excludes lakes, ponds, glaciers > 1 km^{2} (0.386 sq mi or 247 acres) and river estuaries.

Goupillières (French pronunciation: [ɡupijɛʁ]) is a commune in the Yvelines department in the Île-de-France region in north-central France.

== See also ==
- Communes of the Yvelines department
