= Poigny-la-Forêt =

- Commune
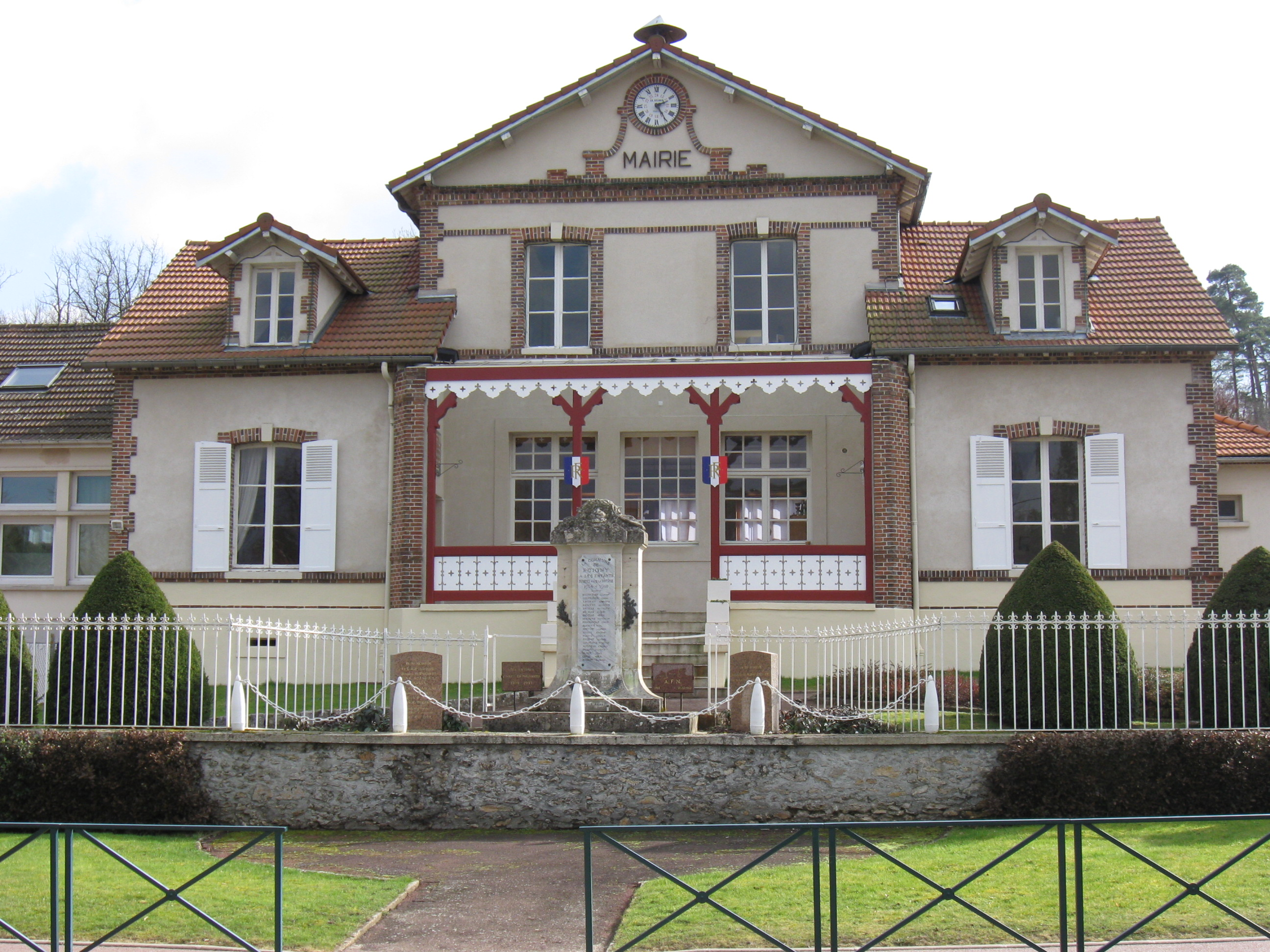
- The town hall and school in Poigny-la-Forêt

- Coat of arms
- Location of Poigny-la-Forêt
- Location within France Location within Île-de-France (region)
- Coordinates: 48°40′43″N 1°45′16″E
- Country: France
- Region: Île-de-France
- Department: Yvelines
- Arrondissement: Rambouillet
- Canton: Rambouillet
- Intercommunality: CA Rambouillet Territoires

Government
  - Mayor (2020–2026): Thierry Convert
- Area^{1}: 23.27 km^{2} (8.98 sq mi)
- Elevation: 160 m (520 ft)
- Highest elevation: 179 m (587 ft)
- Lowest elevation: 132 m (433 ft)
- Population (2023): 957
  - Density: 41.1/km^{2} (107/sq mi)
- Time zone: UTC+01:00 (CET)
  - Summer (DST): UTC+02:00 (CEST)
- INSEE/Postal code: 78497 /78125
- ^{1} French Land Register data, which excludes lakes, ponds, glaciers > 1 km^{2} (0.386 sq mi or 247 acres) and river estuaries.

Poigny-la-Forêt (French pronunciation: [pwaɲi la fɔʁɛ]) is a commune in the Yvelines department in the Île-de-France in north-central France.

== History ==
The name of the town comes from the Celtic word Pugneis meaning "clearing in the woods."

In the twelfth century, the Order of Grandmont (Haute-Vienne) founded the priory of Notre-Dame-des-Moulineaux. In 1317, following the reorganization of the Order, it became part of Ouye (see Dourdan). In 1576, the family of Angennes Poigny who ruled, built a castle. From 1643 the site has been in disrepair. Today, you can still see the choir of the church and the remains of the wall along the D107 near the rocks Angennes.

== Demographics ==
Historical population
| Year | Pop. | ±% p.a. |
|---|---|---|
| 1968 | 402 | — |
| 1975 | 526 | +3.92% |
| 1982 | 616 | +2.28% |
| 1990 | 825 | +3.72% |
| 1999 | 872 | +0.62% |
| 2007 | 1,014 | +1.90% |
| 2012 | 983 | −0.62% |
| 2017 | 931 | −1.08% |
| 2023 | 957 | +0.46% |
Source: INSEE

== See also ==
- Communes of the Yvelines department
