= Sonchamp =

- Commune
- Location of Sonchamp
- Location within France Location within Île-de-France (region)
- Coordinates: 48°34′36″N 1°52′43″E
- Country: France
- Region: Île-de-France
- Department: Yvelines
- Arrondissement: Rambouillet
- Canton: Rambouillet
- Intercommunality: CA Rambouillet Territoires

Government
  - Mayor (2020–2026): Ysabelle May-Ott
- Area^{1}: 46.49 km^{2} (17.95 sq mi)
- Elevation: 151 m (495 ft)
- Highest elevation: 172 m (564 ft)
- Lowest elevation: 121 m (397 ft)
- Population (2023): 1,678
  - Density: 36.09/km^{2} (93.48/sq mi)
- Time zone: UTC+01:00 (CET)
  - Summer (DST): UTC+02:00 (CEST)
- INSEE/Postal code: 78601 /78120
- ^{1} French Land Register data, which excludes lakes, ponds, glaciers > 1 km^{2} (0.386 sq mi or 247 acres) and river estuaries.

Sonchamp (French pronunciation: [sɔ̃ʃɑ̃]) is a commune in the Yvelines department in the Île-de-France in north-central France.

== See also ==
- Communes of the Yvelines department
