= Saulx-Marchais =

- Commune
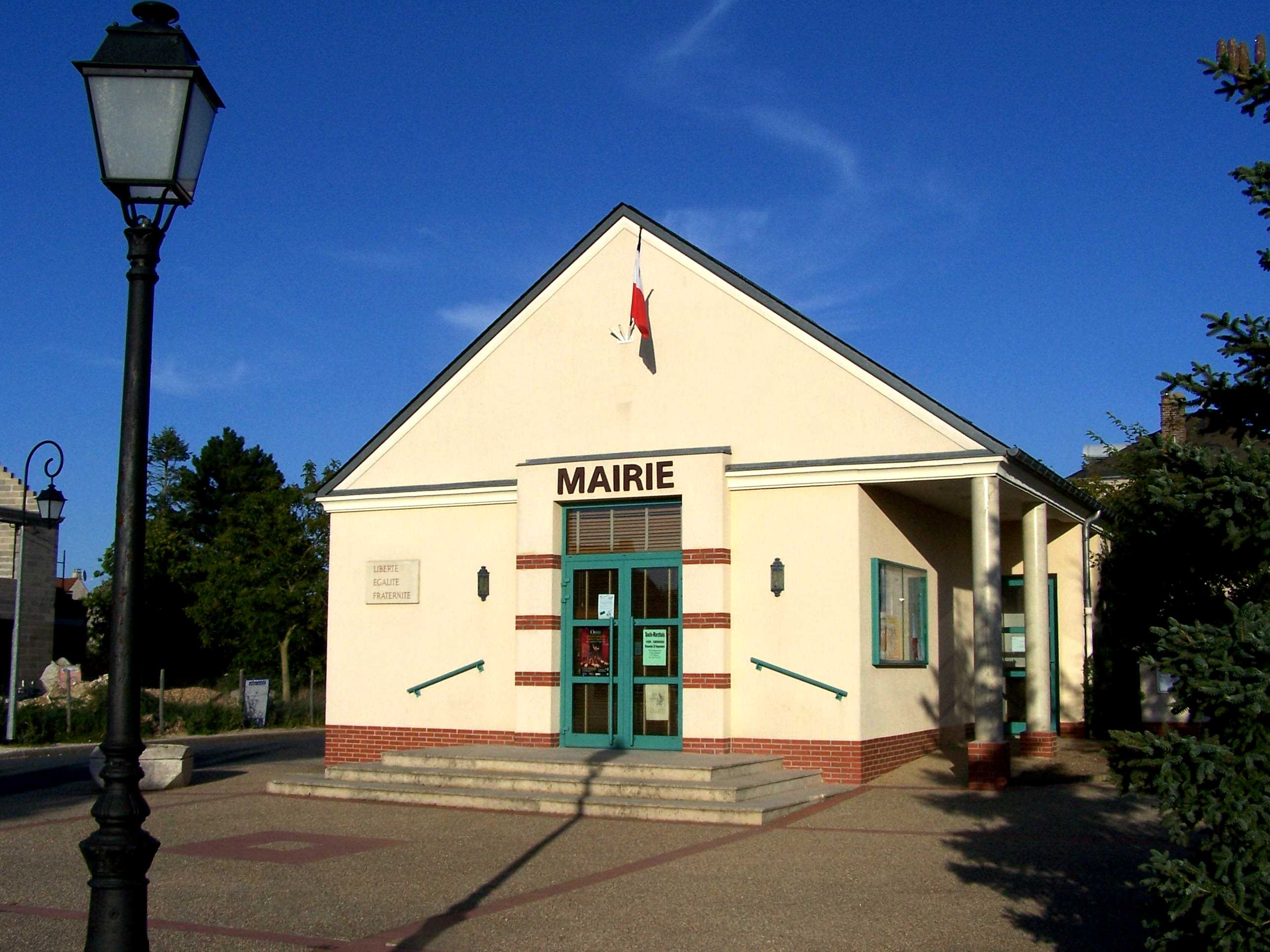
- Town hall

- Coat of arms
- Location of Saulx-Marchais
- Location within France Location within Île-de-France (region)
- Coordinates: 48°50′27″N 1°50′12″E
- Country: France
- Region: Île-de-France
- Department: Yvelines
- Arrondissement: Rambouillet
- Canton: Aubergenville
- Intercommunality: Cœur d'Yvelines

Government
  - Mayor (2020–2026): Jacques Chaumette
- Area^{1}: 2.13 km^{2} (0.82 sq mi)
- Elevation: 123 m (404 ft)
- Highest elevation: 146 m (479 ft)
- Lowest elevation: 94 m (308 ft)
- Population (2023): 950
  - Density: 450/km^{2} (1,200/sq mi)
- Demonym: Marcasalucéens
- Time zone: UTC+01:00 (CET)
  - Summer (DST): UTC+02:00 (CEST)
- INSEE/Postal code: 78588 /78650
- ^{1} French Land Register data, which excludes lakes, ponds, glaciers > 1 km^{2} (0.386 sq mi or 247 acres) and river estuaries.

Saulx-Marchais (French pronunciation: [so maʁʃɛ]) is a commune in the Yvelines department in the Île-de-France in north-central France.

== See also ==
- Communes of the Yvelines department
