= Gambaiseuil =

- Commune
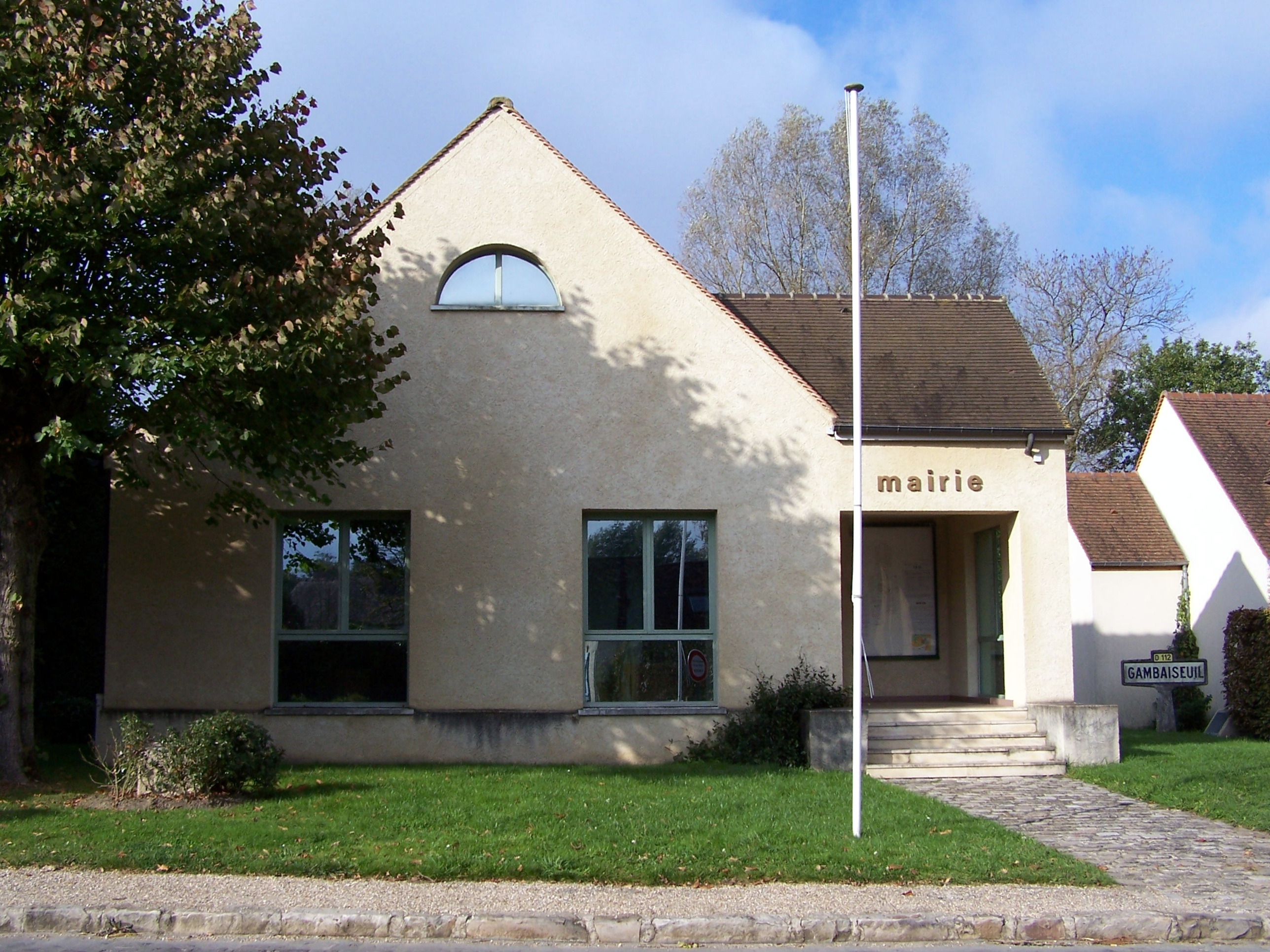
- Town hall
- Location of Gambaiseuil
- Location within France Location within Île-de-France (region)
- Coordinates: 48°45′27″N 1°43′59″E
- Country: France
- Region: Île-de-France
- Department: Yvelines
- Arrondissement: Rambouillet
- Canton: Rambouillet
- Intercommunality: CA Rambouillet Territoires

Government
  - Mayor (2020–2026): Claude Cazaneuve
- Area^{1}: 18.92 km^{2} (7.31 sq mi)
- Elevation: 129 m (423 ft)
- Highest elevation: 184 m (604 ft)
- Lowest elevation: 109 m (358 ft)
- Population (2023): 64
  - Density: 3.4/km^{2} (8.8/sq mi)
- Time zone: UTC+01:00 (CET)
  - Summer (DST): UTC+02:00 (CEST)
- INSEE/Postal code: 78264 /78490
- ^{1} French Land Register data, which excludes lakes, ponds, glaciers > 1 km^{2} (0.386 sq mi or 247 acres) and river estuaries.

Gambaiseuil (French pronunciation: [ɡɑ̃bɛzœj]) is a commune in the Yvelines department in the Île-de-France region in north-central France.

== See also ==
- Communes of the Yvelines department
