= Saint-Hilarion =

- Commune
- Location of Saint-Hilarion
- Location within France Location within Île-de-France (region)
- Coordinates: 48°37′16″N 1°44′03″E
- Country: France
- Region: Île-de-France
- Department: Yvelines
- Arrondissement: Rambouillet
- Canton: Rambouillet
- Intercommunality: CA Rambouillet Territoires

Government
  - Mayor (2020–2026): Jean-Claude Batteux
- Area^{1}: 14.00 km^{2} (5.41 sq mi)
- Elevation: 150 m (490 ft)
- Highest elevation: 169 m (554 ft)
- Lowest elevation: 114 m (374 ft)
- Population (2023): 999
  - Density: 71.4/km^{2} (185/sq mi)
- Time zone: UTC+01:00 (CET)
  - Summer (DST): UTC+02:00 (CEST)
- INSEE/Postal code: 78557 /78120
- ^{1} French Land Register data, which excludes lakes, ponds, glaciers > 1 km^{2} (0.386 sq mi or 247 acres) and river estuaries.

Saint-Hilarion (French pronunciation: [sɛ̃t‿ilaʁjɔ̃]) is a commune in the Yvelines department in the Île-de-France region in north-central France.

== See also ==
- Communes of the Yvelines department
