= Raizeux =

- Commune
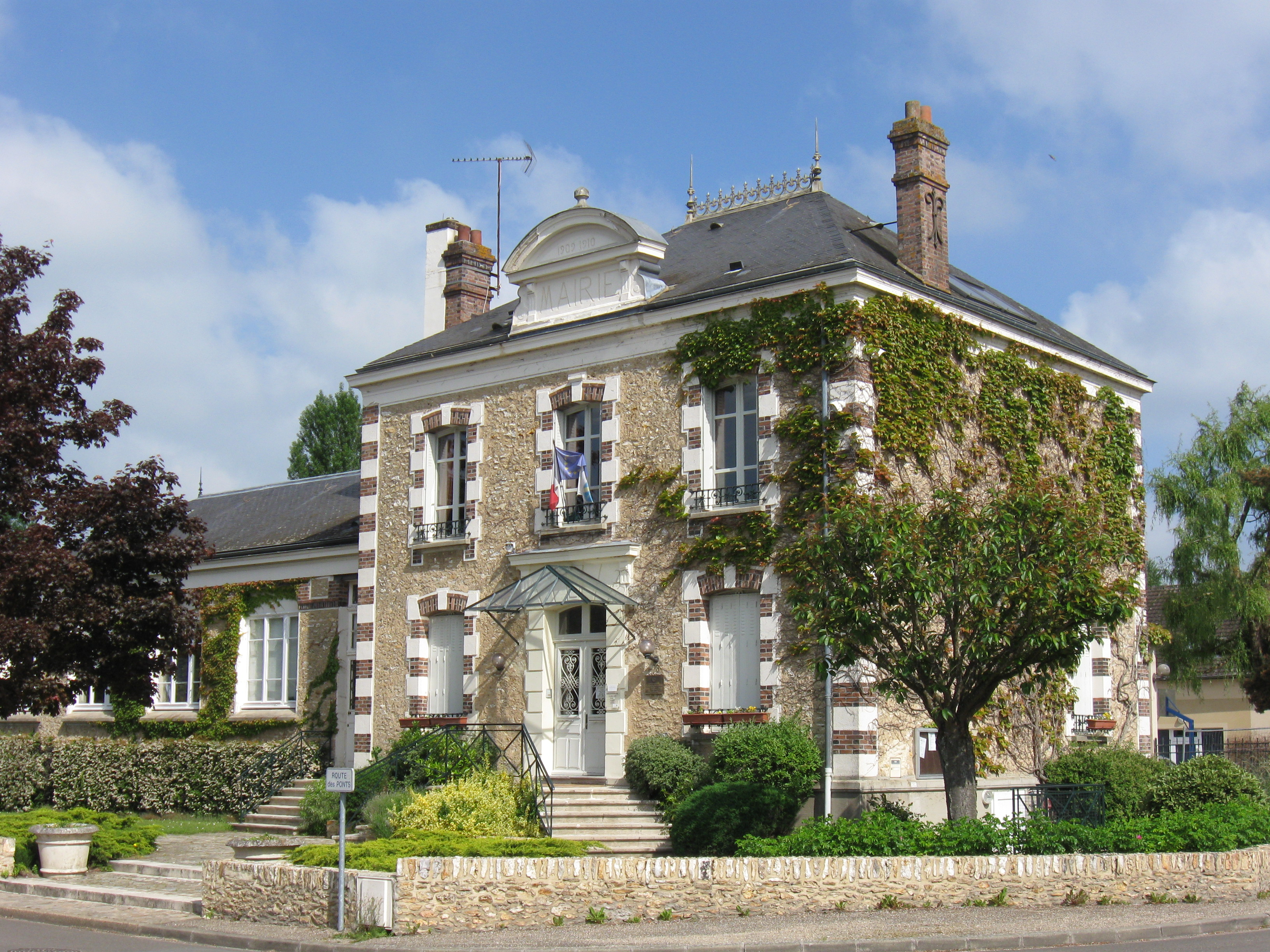
- Town hall

- Coat of arms
- Location of Raizeux
- Location within France Location within Île-de-France (region)
- Coordinates: 48°37′30″N 1°41′03″E
- Country: France
- Region: Île-de-France
- Department: Yvelines
- Arrondissement: Rambouillet
- Canton: Rambouillet
- Intercommunality: CA Rambouillet Territoires

Government
  - Mayor (2020–2026): Jean-Pierre Zannier
- Area^{1}: 10.25 km^{2} (3.96 sq mi)
- Elevation: 137 m (449 ft)
- Highest elevation: 171 m (561 ft)
- Lowest elevation: 115 m (377 ft)
- Population (2023): 970
  - Density: 95/km^{2} (250/sq mi)
- Time zone: UTC+01:00 (CET)
  - Summer (DST): UTC+02:00 (CEST)
- INSEE/Postal code: 78516 /78125
- ^{1} French Land Register data, which excludes lakes, ponds, glaciers > 1 km^{2} (0.386 sq mi or 247 acres) and river estuaries.

Raizeux (French: [ʁɛzø]) is a commune in the Yvelines department in the Île-de-France in north-central France.

== See also ==
- Communes of the Yvelines department
