= Orphin =

- Commune
- Coat of arms
- Location of Orphin
- Location within France Location within Île-de-France (region)
- Coordinates: 48°34′46″N 1°46′55″E
- Country: France
- Region: Île-de-France
- Department: Yvelines
- Arrondissement: Rambouillet
- Canton: Rambouillet
- Intercommunality: CA Rambouillet Territoires

Government
  - Mayor (2020–2026): Janny Demichelis
- Area^{1}: 16.50 km^{2} (6.37 sq mi)
- Elevation: 159 m (522 ft)
- Highest elevation: 166 m (545 ft)
- Lowest elevation: 132 m (433 ft)
- Population (2023): 875
  - Density: 53.0/km^{2} (137/sq mi)
- Time zone: UTC+01:00 (CET)
  - Summer (DST): UTC+02:00 (CEST)
- INSEE/Postal code: 78470 /78125
- ^{1} French Land Register data, which excludes lakes, ponds, glaciers > 1 km^{2} (0.386 sq mi or 247 acres) and river estuaries.

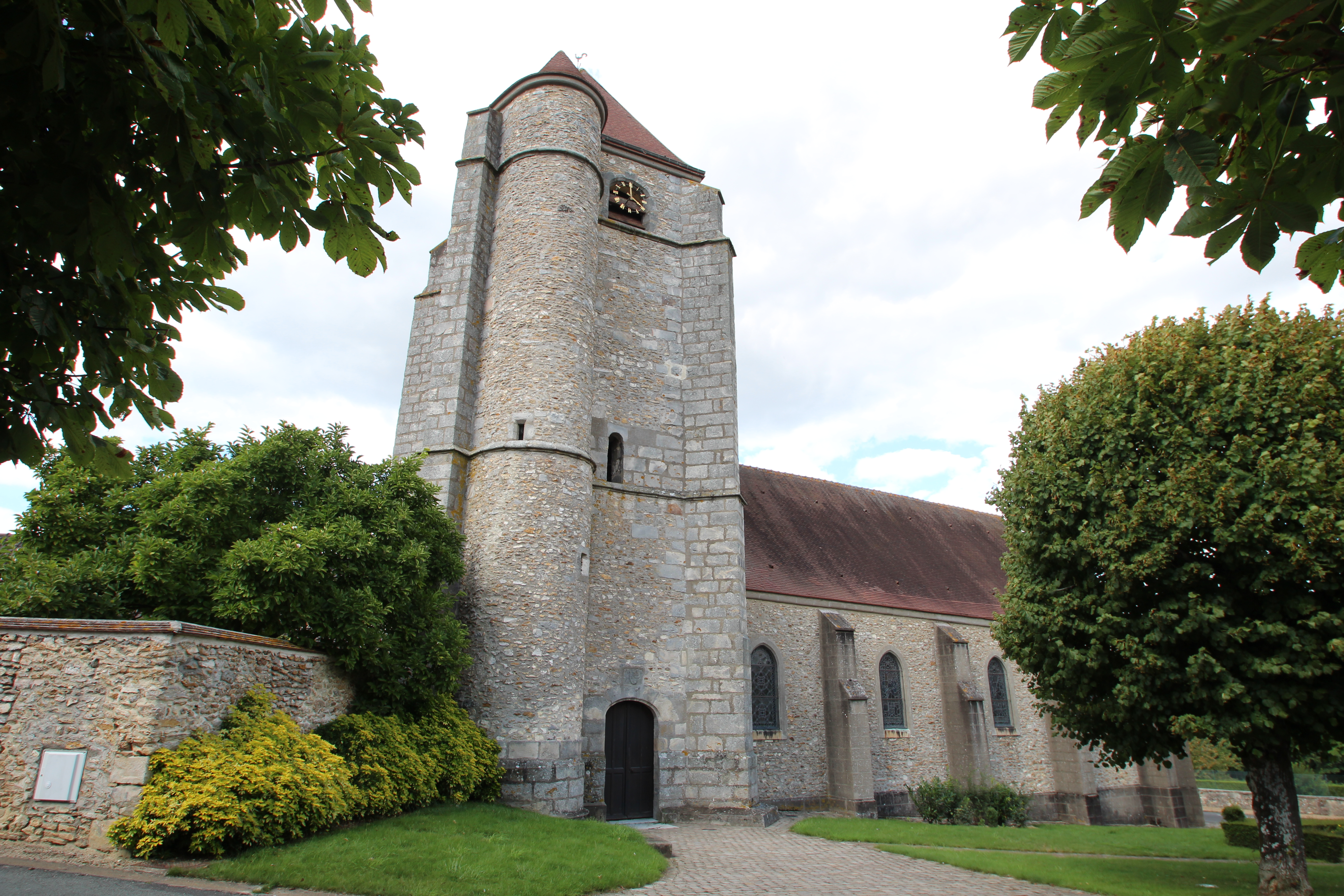
Sainte-Monégonde Church

Orphin (French pronunciation: [ɔʁfɛ̃]) is a commune in the Yvelines department in the Île-de-France region in north-central France.

== See also ==
- Communes of the Yvelines department
