= Paray-Douaville =

- Commune
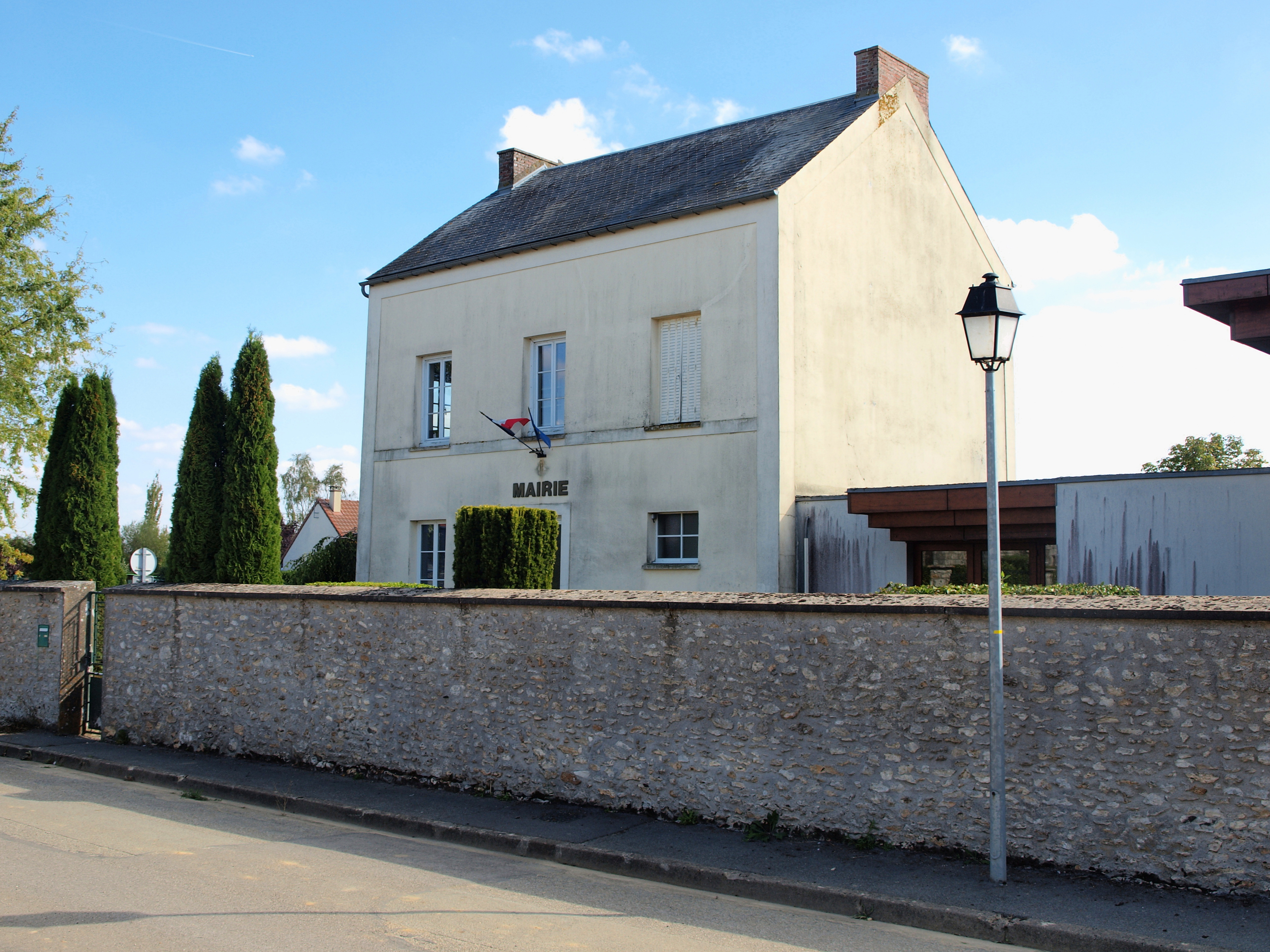
- Town hall
- Location of Paray-Douaville
- Location within France Location within Île-de-France (region)
- Coordinates: 48°27′51″N 1°52′42″E
- Country: France
- Region: Île-de-France
- Department: Yvelines
- Arrondissement: Rambouillet
- Canton: Rambouillet
- Intercommunality: CA Rambouillet Territoires

Government
  - Mayor (2020–2026): Martial Alix
- Area^{1}: 10.28 km^{2} (3.97 sq mi)
- Elevation: 155 m (509 ft)
- Highest elevation: 159 m (522 ft)
- Lowest elevation: 143 m (469 ft)
- Population (2023): 218
  - Density: 21.2/km^{2} (54.9/sq mi)
- Time zone: UTC+01:00 (CET)
  - Summer (DST): UTC+02:00 (CEST)
- INSEE/Postal code: 78478 /78660
- ^{1} French Land Register data, which excludes lakes, ponds, glaciers > 1 km^{2} (0.386 sq mi or 247 acres) and river estuaries.

Paray-Douaville (French pronunciation: [paʁɛ dwavil]) is a commune in the Yvelines department in the Île-de-France region in north-central France.

== See also ==
- Communes of the Yvelines department
