= Gazeran =

- Commune
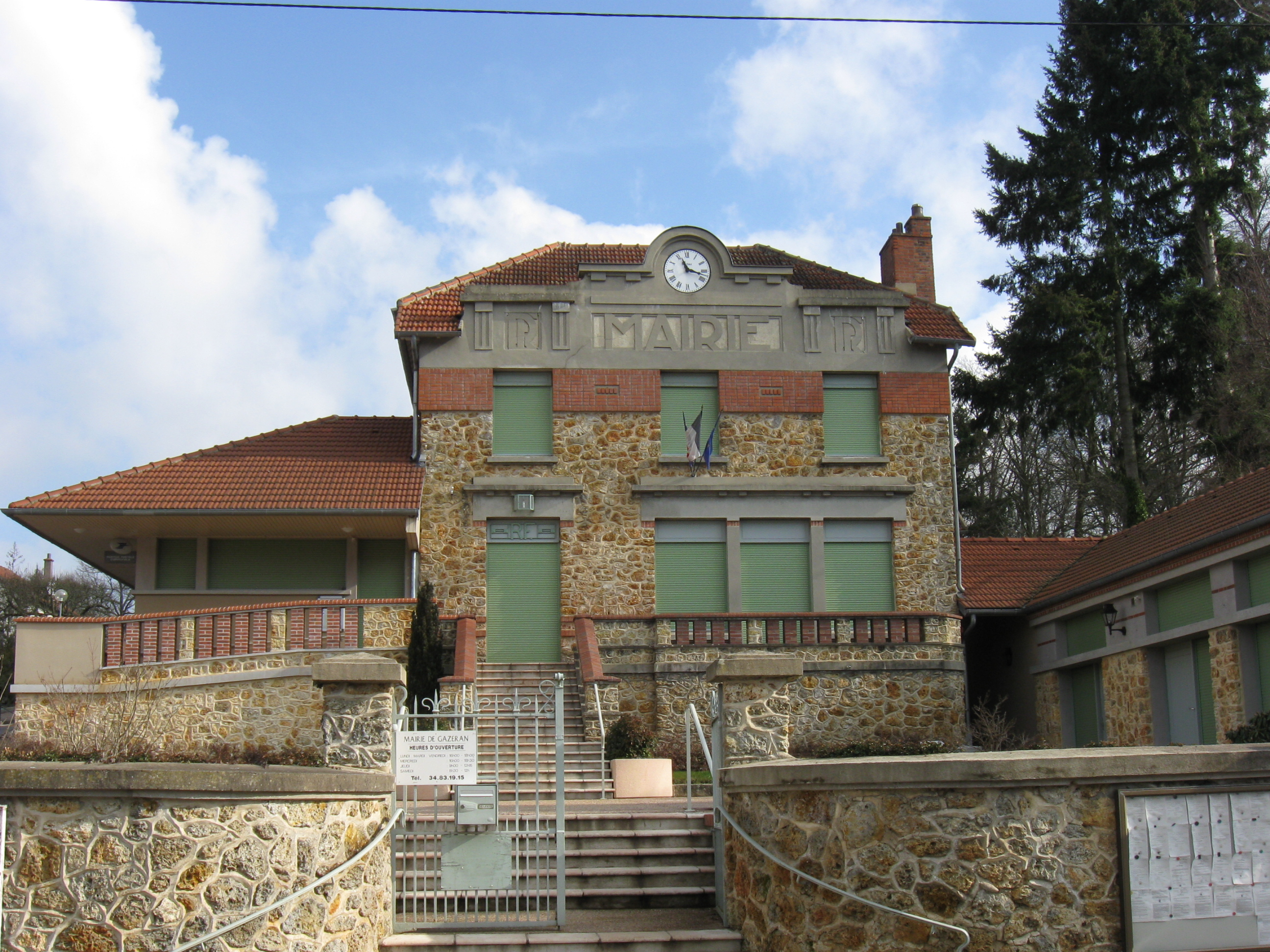
- The town hall in Gazeran

- Coat of arms
- Location of Gazeran
- Location within France Location within Île-de-France (region)
- Coordinates: 48°38′05″N 1°46′28″E
- Country: France
- Region: Île-de-France
- Department: Yvelines
- Arrondissement: Rambouillet
- Canton: Rambouillet
- Intercommunality: CA Rambouillet Territoires

Government
  - Mayor (2020–2026): Emmanuel Salignat
- Area^{1}: 25.80 km^{2} (9.96 sq mi)
- Elevation: 162 m (531 ft)
- Highest elevation: 171 m (561 ft)
- Lowest elevation: 131 m (430 ft)
- Population (2023): 1,492
  - Density: 57.83/km^{2} (149.8/sq mi)
- Time zone: UTC+01:00 (CET)
  - Summer (DST): UTC+02:00 (CEST)
- INSEE/Postal code: 78269 /78125
- ^{1} French Land Register data, which excludes lakes, ponds, glaciers > 1 km^{2} (0.386 sq mi or 247 acres) and river estuaries.

Gazeran (French: [gazʁɑ̃]) is a commune in the Yvelines department in the Île-de-France region in north-central France.

== See also ==
- Communes of the Yvelines department
