= Vieille-Église-en-Yvelines =

- Commune
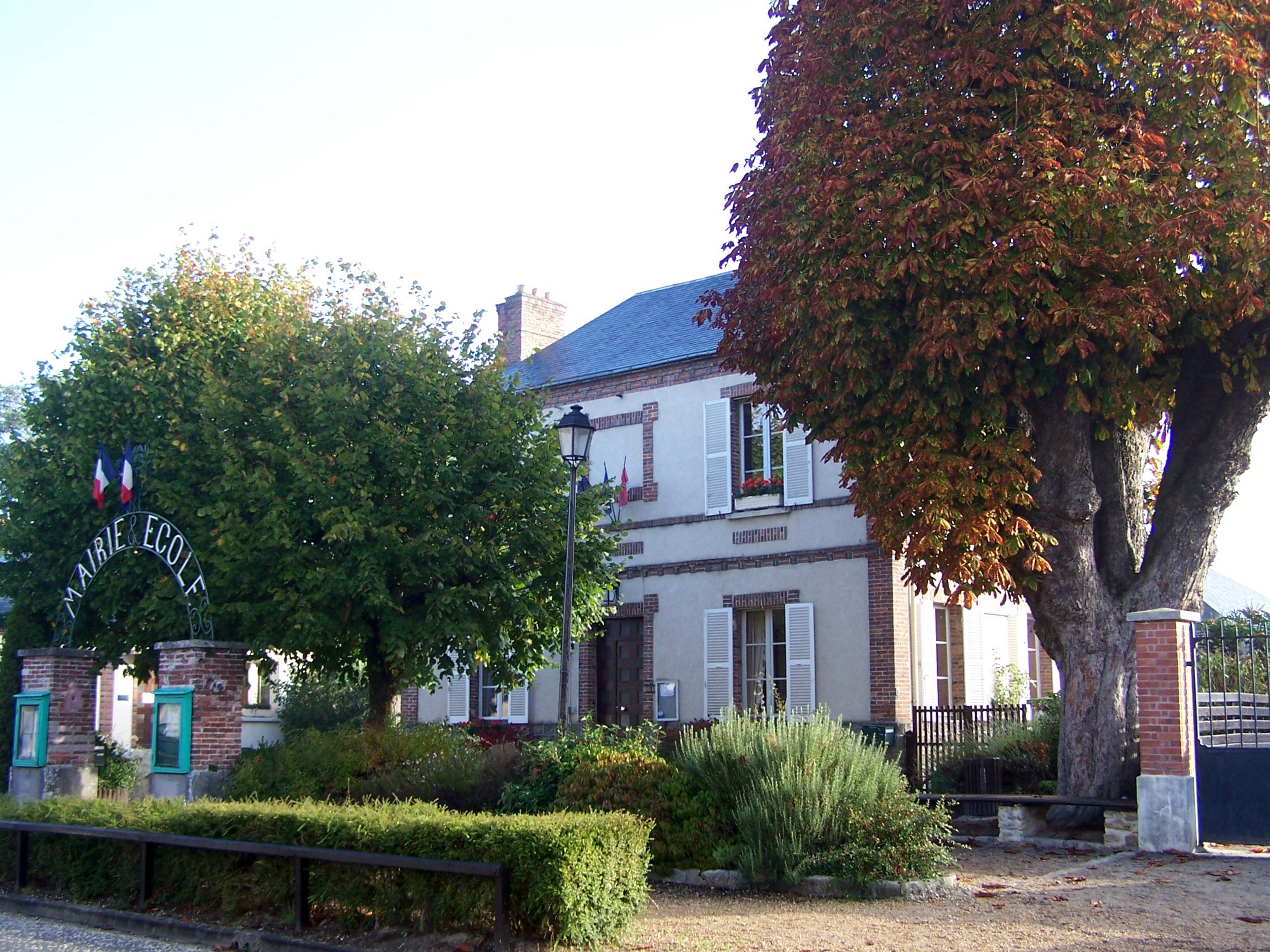
- Town hall

- Coat of arms
- Location of Vieille-Église-en-Yvelines
- Location within France Location within Île-de-France (region)
- Coordinates: 48°40′13″N 1°52′36″E
- Country: France
- Region: Île-de-France
- Department: Yvelines
- Arrondissement: Rambouillet
- Canton: Rambouillet
- Intercommunality: CA Rambouillet Territoires

Government
  - Mayor (2020–2026): Jean-Louis Duchamp
- Area^{1}: 9.60 km^{2} (3.71 sq mi)
- Elevation: 170 m (560 ft)
- Highest elevation: 177 m (581 ft)
- Lowest elevation: 161 m (528 ft)
- Population (2023): 652
  - Density: 67.9/km^{2} (176/sq mi)
- Time zone: UTC+01:00 (CET)
  - Summer (DST): UTC+02:00 (CEST)
- INSEE/Postal code: 78655 /78125
- ^{1} French Land Register data, which excludes lakes, ponds, glaciers > 1 km^{2} (0.386 sq mi or 247 acres) and river estuaries.

Vieille-Église-en-Yvelines (French pronunciation: [vjɛj eɡliz ɑ̃.n‿ivlin]) is a commune in the Yvelines department in the Île-de-France in north-central France.

== See also ==
- Communes of the Yvelines department
