= Prunay-en-Yvelines =

- Commune
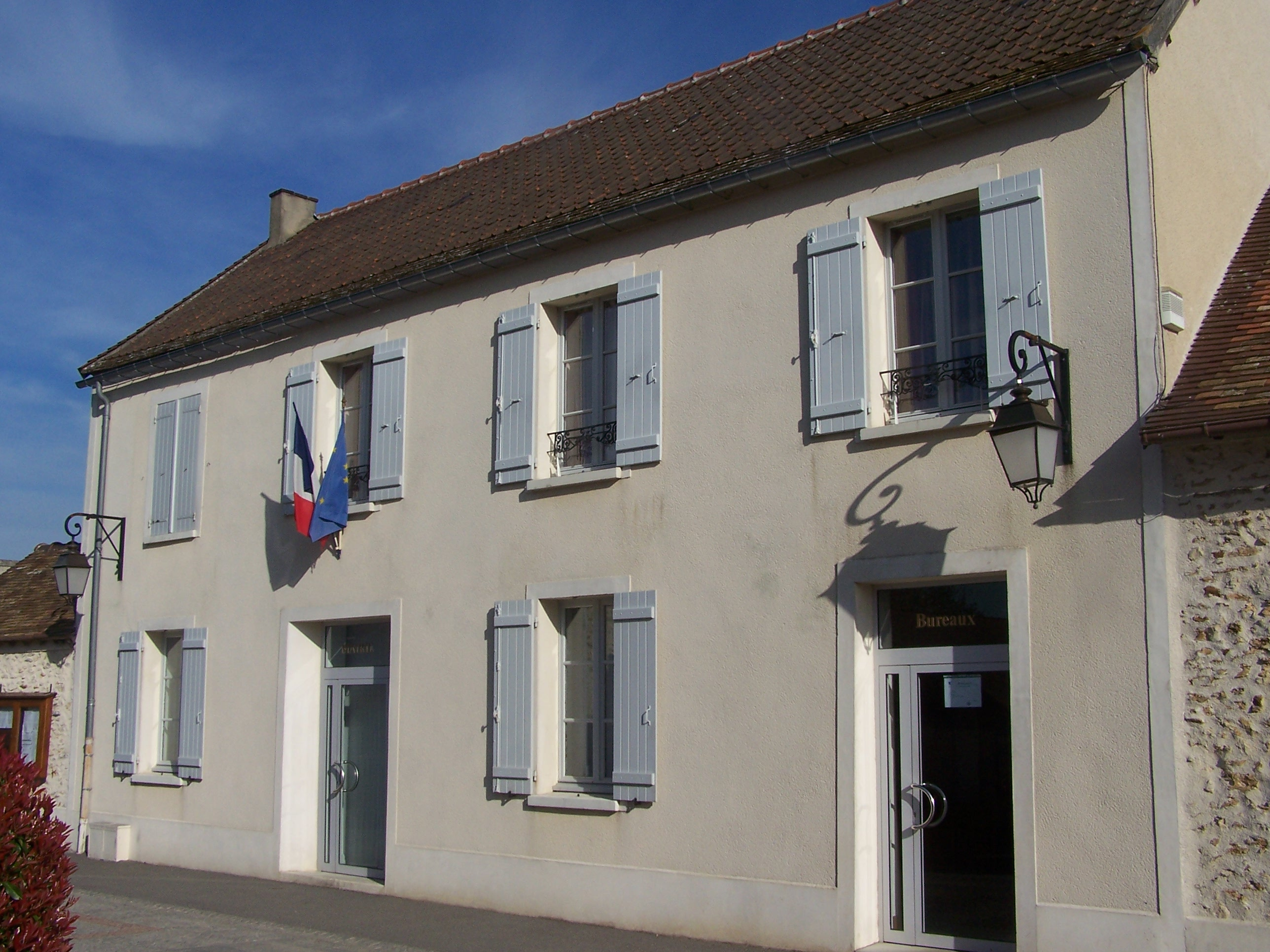
- The town hall in Prunay-en-Yvelines
- Location of Prunay-en-Yvelines
- Location within France Location within Île-de-France (region)
- Coordinates: 48°31′44″N 1°47′46″E
- Country: France
- Region: Île-de-France
- Department: Yvelines
- Arrondissement: Rambouillet
- Canton: Rambouillet
- Intercommunality: CA Rambouillet Territoires

Government
  - Mayor (2020–2026): Jean-Pierre Malardeau
- Area^{1}: 26.95 km^{2} (10.41 sq mi)
- Elevation: 150 m (490 ft)
- Highest elevation: 164 m (538 ft)
- Lowest elevation: 127 m (417 ft)
- Population (2023): 808
  - Density: 30.0/km^{2} (77.7/sq mi)
- Time zone: UTC+01:00 (CET)
  - Summer (DST): UTC+02:00 (CEST)
- INSEE/Postal code: 78506 /78660
- Website: prunay-en-yvelines.fr
- ^{1} French Land Register data, which excludes lakes, ponds, glaciers > 1 km^{2} (0.386 sq mi or 247 acres) and river estuaries.

Prunay-en-Yvelines (French pronunciation: [pʁynɛ ɑ̃n‿ivlin]; lit. 'Prunay-in-Yvelines') is a rural commune in the Yvelines department in the Île-de-France in northern France. It is on the departmental border with Eure-et-Loir, which is also the regional border with Centre-Val de Loire.

== See also ==
- Communes of the Yvelines department
