= Dannemarie, Yvelines =

Dannemarie
- Commune
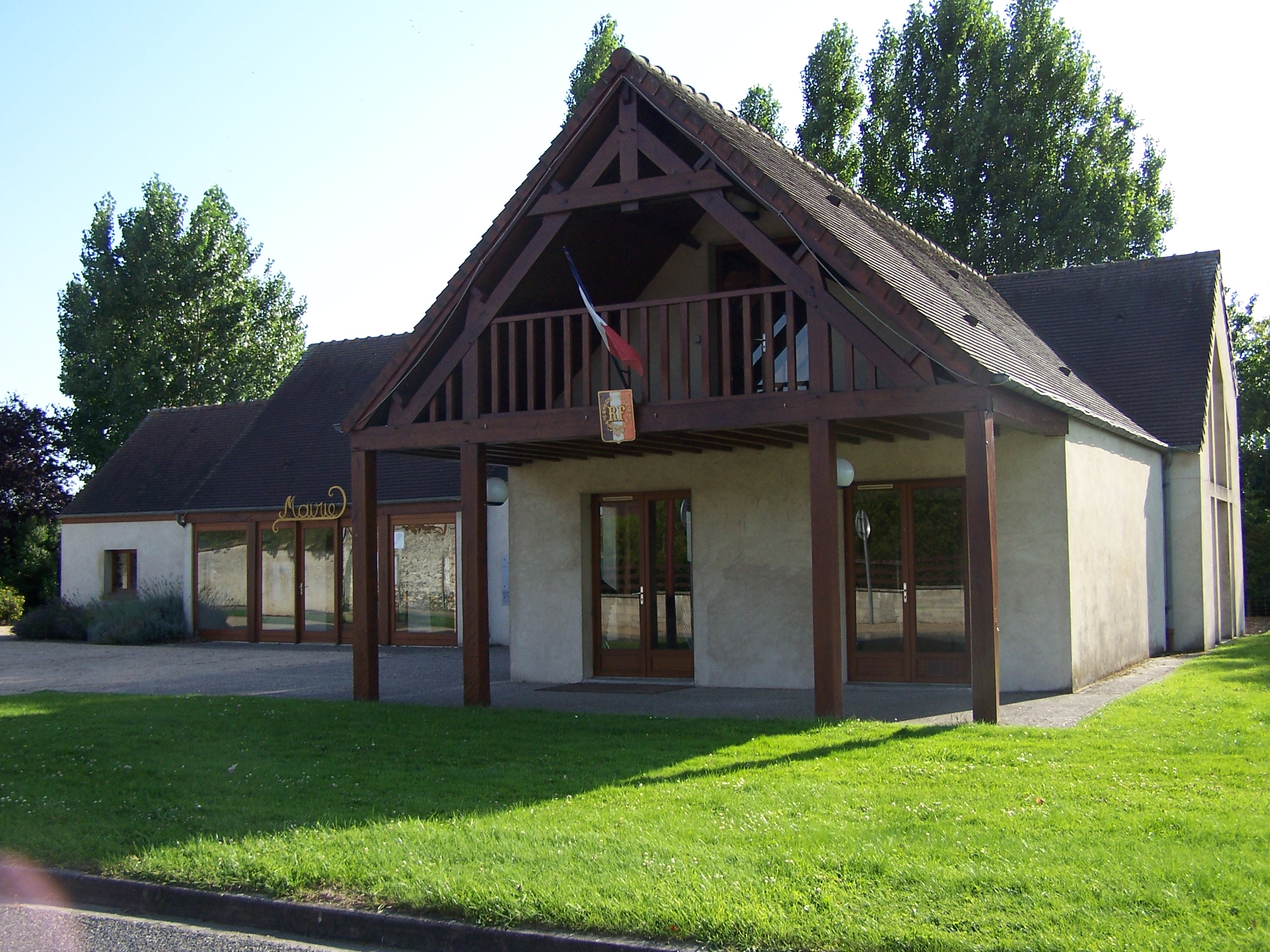
- Town hall
- Location of Dannemarie
- Location within France Location within Île-de-France (region)
- Coordinates: 48°45′45″N 1°36′28″E
- Country: France
- Region: Île-de-France
- Department: Yvelines
- Arrondissement: Mantes-la-Jolie
- Canton: Bonnières-sur-Seine
- Intercommunality: Pays houdanais

Government
  - Mayor (2020–2026): Jean-Pierre Gilard
- Area^{1}: 3.44 km^{2} (1.33 sq mi)
- Elevation: 107 m (351 ft)
- Highest elevation: 134 m (440 ft)
- Lowest elevation: 102 m (335 ft)
- Population (2023): 229
  - Density: 66.6/km^{2} (172/sq mi)
- Time zone: UTC+01:00 (CET)
  - Summer (DST): UTC+02:00 (CEST)
- INSEE/Postal code: 78194 /78550
- ^{1} French Land Register data, which excludes lakes, ponds, glaciers > 1 km^{2} (0.386 sq mi or 247 acres) and river estuaries.

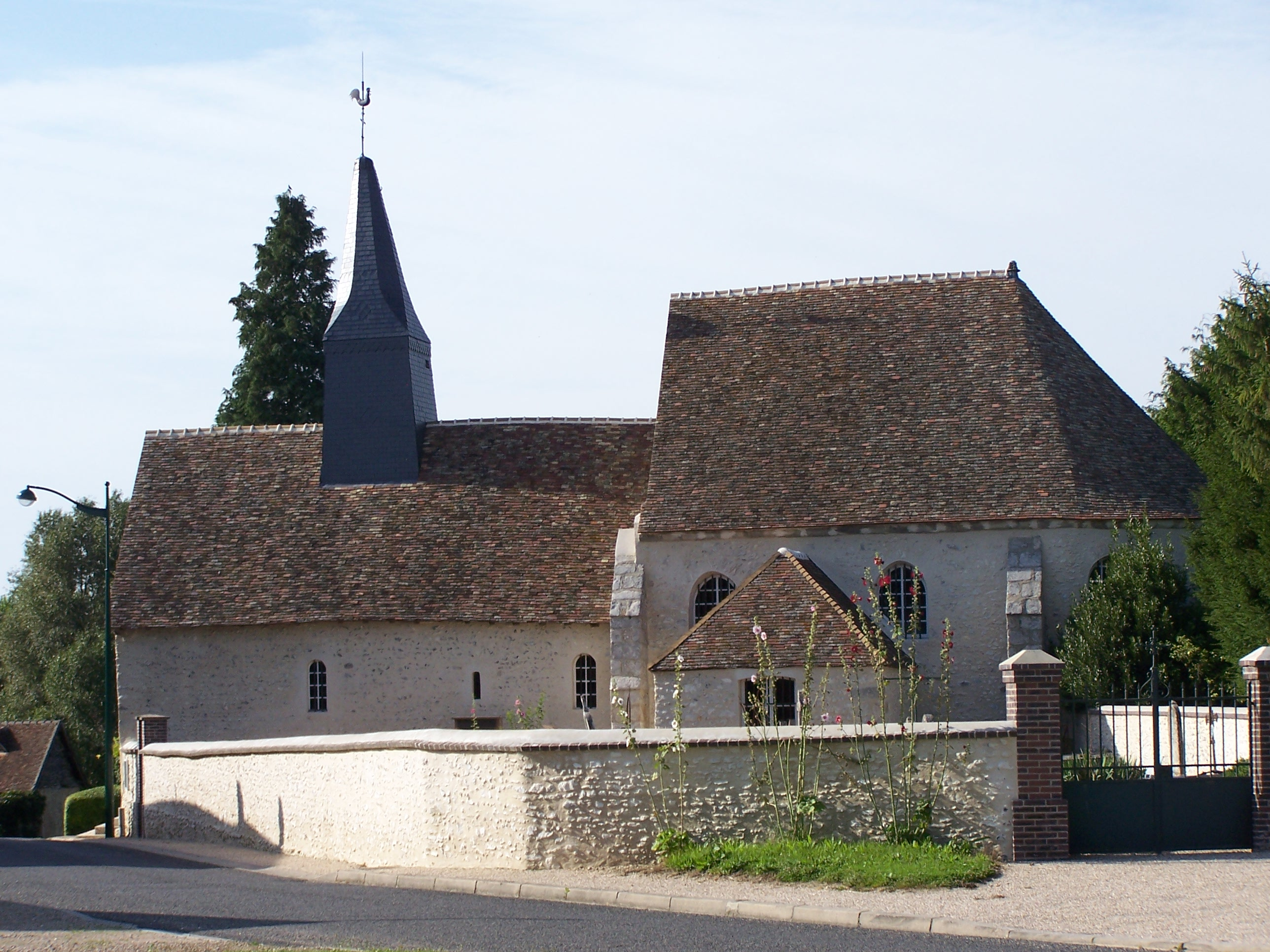
Sainte-Anne

Dannemarie (French pronunciation: [danmaʁi]) is a commune in the Yvelines department in the Île-de-France in north-central France.

== See also ==
- Communes of the Yvelines department
