= Saint-Arnoult-en-Yvelines =

- Commune
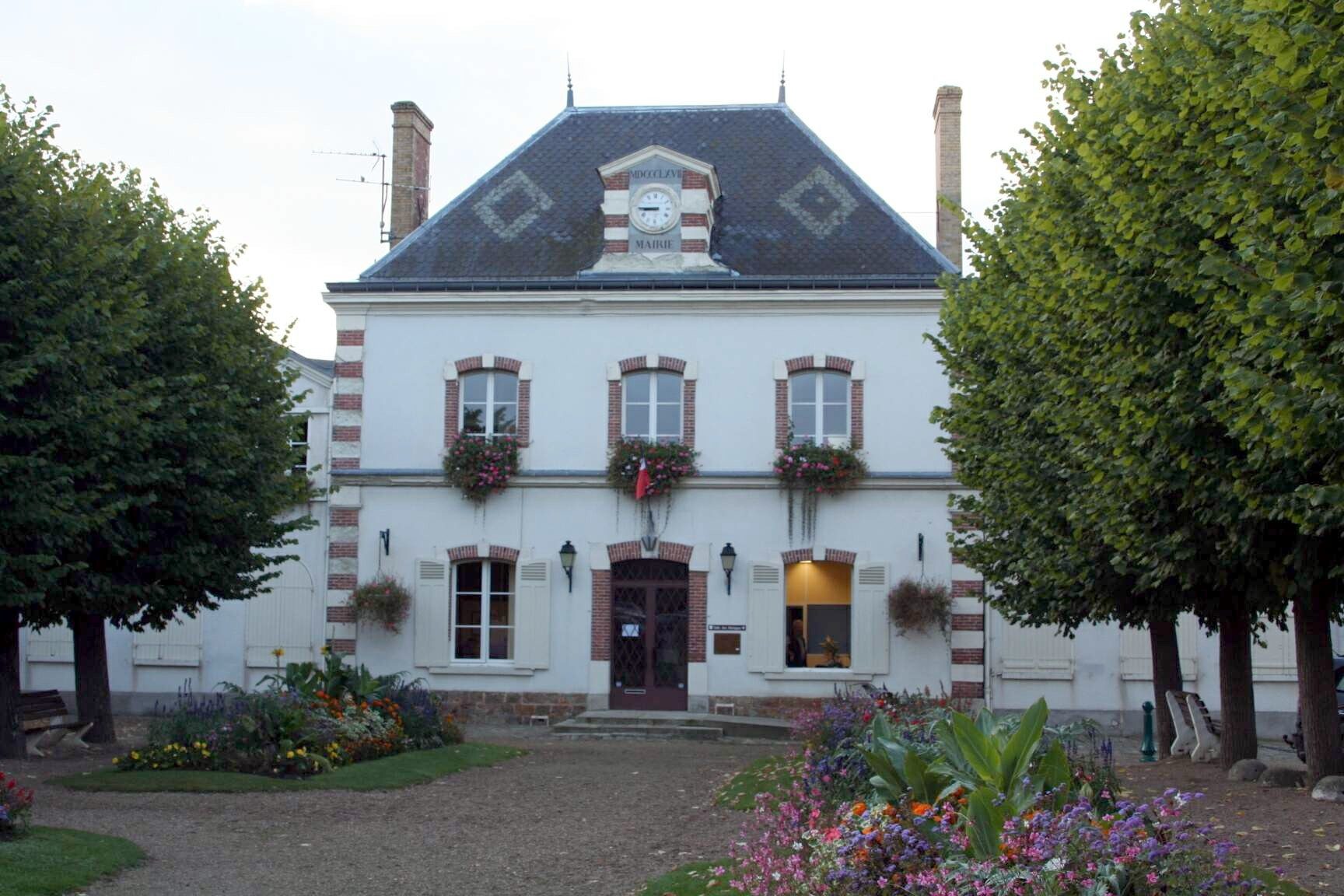
- Town hall
- Location of Saint-Arnoult-en-Yvelines
- Location within France Location within Île-de-France (region)
- Coordinates: 48°34′20″N 1°56′29″E
- Country: France
- Region: Île-de-France
- Department: Yvelines
- Arrondissement: Rambouillet
- Canton: Rambouillet
- Intercommunality: CA Rambouillet Territoires

Government
  - Mayor (2021–2026): Joëlle Jegat
- Area^{1}: 12.55 km^{2} (4.85 sq mi)
- Elevation: 104 m (341 ft)
- Highest elevation: 164 m (538 ft)
- Lowest elevation: 103 m (338 ft)
- Population (2023): 5,875
  - Density: 468.1/km^{2} (1,212/sq mi)
- Time zone: UTC+01:00 (CET)
  - Summer (DST): UTC+02:00 (CEST)
- INSEE/Postal code: 78537 /78730
- ^{1} French Land Register data, which excludes lakes, ponds, glaciers > 1 km^{2} (0.386 sq mi or 247 acres) and river estuaries.

Saint-Arnoult-en-Yvelines (French pronunciation: [sɛ̃t‿aʁnu ɑ̃.n‿ivlin]) is a commune in the Yvelines department in the Île-de-France in north-central France.

== Population ==
Historical population
Year	Pop.	±% p.a.
1968	1,584	—
1975	3,016	+9.64%
1982	4,442	+5.69%
1990	5,811	+3.42%
1999	5,671	−0.27%
2007	5,842	+0.37%
2012	6,128	+0.96%
2017	6,001	−0.42%
2023	5,875	−0.35%
Source: INSEE

== Twin towns ==
- Freudenberg am Main Germany (1993)
- Terras de Bouro Portugal (2004)

== See also ==
- Communes of the Yvelines department
