= Ponthévrard =

- Commune
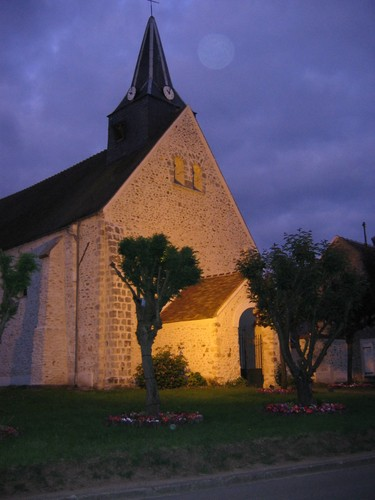
- The church in Ponthevrard

- Coat of arms
- Location of Ponthévrard
- Location within France Location within Île-de-France (region)
- Coordinates: 48°33′08″N 1°54′39″E
- Country: France
- Region: Île-de-France
- Department: Yvelines
- Arrondissement: Rambouillet
- Canton: Rambouillet
- Intercommunality: CA Rambouillet Territoires

Government
  - Mayor (2021–2026): Nathalia Bricaud
- Area^{1}: 2.57 km^{2} (0.99 sq mi)
- Elevation: 160 m (520 ft)
- Highest elevation: 164 m (538 ft)
- Lowest elevation: 141 m (463 ft)
- Population (2023): 693
  - Density: 270/km^{2} (698/sq mi)
- Time zone: UTC+01:00 (CET)
  - Summer (DST): UTC+02:00 (CEST)
- INSEE/Postal code: 78499 /78730
- ^{1} French Land Register data, which excludes lakes, ponds, glaciers > 1 km^{2} (0.386 sq mi or 247 acres) and river estuaries.

Ponthévrard (French pronunciation: [pɔ̃tevʁaʁ]) is a commune in the Yvelines department in the Île-de-France in north-central France.

== See also ==
- Communes of the Yvelines department
