= Clairefontaine-en-Yvelines =

- Commune
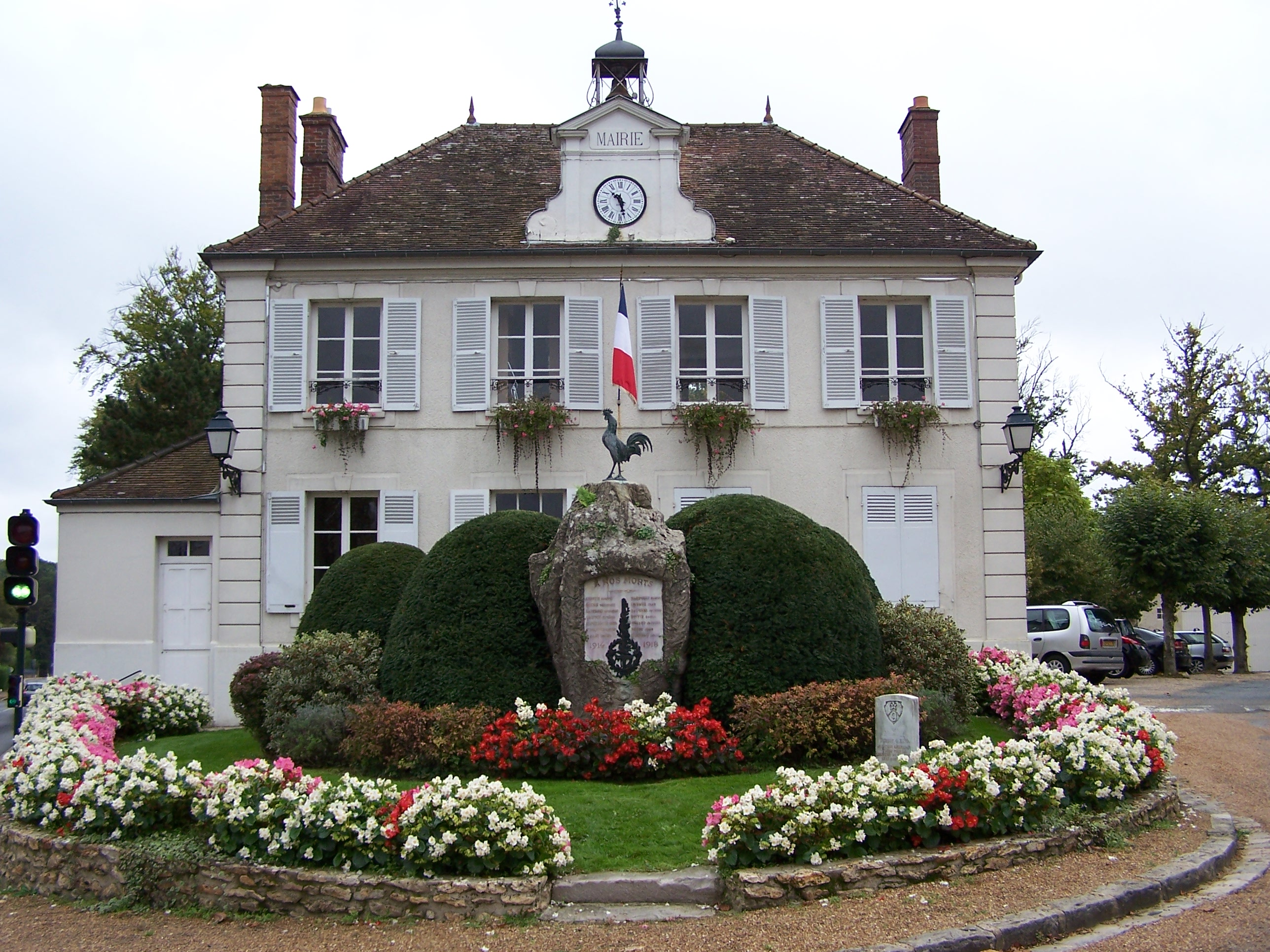
- Clairefontaine-en-Yvelines Town Hall

- Coat of arms
- Location of Clairefontaine-en-Yvelines
- Location within France Location within Île-de-France (region)
- Coordinates: 48°36′47″N 1°54′31″E
- Country: France
- Region: Île-de-France
- Department: Yvelines
- Arrondissement: Rambouillet
- Canton: Rambouillet
- Intercommunality: CA Rambouillet Territoires

Government
  - Mayor (2020–2026): Jacques Troger
- Area^{1}: 17.22 km^{2} (6.65 sq mi)
- Elevation: 128 m (420 ft)
- Highest elevation: 175 m (574 ft)
- Lowest elevation: 119 m (390 ft)
- Population (2023): 850
  - Density: 49/km^{2} (130/sq mi)
- Time zone: UTC+01:00 (CET)
  - Summer (DST): UTC+02:00 (CEST)
- INSEE/Postal code: 78164 /78120
- ^{1} French Land Register data, which excludes lakes, ponds, glaciers > 1 km^{2} (0.386 sq mi or 247 acres) and river estuaries.

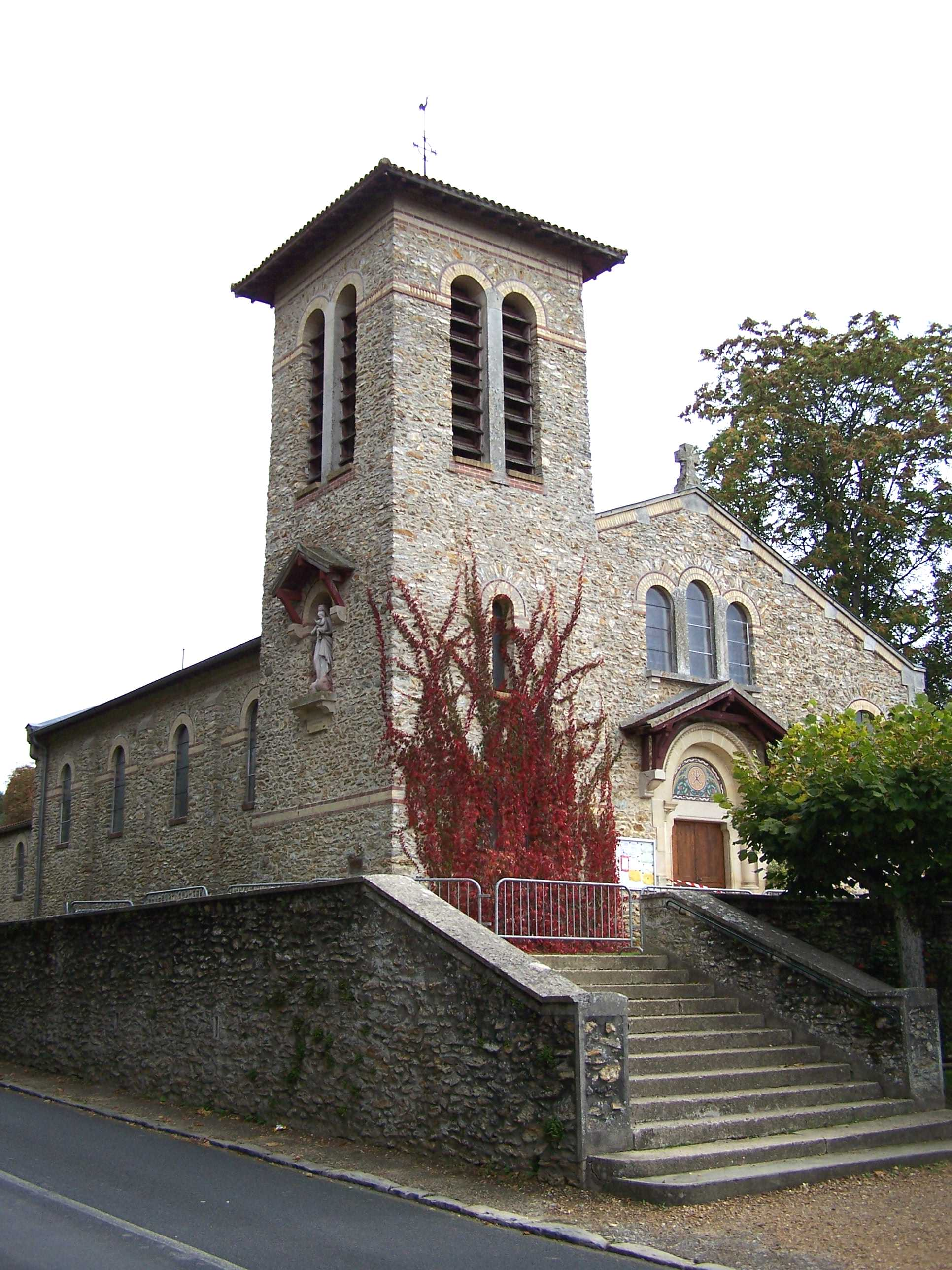
Saint-Nicolas

Clairefontaine-en-Yvelines (French pronunciation: [klɛʁfɔ̃tɛn ɑ̃.n‿ivlin]) is a commune in the Yvelines department in the Île-de-France region in north-central France.

It is the base of the Clairefontaine French National football academy.

== See also ==
- Communes of the Yvelines department
- Listing of the works of Alexandre Falguière
