= Mareil-le-Guyon =

- Commune
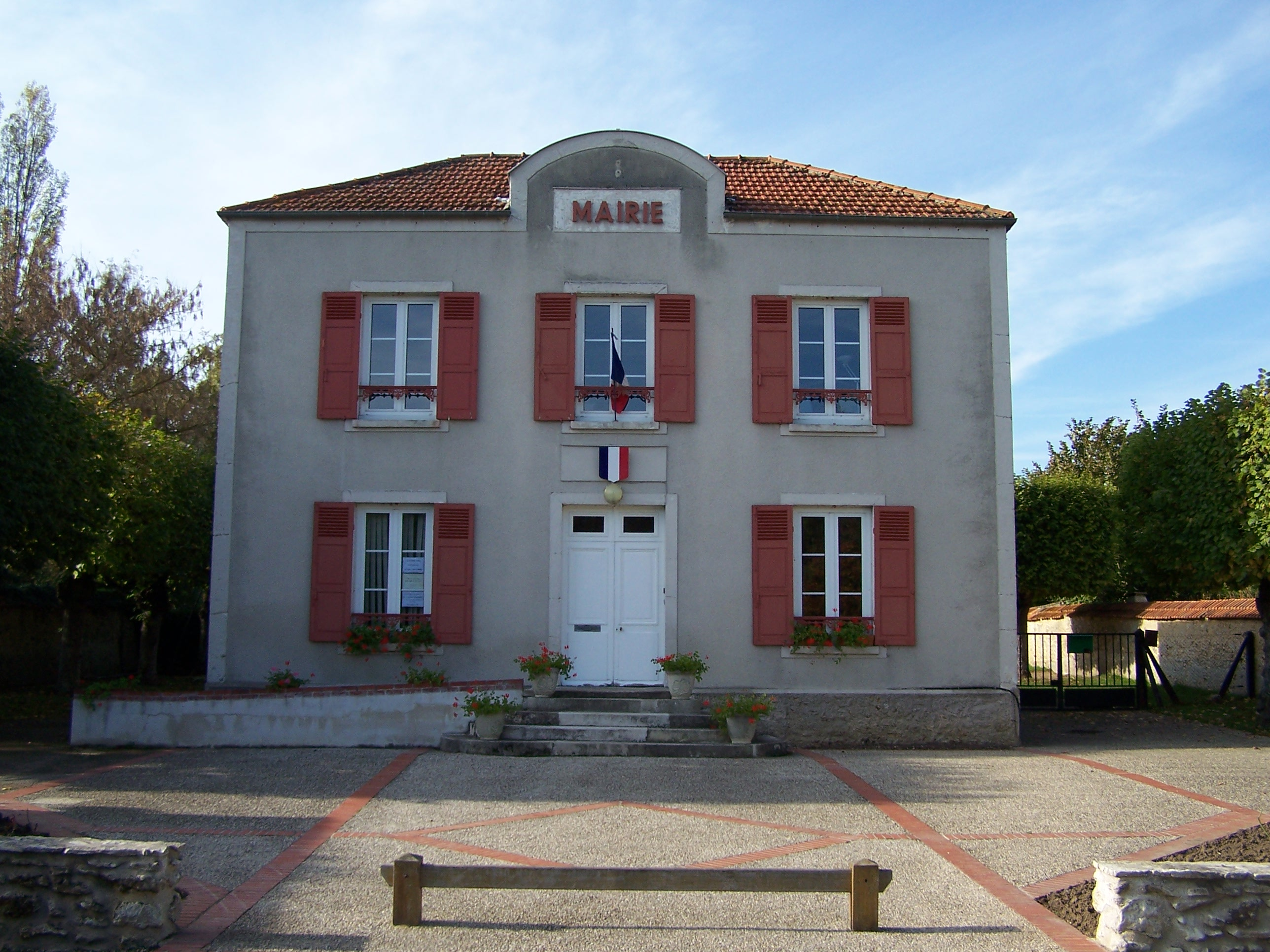
- Town hall

- Coat of arms
- Location of Mareil-le-Guyon
- Location within France Location within Île-de-France (region)
- Coordinates: 48°47′28″N 1°51′13″E
- Country: France
- Region: Île-de-France
- Department: Yvelines
- Arrondissement: Rambouillet
- Canton: Aubergenville

Government
  - Mayor (2020–2026): Michel Lommis
- Area^{1}: 4.00 km^{2} (1.54 sq mi)
- Elevation: 73 m (240 ft)
- Highest elevation: 112 m (367 ft)
- Lowest elevation: 67 m (220 ft)
- Population (2023): 420
  - Density: 110/km^{2} (270/sq mi)
- Time zone: UTC+01:00 (CET)
  - Summer (DST): UTC+02:00 (CEST)
- INSEE/Postal code: 78366 /78490
- ^{1} French Land Register data, which excludes lakes, ponds, glaciers > 1 km^{2} (0.386 sq mi or 247 acres) and river estuaries.

Mareil-le-Guyon (French pronunciation: [maʁɛj lə ɡɥijɔ̃]) is a commune in the Yvelines department in the Île-de-France region in north-central France.

== See also ==
- Communes of the Yvelines department
