= Autouillet =

- Commune
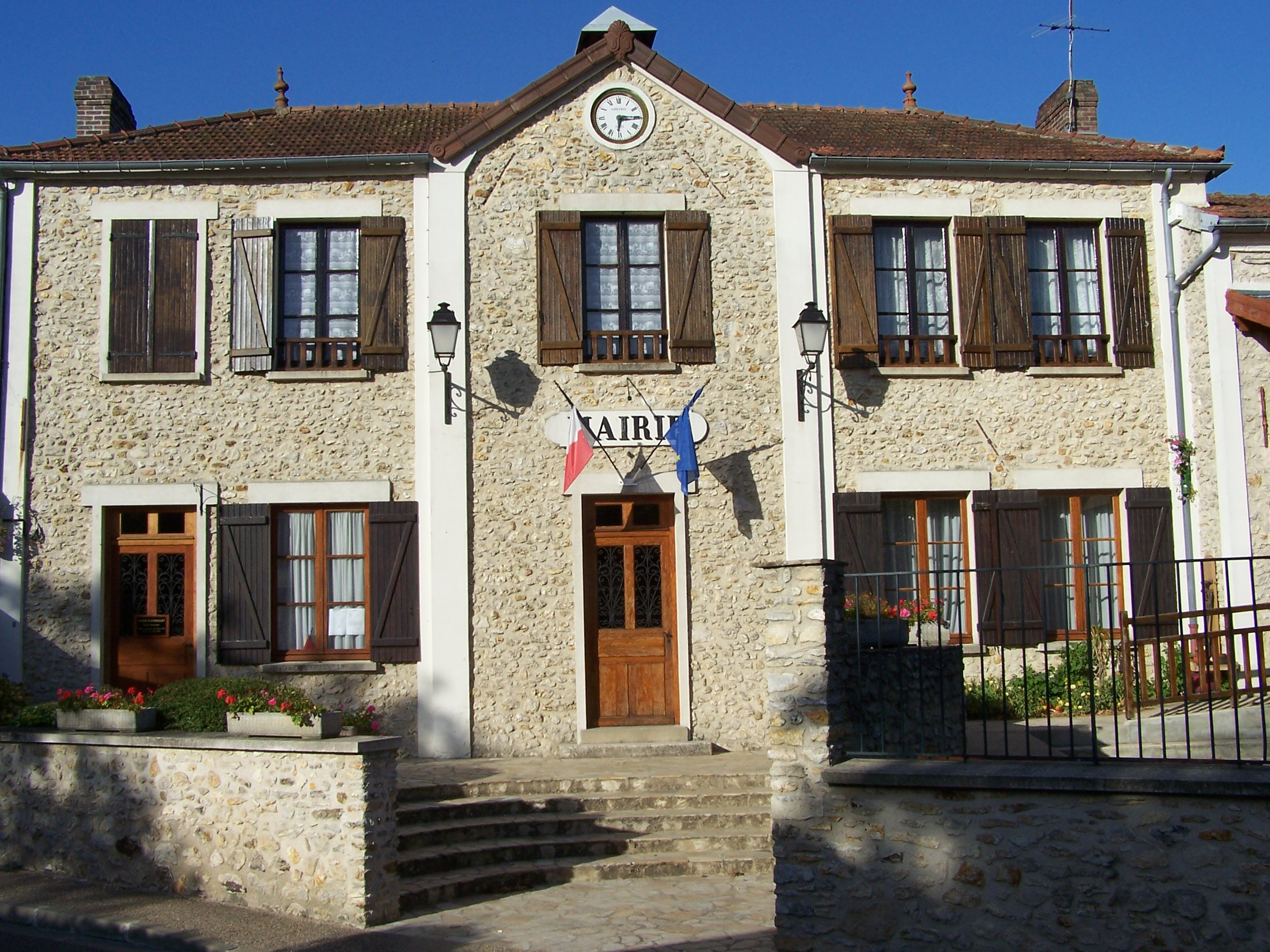
- The town hall in Autouillet

- Coat of arms
- Location of Autouillet
- Location within France Location within Île-de-France (region)
- Coordinates: 48°51′01″N 1°48′17″E
- Country: France
- Region: Île-de-France
- Department: Yvelines
- Arrondissement: Rambouillet
- Canton: Aubergenville
- Intercommunality: CC Cœur d'Yvelines

Government
  - Mayor (2020–2026): Françoise Lénard
- Area^{1}: 4.94 km^{2} (1.91 sq mi)
- Elevation: 110 m (360 ft)
- Highest elevation: 171 m (561 ft)
- Lowest elevation: 88 m (289 ft)
- Population (2023): 665
  - Density: 135/km^{2} (349/sq mi)
- Time zone: UTC+01:00 (CET)
  - Summer (DST): UTC+02:00 (CEST)
- INSEE/Postal code: 78036 /78770
- ^{1} French Land Register data, which excludes lakes, ponds, glaciers > 1 km^{2} (0.386 sq mi or 247 acres) and river estuaries.

Autouillet (French pronunciation: [otujɛ]) is a commune in the Yvelines department in north-central France.

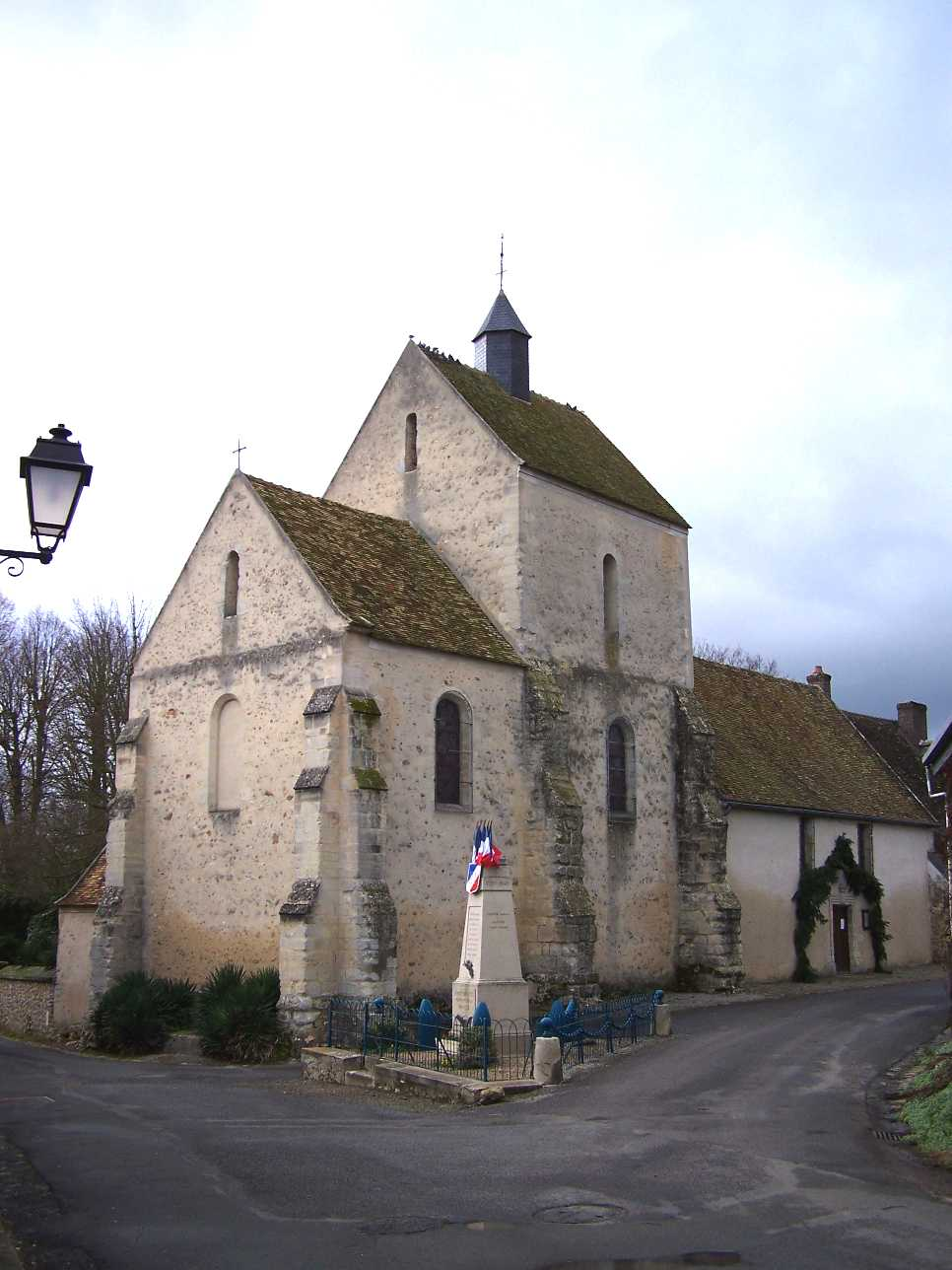
The church

== Population ==
Historical population
Year	Pop.	±% p.a.
1968	149	—
1975	189	+3.46%
1982	270	+5.23%
1990	251	−0.91%
1999	348	+3.70%
2007	461	+3.58%
2012	476	+0.64%
2017	509	+1.35%
2023	665	+4.56%
Source: INSEE

== See also ==
- Communes of the Yvelines department
