= Senlisse =

- Commune
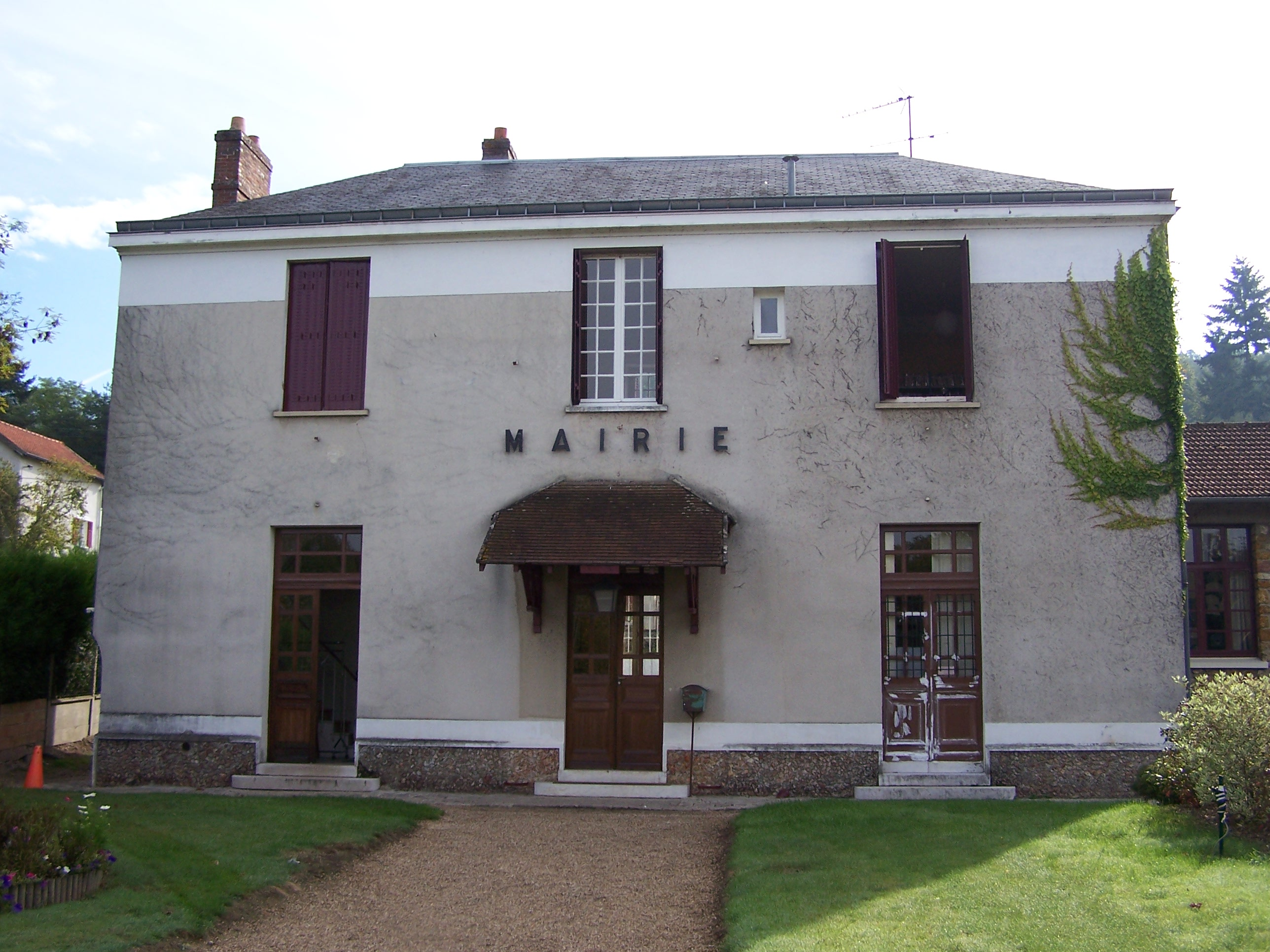
- Town hall
- Location of Senlisse
- Location within France Location within Île-de-France (region)
- Coordinates: 48°41′16″N 1°58′57″E
- Country: France
- Region: Île-de-France
- Department: Yvelines
- Arrondissement: Rambouillet
- Canton: Maurepas

Government
  - Mayor (2020–2026): Claude Benmussa
- Area^{1}: 7.9 km^{2} (3.1 sq mi)
- Elevation: 96 m (315 ft)
- Highest elevation: 179 m (587 ft)
- Lowest elevation: 88 m (289 ft)
- Population (2023): 511
  - Density: 65/km^{2} (170/sq mi)
- Time zone: UTC+01:00 (CET)
  - Summer (DST): UTC+02:00 (CEST)
- INSEE/Postal code: 78590 /78720
- ^{1} French Land Register data, which excludes lakes, ponds, glaciers > 1 km^{2} (0.386 sq mi or 247 acres) and river estuaries.

Senlisse (French pronunciation: [sɑ̃lis]) is a commune in the Yvelines department in the Île-de-France in north-central France.

== See also ==
- Communes of the Yvelines department
