= Marcq, Yvelines =

Marcq
- Commune
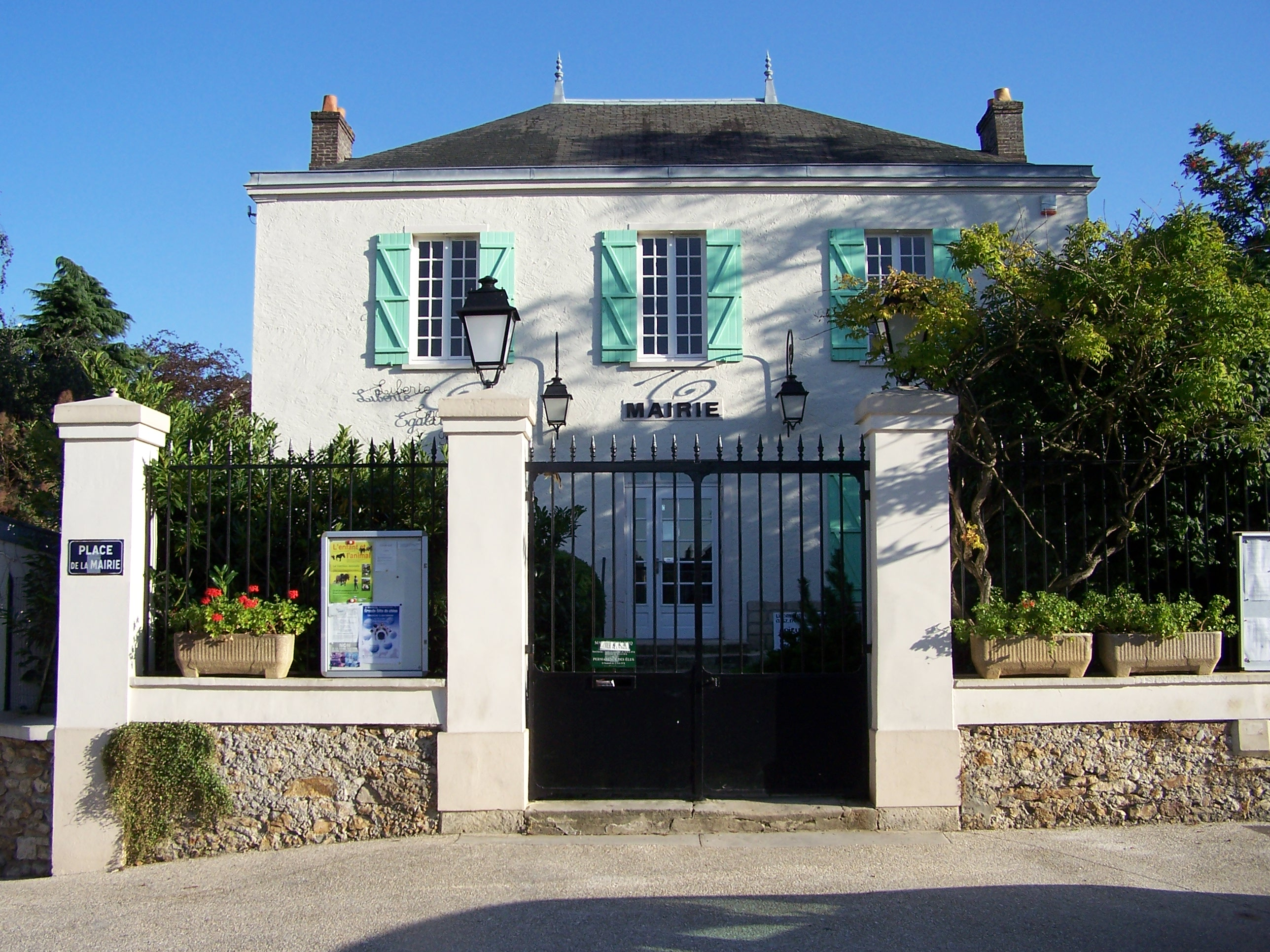
- Town hall
- Location of Marcq
- Location within France Location within Île-de-France (region)
- Coordinates: 48°51′37″N 1°49′11″E
- Country: France
- Region: Île-de-France
- Department: Yvelines
- Arrondissement: Rambouillet
- Canton: Aubergenville

Government
  - Mayor (2022–2026): Magali Mejean-Giron
- Area^{1}: 4.72 km^{2} (1.82 sq mi)
- Highest elevation: 172 m (564 ft)
- Lowest elevation: 117 m (384 ft)
- Population (2023): 802
  - Density: 170/km^{2} (440/sq mi)
- Time zone: UTC+01:00 (CET)
  - Summer (DST): UTC+02:00 (CEST)
- INSEE/Postal code: 78364 /78770
- ^{1} French Land Register data, which excludes lakes, ponds, glaciers > 1 km^{2} (0.386 sq mi or 247 acres) and river estuaries.

Marcq (French pronunciation: [maʁk]) is a commune in the Yvelines department in the Île-de-France region in north-central France.

== See also ==
- Communes of the Yvelines department
