= Orcemont =

- Commune
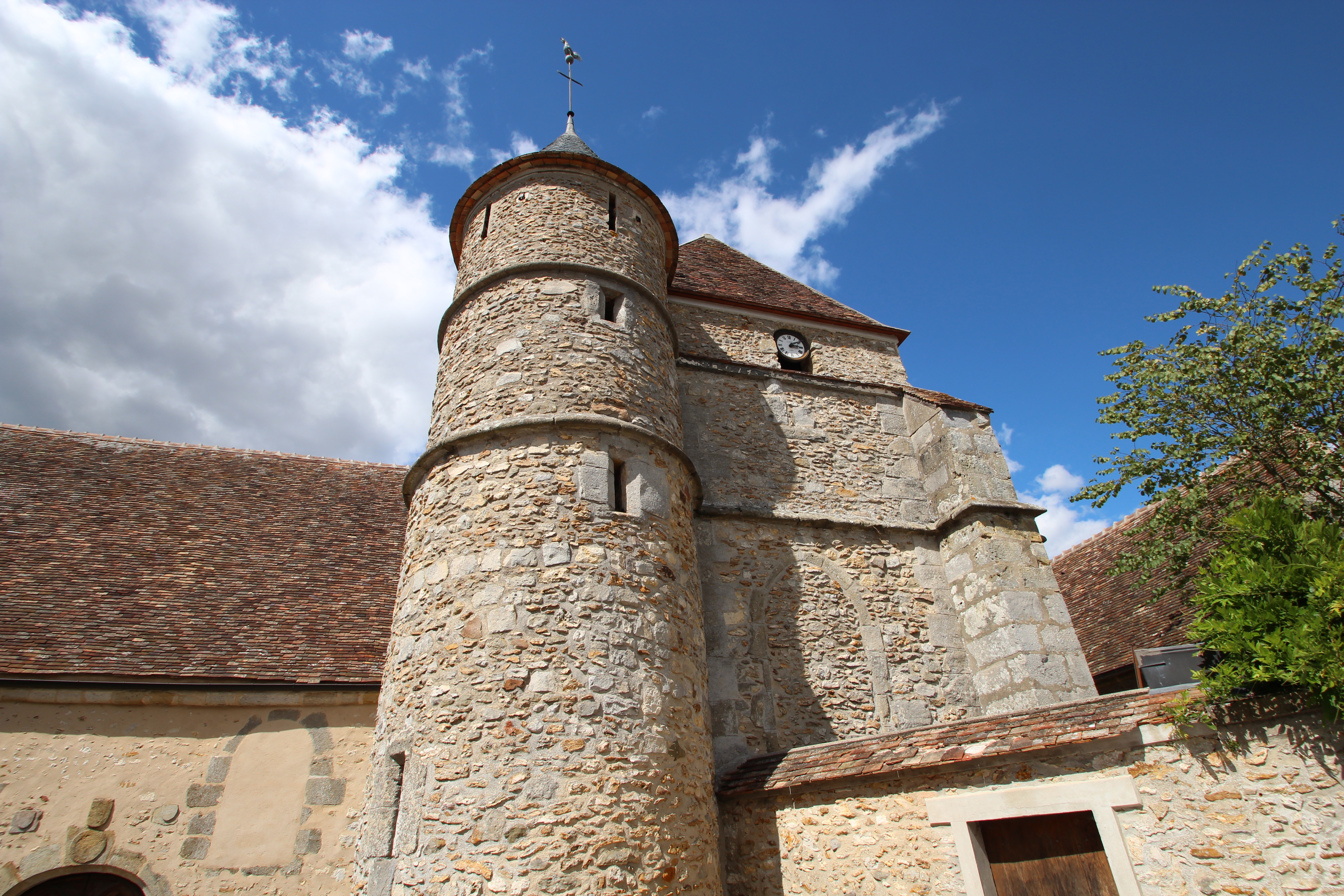
- The church of Saint-Eutrope, in Orcemont
- Location of Orcemont
- Location within France Location within Île-de-France (region)
- Coordinates: 48°35′19″N 1°48′41″E
- Country: France
- Region: Île-de-France
- Department: Yvelines
- Arrondissement: Rambouillet
- Canton: Rambouillet
- Intercommunality: CA Rambouillet Territoires

Government
  - Mayor (2020–2026): Guy Lecourt
- Area^{1}: 10.49 km^{2} (4.05 sq mi)
- Highest elevation: 169 m (554 ft)
- Lowest elevation: 142 m (466 ft)
- Population (2023): 985
  - Density: 93.9/km^{2} (243/sq mi)
- Time zone: UTC+01:00 (CET)
  - Summer (DST): UTC+02:00 (CEST)
- INSEE/Postal code: 78464 /78125
- ^{1} French Land Register data, which excludes lakes, ponds, glaciers > 1 km^{2} (0.386 sq mi or 247 acres) and river estuaries.

Orcemont (French pronunciation: [ɔʁsəmɔ̃]) is a commune in the Yvelines department in the Île-de-France region in north-central France.

== See also ==
- Communes of the Yvelines department
