= Hermeray =

- Commune
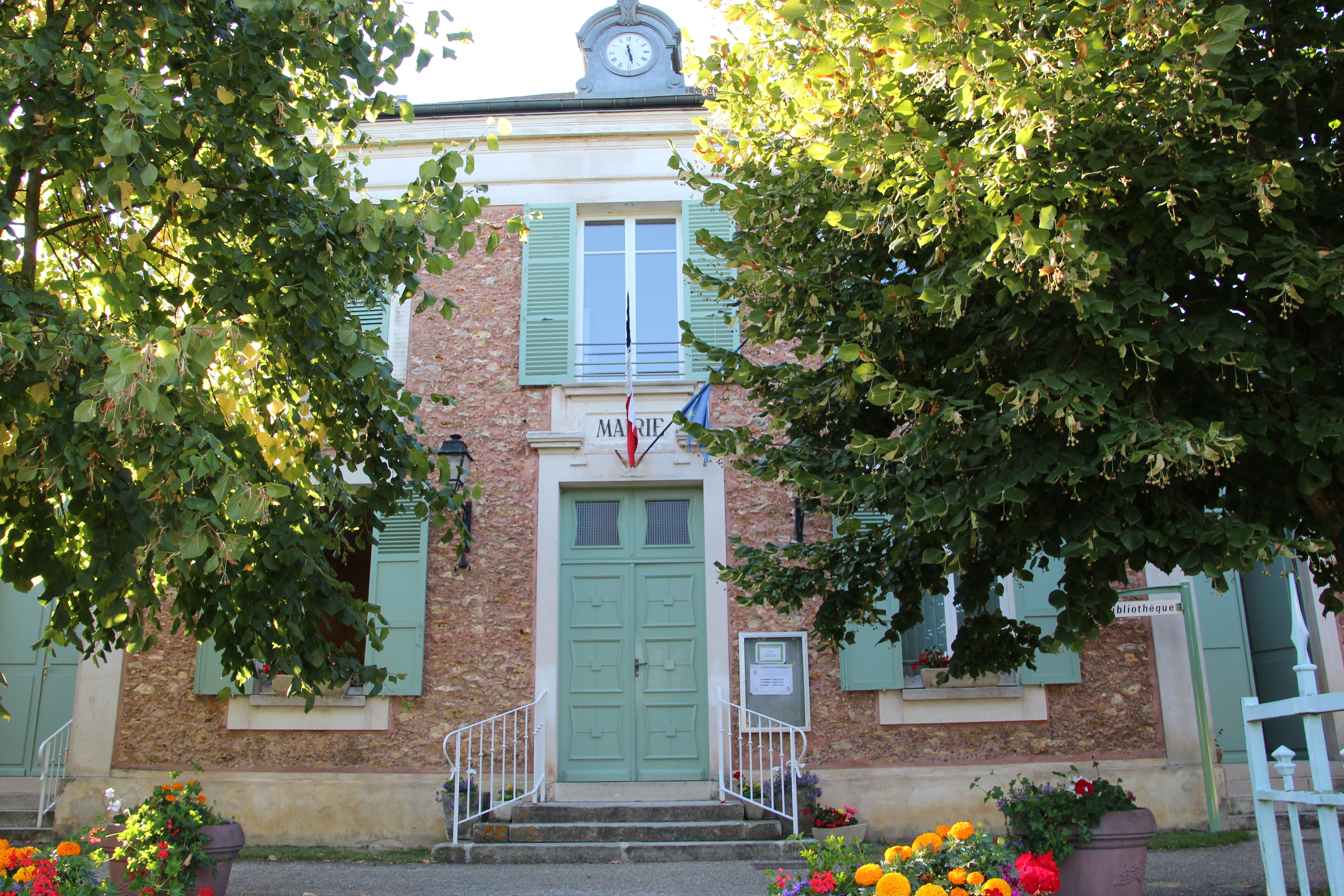
- The town hall in Hermeray

- Coat of arms
- Location of Hermeray
- Location within France Location within Île-de-France (region)
- Coordinates: 48°39′02″N 1°41′20″E
- Country: France
- Region: Île-de-France
- Department: Yvelines
- Arrondissement: Rambouillet
- Canton: Rambouillet
- Intercommunality: CA Rambouillet Territoires

Government
  - Mayor (2020–2026): Evelyne Marchal
- Area^{1}: 18.07 km^{2} (6.98 sq mi)
- Elevation: 134 m (440 ft)
- Highest elevation: 174 m (571 ft)
- Lowest elevation: 119 m (390 ft)
- Population (2023): 1,007
  - Density: 55.73/km^{2} (144.3/sq mi)
- Time zone: UTC+01:00 (CET)
  - Summer (DST): UTC+02:00 (CEST)
- INSEE/Postal code: 78307 /78125
- ^{1} French Land Register data, which excludes lakes, ponds, glaciers > 1 km^{2} (0.386 sq mi or 247 acres) and river estuaries.

Hermeray (French: [ɛʁməʁɛ]) is a commune in the Yvelines département in the Île-de-France region in north-central France.

== See also ==
- Communes of the Yvelines department
