= Canton of Rambouillet =

Coordinates: 48.64°N 1.83°E

The canton of Rambouillet is an administrative division of the Yvelines department, northern France. Its borders were modified at the French canton reorganisation which came into effect in March 2015. Its seat is in Rambouillet.

It consists of the following communes:

1. Ablis
2. Allainville
3. Auffargis
4. Boinville-le-Gaillard
5. La Boissière-École
6. Bonnelles
7. Les Bréviaires
8. Bullion
9. La Celle-les-Bordes
10. Cernay-la-Ville
11. Clairefontaine-en-Yvelines
12. Émancé
13. Les Essarts-le-Roi
14. Gambaiseuil
15. Gazeran
16. Hermeray
17. Longvilliers
18. Mittainville
19. Orcemont
20. Orphin
21. Orsonville
22. Paray-Douaville
23. Le Perray-en-Yvelines
24. Poigny-la-Forêt
25. Ponthévrard
26. Prunay-en-Yvelines
27. Raizeux
28. Rambouillet
29. Rochefort-en-Yvelines
30. Saint-Arnoult-en-Yvelines
31. Sainte-Mesme
32. Saint-Hilarion
33. Saint-Léger-en-Yvelines
34. Saint-Martin-de-Bréthencourt
35. Sonchamp
36. Vieille-Église-en-Yvelines
