= Communauté d'agglomération Rambouillet Territoires =

Rambouillet Territoires
- Communauté d'agglomération
- Interactive map of Rambouillet Territoires
- Coordinates: 48°40′N 01°50′E
- Country: France
- Region: Île-de-France
- Department: Yvelines
- No. of communes: {{{nbcomm}}}
- Established: 2017
- Area: 629.5 km^{2} (243.1 sq mi)
- Population (2019): 79,127
  - Density: 125.7/km^{2} (325.6/sq mi)
- Website: www.rt78.fr

Communauté d'agglomération Rambouillet Territoires is the communauté d'agglomération, an intercommunal structure, centred on the city of Rambouillet. It is located in the Yvelines department, in the Île-de-France region, northern France. Created in 2017, its seat is in Rambouillet. Its area is 629.5 km^{2}. Its population was 79,127 in 2019, of which 27,141 in Rambouillet proper.

== Composition ==
The communauté d'agglomération consists of the following 36 communes:

1. Ablis
2. Allainville
3. Auffargis
4. Boinville-le-Gaillard
5. La Boissière-École
6. Bonnelles
7. Les Bréviaires
8. Bullion
9. La Celle-les-Bordes
10. Cernay-la-Ville
11. Clairefontaine-en-Yvelines
12. Émancé
13. Les Essarts-le-Roi
14. Gambaiseuil
15. Gazeran
16. Hermeray
17. Longvilliers
18. Mittainville
19. Orcemont
20. Orphin
21. Orsonville
22. Paray-Douaville
23. Le Perray-en-Yvelines
24. Poigny-la-Forêt
25. Ponthévrard
26. Prunay-en-Yvelines
27. Raizeux
28. Rambouillet
29. Rochefort-en-Yvelines
30. Saint-Arnoult-en-Yvelines
31. Sainte-Mesme
32. Saint-Hilarion
33. Saint-Léger-en-Yvelines
34. Saint-Martin-de-Bréthencourt
35. Sonchamp
36. Vieille-Église-en-Yvelines
