= Marie Louveau-Rouveyre =

French artist and engraver (1851–1921)

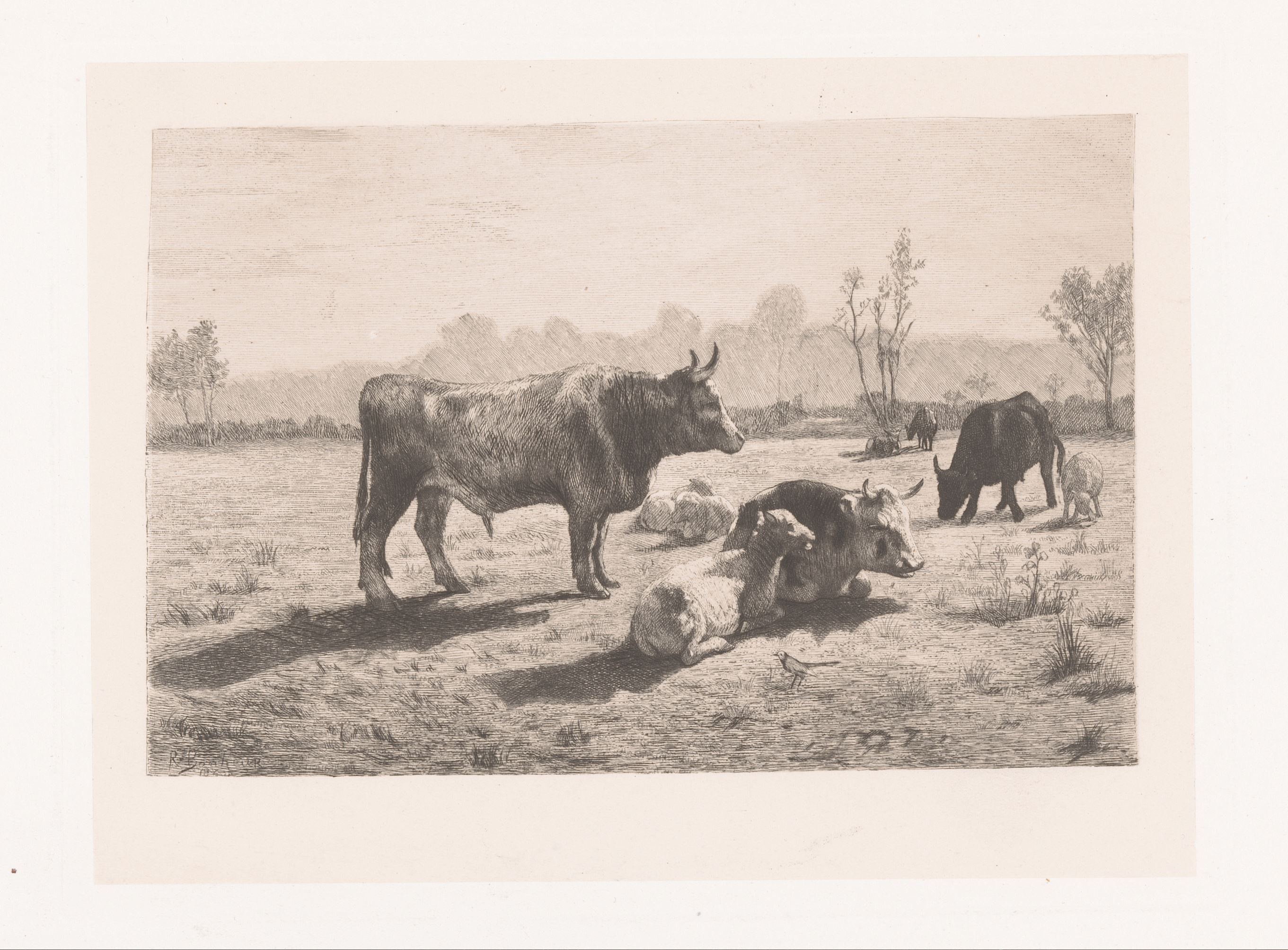
An etching by Marie Louveau-Rouveyre, based on a design by Jacob Salomonsz van Ruysdael

Marie Louveau-Rouveyre (October 6, 1851 – August 23, 1921), also known as Marle-Henriette-Joséphine Louveau, was a French artist and engraver. She was a member of the Paris Salon. Her work was exhibited at the World's Columbian Exposition in Chicago in 1893.

== Early life ==
Marle-Henriette-Joséphine Louveau was born in Paris in 1851. She was trained as an artist by Carolus-Duran, Auguste Laguillermie, and Léopold Flameng.

== Career ==
Louveau-Rouveyre came to specialize in engraving. Her engravings included illustrations for works of literature, including some by Victor Hugo.

Between 1873 and 1905, she regularly exhibited her work at the Paris Salon. In 1876, she presented six etchings inspired by ancient subjects, produced for the Gazette archéologique. Louveau-Rouveyre became a member of the Salon, and in 1888 she won a third-place medal for her work as an etcher.

Beyond France, Louveau-Rouveyre exhibited her work at the Woman's Building of the World's Columbian Exposition in Chicago in 1893.

== Personal life ==
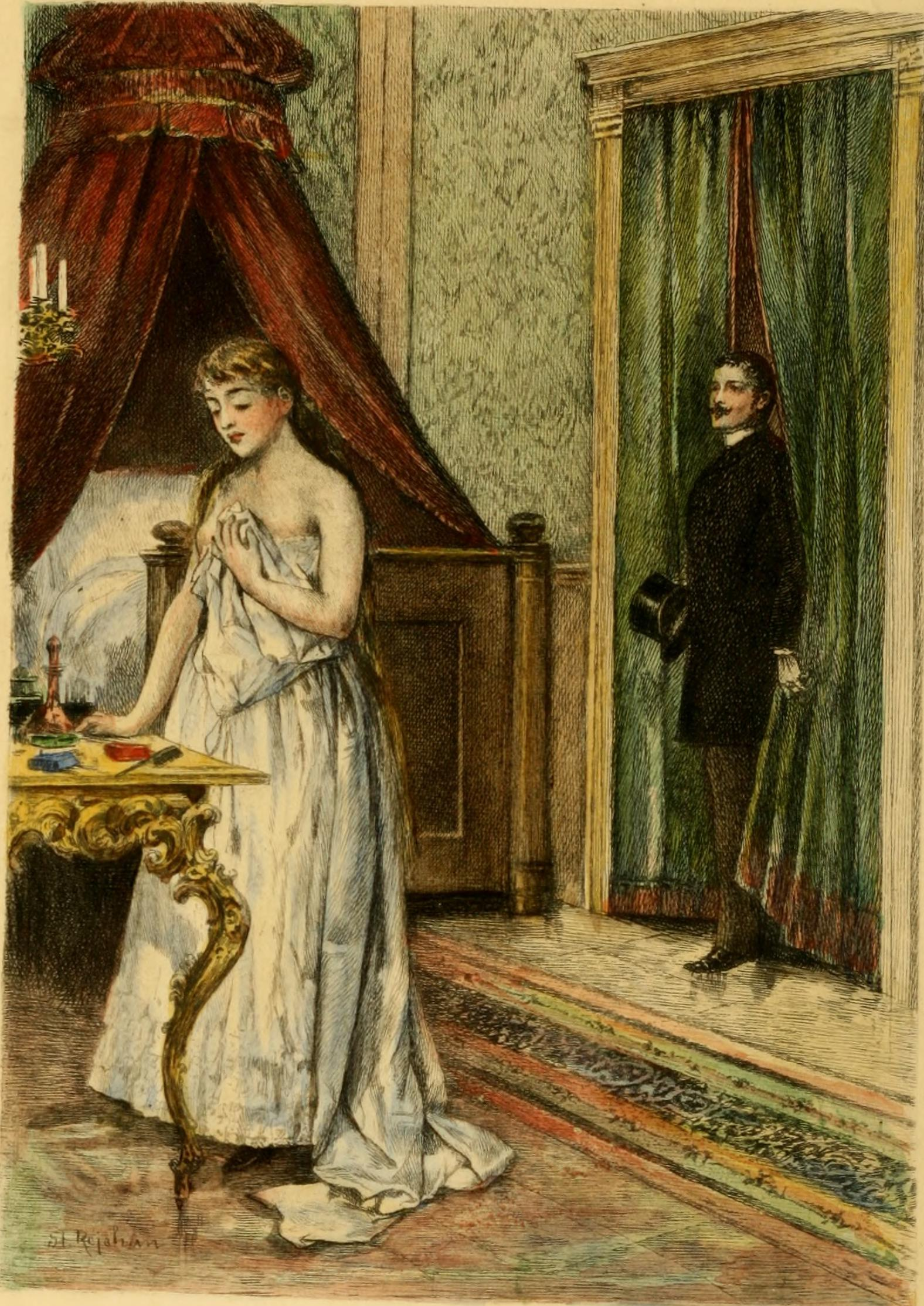
An 1885 engraved illustration produced by Louveau-Rouveyre after Stanislaw Rejchan for Monsieur de Camors by Octave Feuillet

She was married to the painter Ernest Rouveyre. Under her tutelage, their son Marcel Louveau-Rouveyre become an artist. Louveau-Rouveyre died in 1921, at age 69, at her home in Septeuil, Île-de-France, France. A road in Septeuil was named in her honor.
