= Flameng =

Flameng is a surname. Notable people with the surname include:

- François Flameng (1856–1923), French painter
- Léon Flameng (1877–1917), French cyclist and pilot
- Léopold Flameng (1831–1911), French engraver, illustrator, and painter
