= François Flameng =

French painter (1856–1923)

François Léopold Flameng
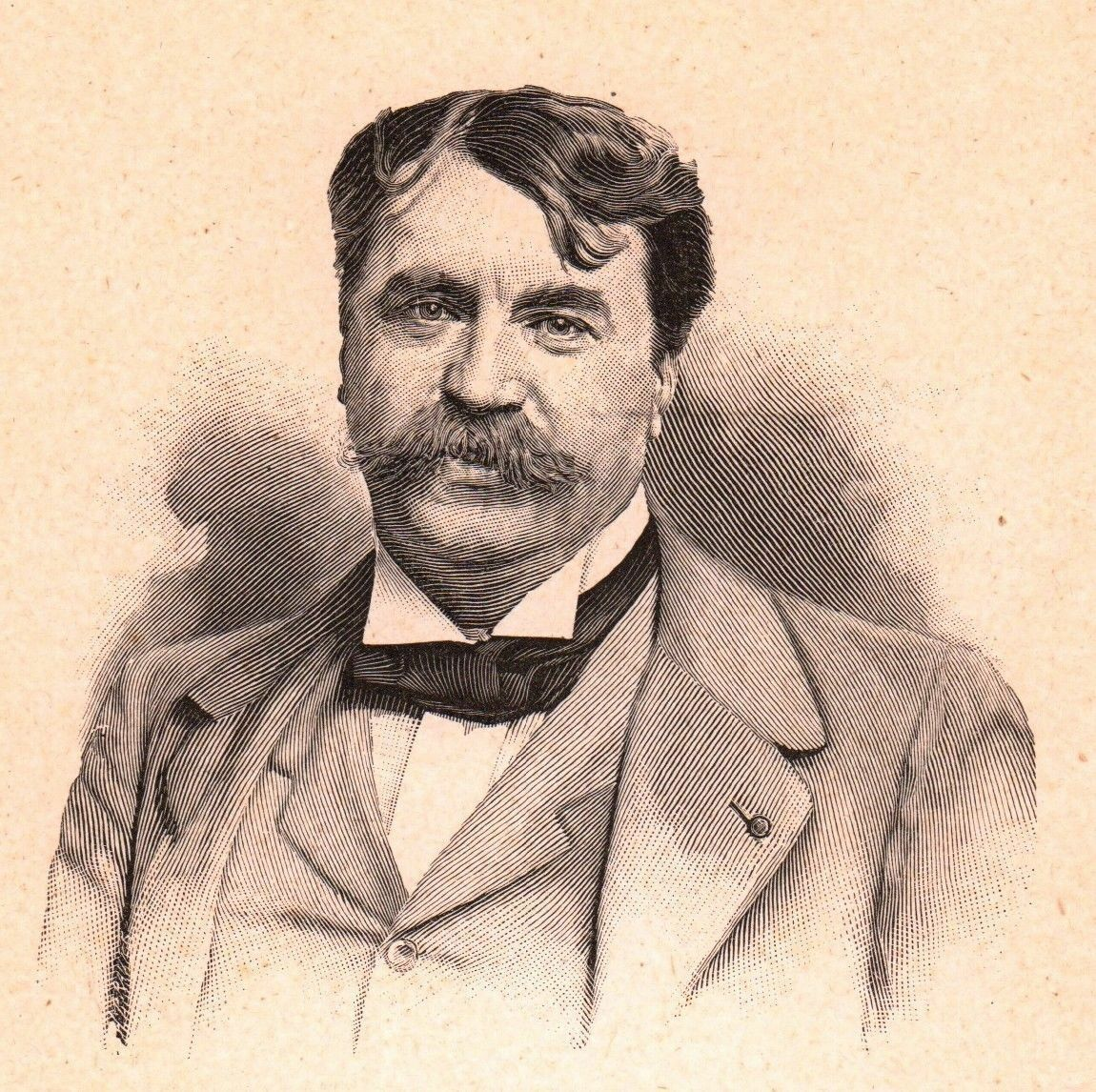
- Born: 6 December 1856; Paris, France
- Died: 28 February 1923 (aged 66); Paris, France
- Known for: Painting
- Spouse: Marguerite Henriette Augusta Turquet
- Children: 2, including Marie
- Father: Léopold Flameng

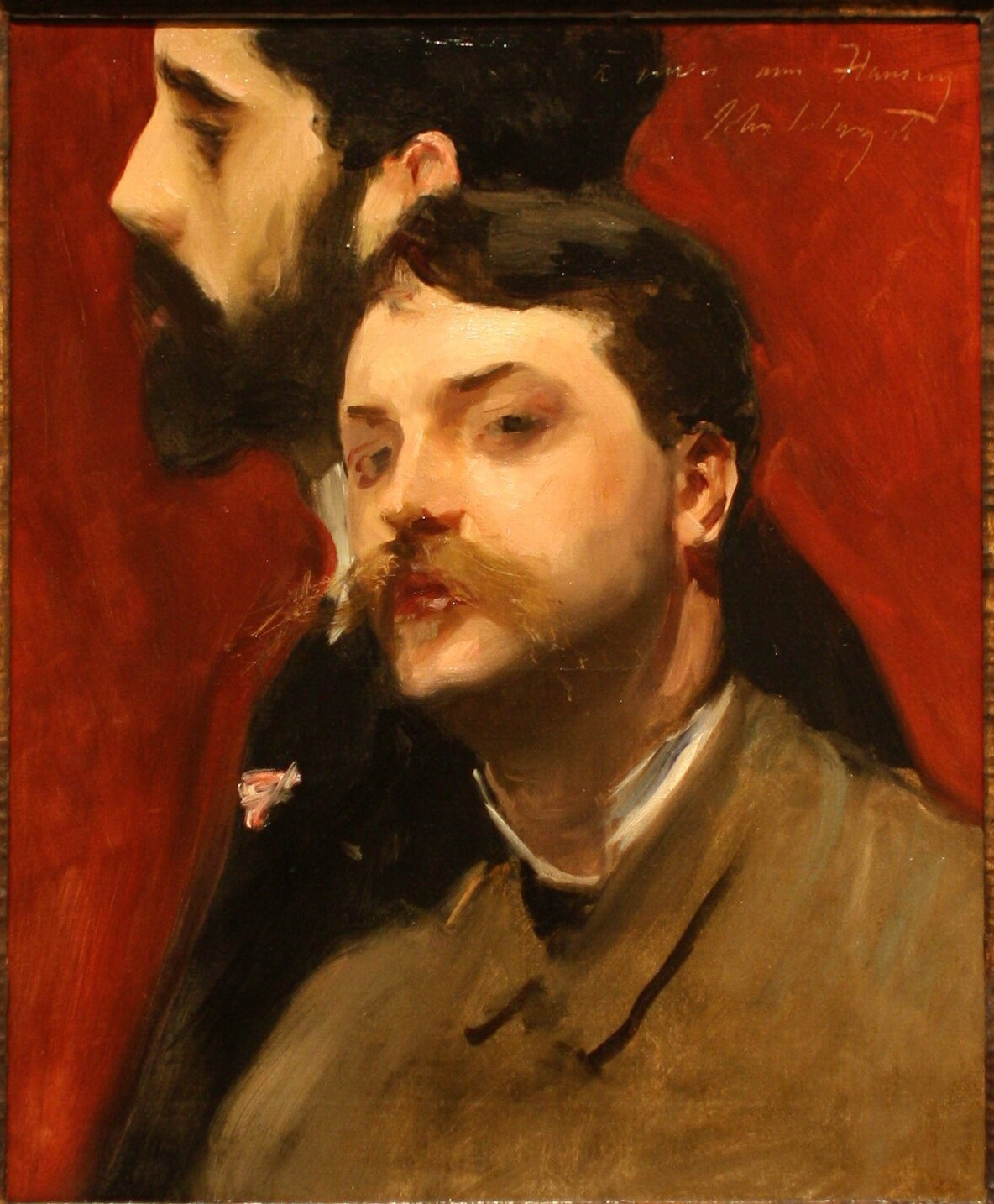
Flameng and Paul Helleu, by John Singer Sargent

François Léopold Flameng (6 December 1856 – 28 February 1923) was a French painter during the Belle Époque. He was the son of printmaker Léopold Flameng who educated him.

== Biography ==
Upon completing his studies with his father, he attended the École Nationale Supérieure des Beaux-arts, where his primary instructor was Alexandre Cabanel. Beginning in 1870, he made reproductions of the works of several famous artists, for the catalogue of the Durand-Ruel gallery. He made his debut at the Salon of 1875 with his painting The Lectern.

In 1881, he married Henriette Augusta Turque (1863–1919); the daughter of Edmond Turquet, the Undersecretary of State. They would have two daughters: Jean (1882–1915) and Marie (1884–1969), who married the tennis player Max Decugis. Their friends, John Singer Sargent and Paul Helleu, were regular guests at their home.

In 1891, He designed sketches for the first French bank note to be produced with the four-color process. A 1000 Franc note with the design was created in 1897, but never issued. It was used for a 500 Franc note in 1938, with different colors.

Tsar Alexander III invited him to Gatchina Palace in 1894, to create portraits of members of the Imperial Court and other aristocrats. From 1895 to 1897 he was one of six artists who participated in decorating the new Salle Favart, home of the Opéra-Comique. In 1900, he created a decorative mural of Paris at Le Train Bleu, a restaurant in the main hall of the Gare de Lyon.

In 1905, he was named a Professor at the National School of Fine Arts. That same year, he was elected to a seat at the Academy of Fine Arts, replacing William Bouguereau. In 1912, he was elected Mayor of the commune of Courgent; holding that post until 1917.

He was one of the first Army Painters to join an Army mission in 1914, going straight to front in Aisne. There, he made sketches that he turned into paintings when he returned to his studio. In 1919, a few months after the war ended, his wife died from a disease she contracted while volunteering at a hospital in Mantes-la-Jolie. The following year, he was named a Commander in the Legion of Honor for his wartime service. He was also named honorary president of the "Society of Military Painters" and an accredited documenter for the Ministry of War.

That same year, he donated most of his war paintings to the Musée de l'Armée and put his private collection up for sale at the Georges Petit Gallery

He had suffered from diabetes for many years, and died at his home two days after a leg amputation, aged sixty-six. He was buried next to his wife and father at the Septeuil Cemetery.

== Gallery ==
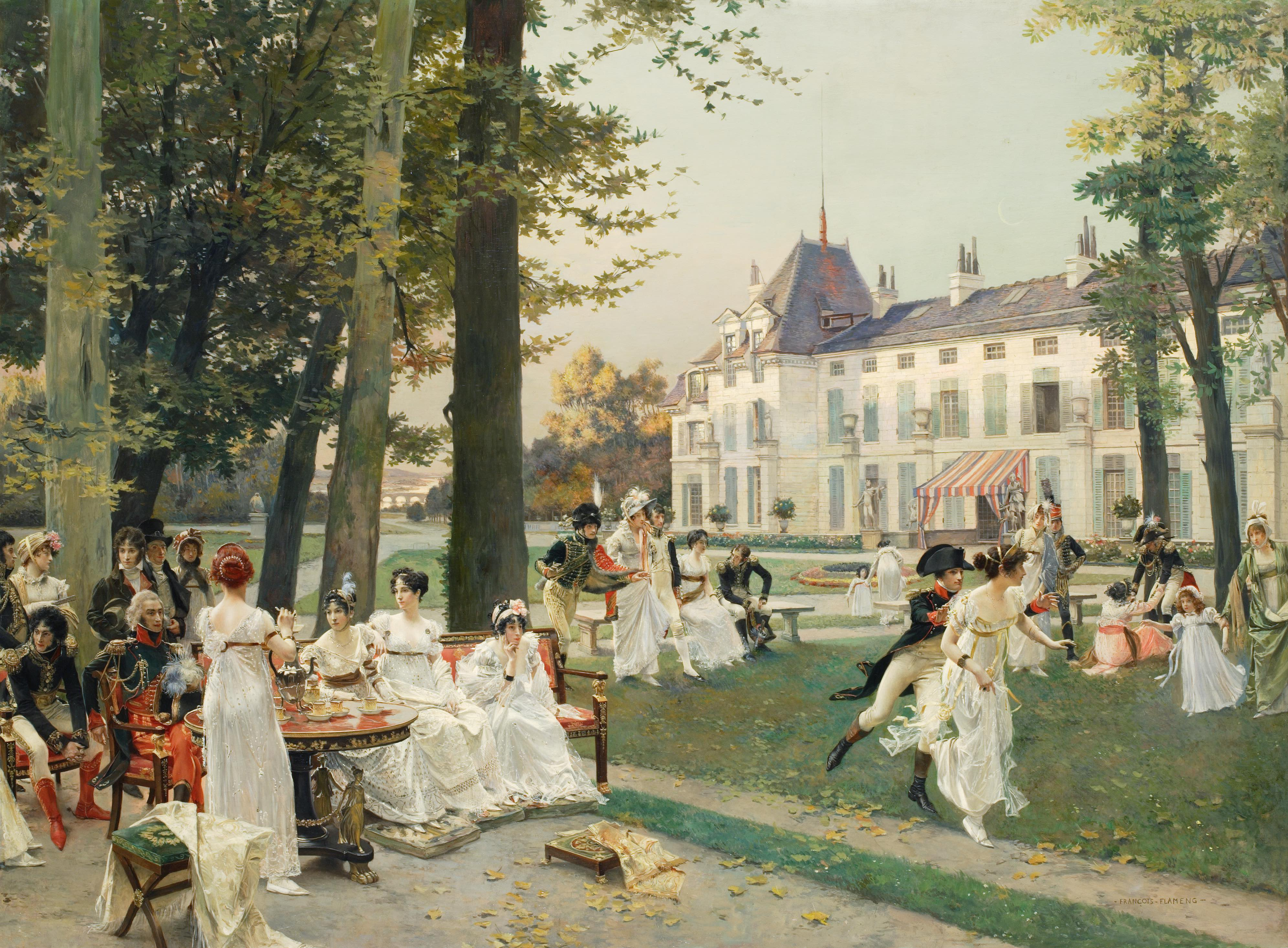
Reception at Malmaison in 1802 (circa 1894)

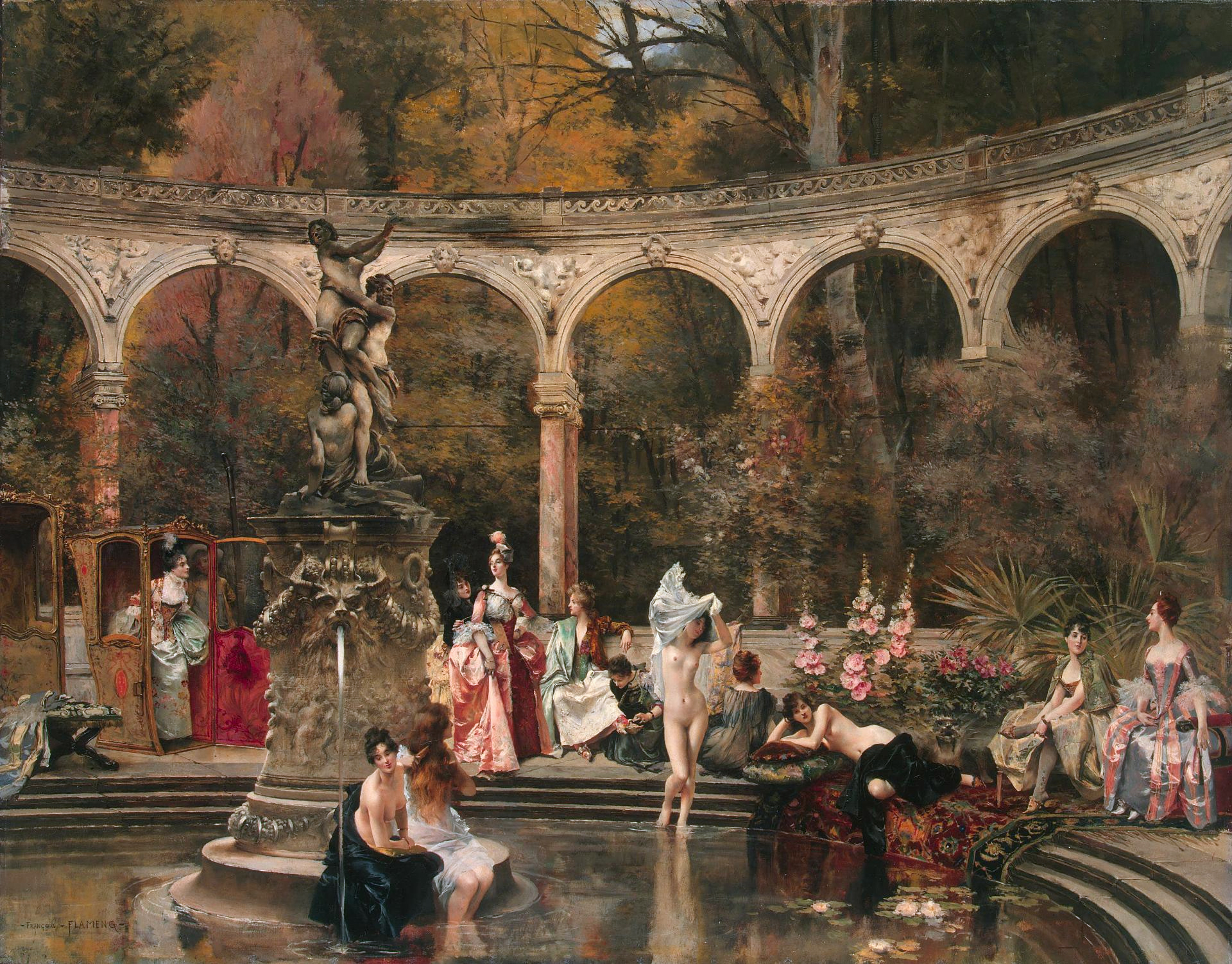
Court Ladies Bathing in the 18th Century (1888)

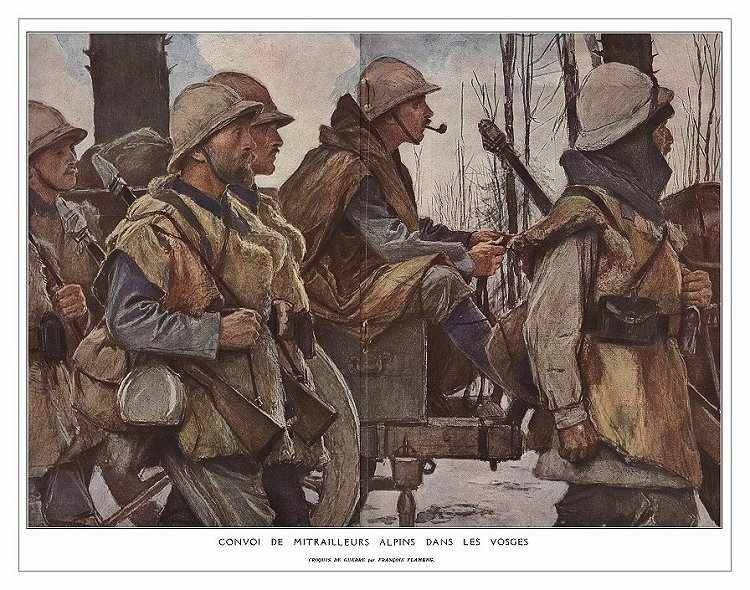
A Machine Gun Company of Chasseurs Alpins in the Barren Winter Landscape of the Vosges

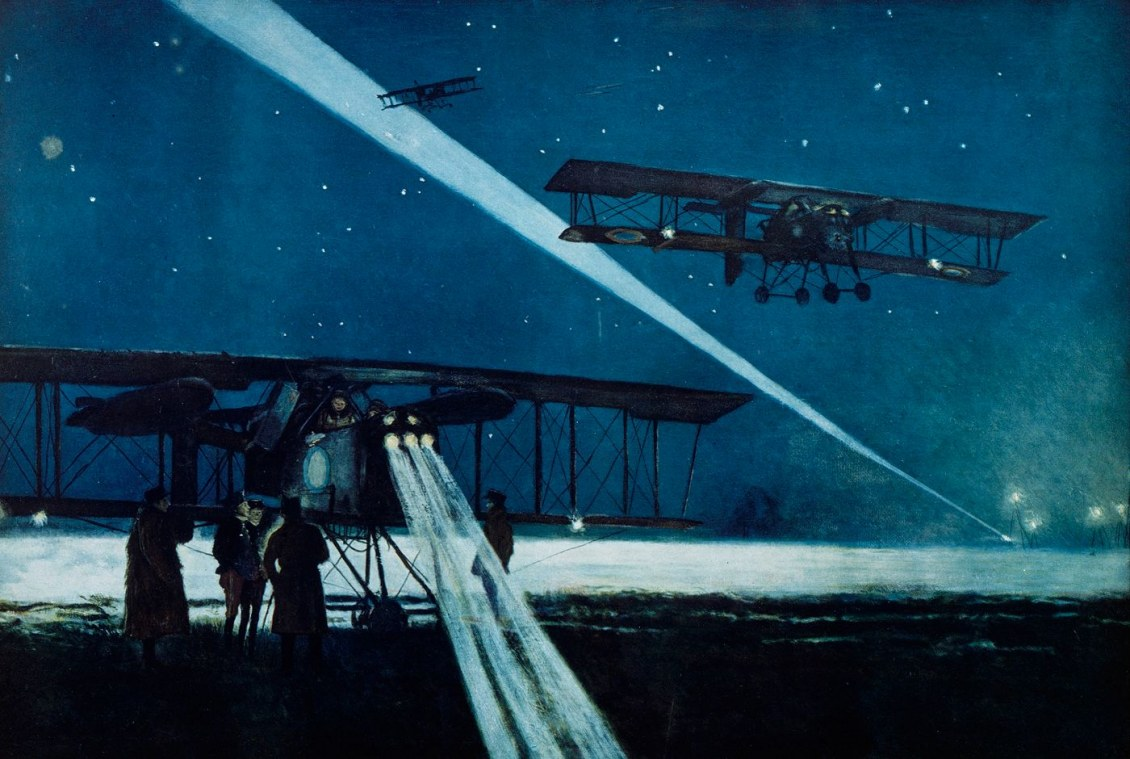
Return from a Night Flight on “Voisin” Bombing Planes (1918)

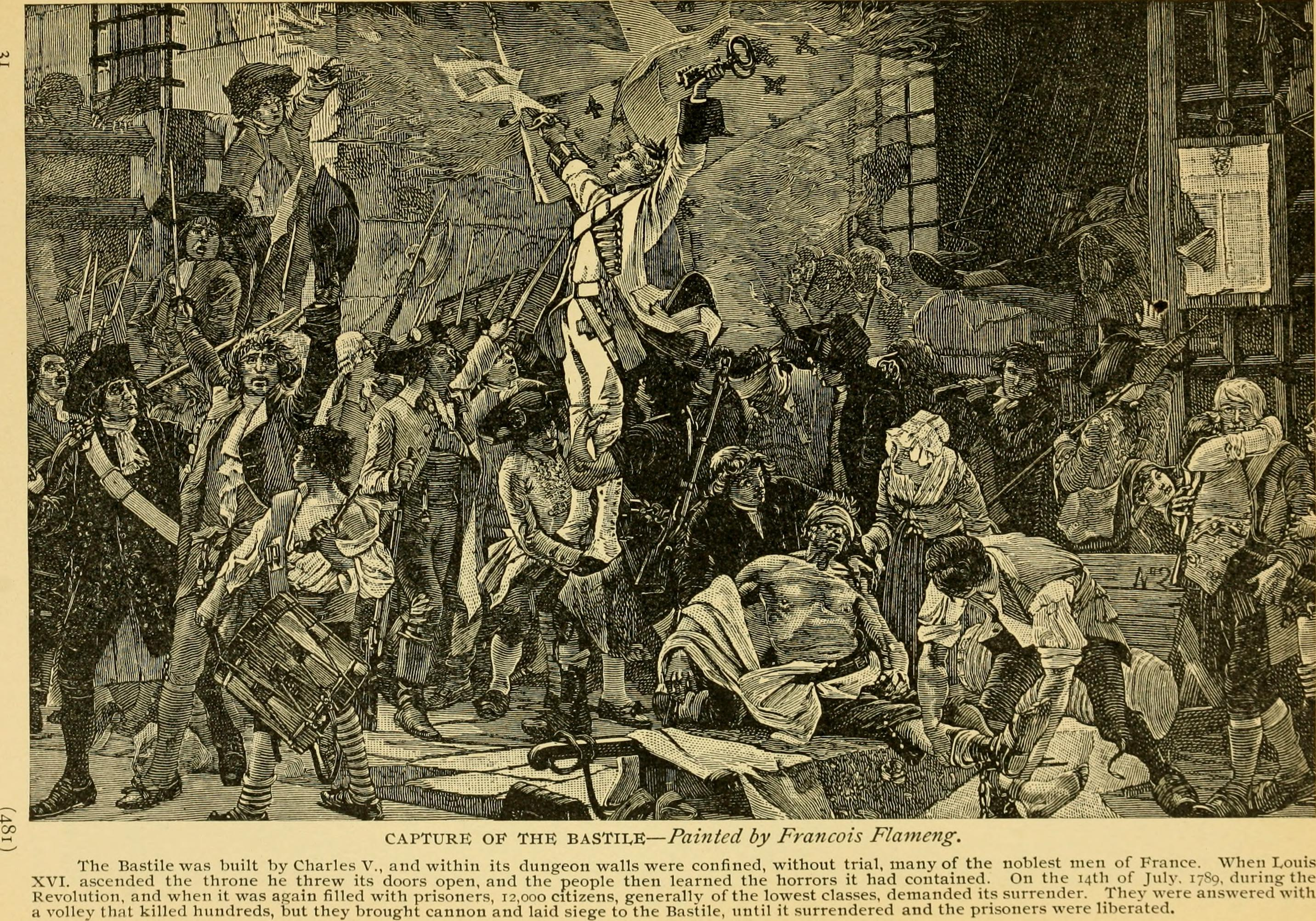
Illustration from The pathway of life .. to which is added a biography of Dr. Talmage (1888)

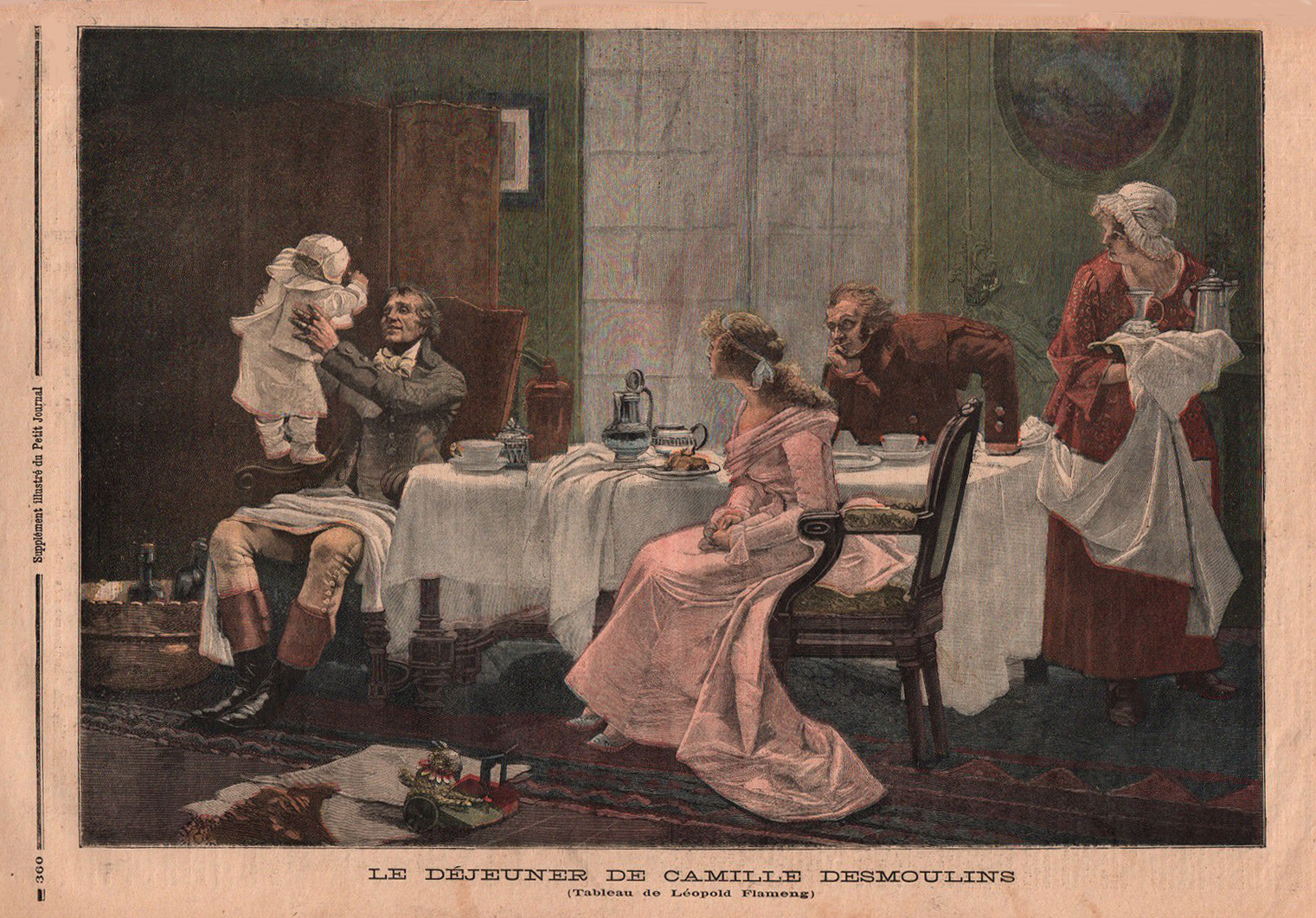
The Lunch of Camille Desmoulins, in Illustrated supplement to the Petit Journal (5 November 1892).

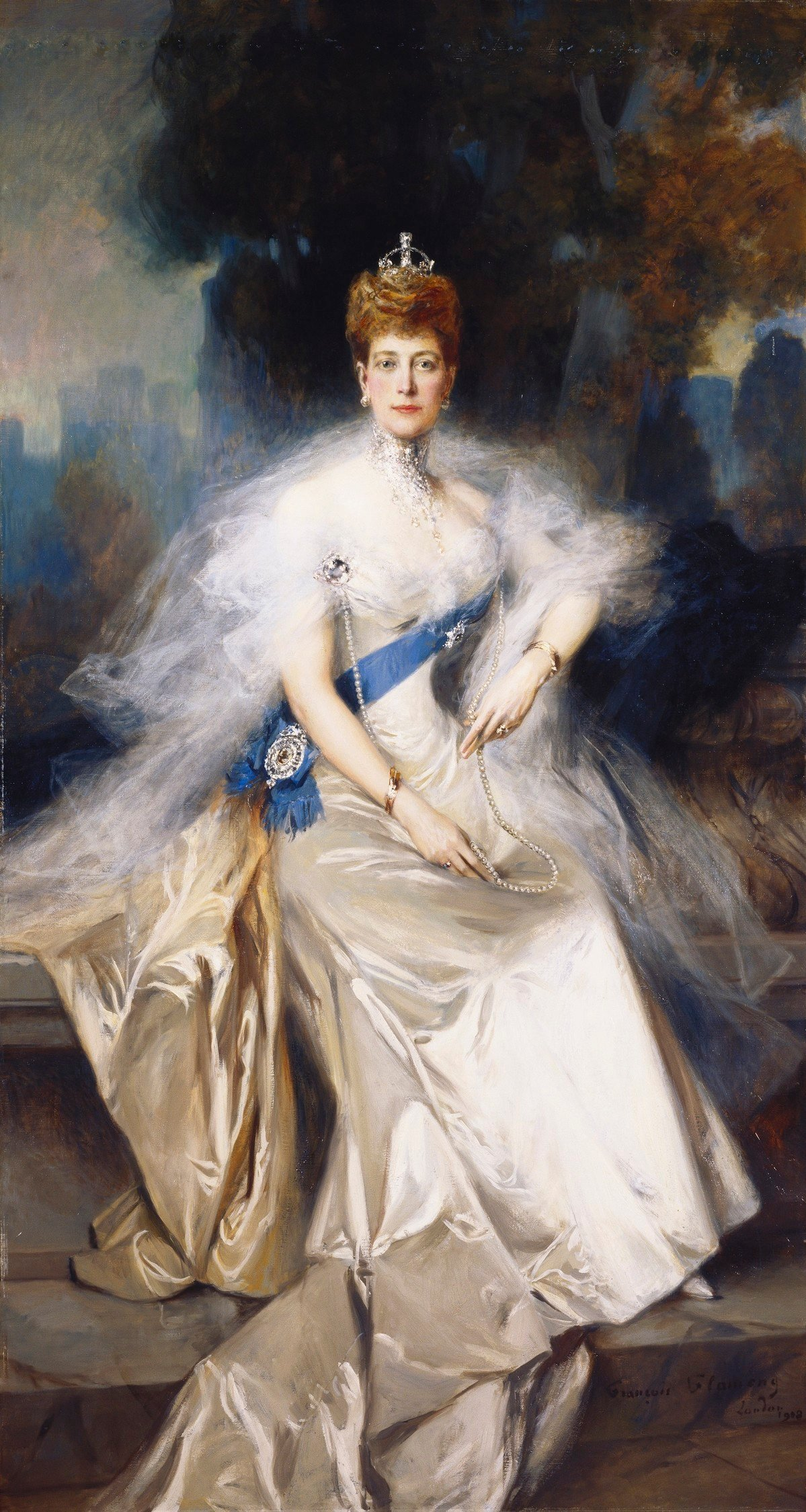
Queen Alexandra of the United Kingdom (1908)

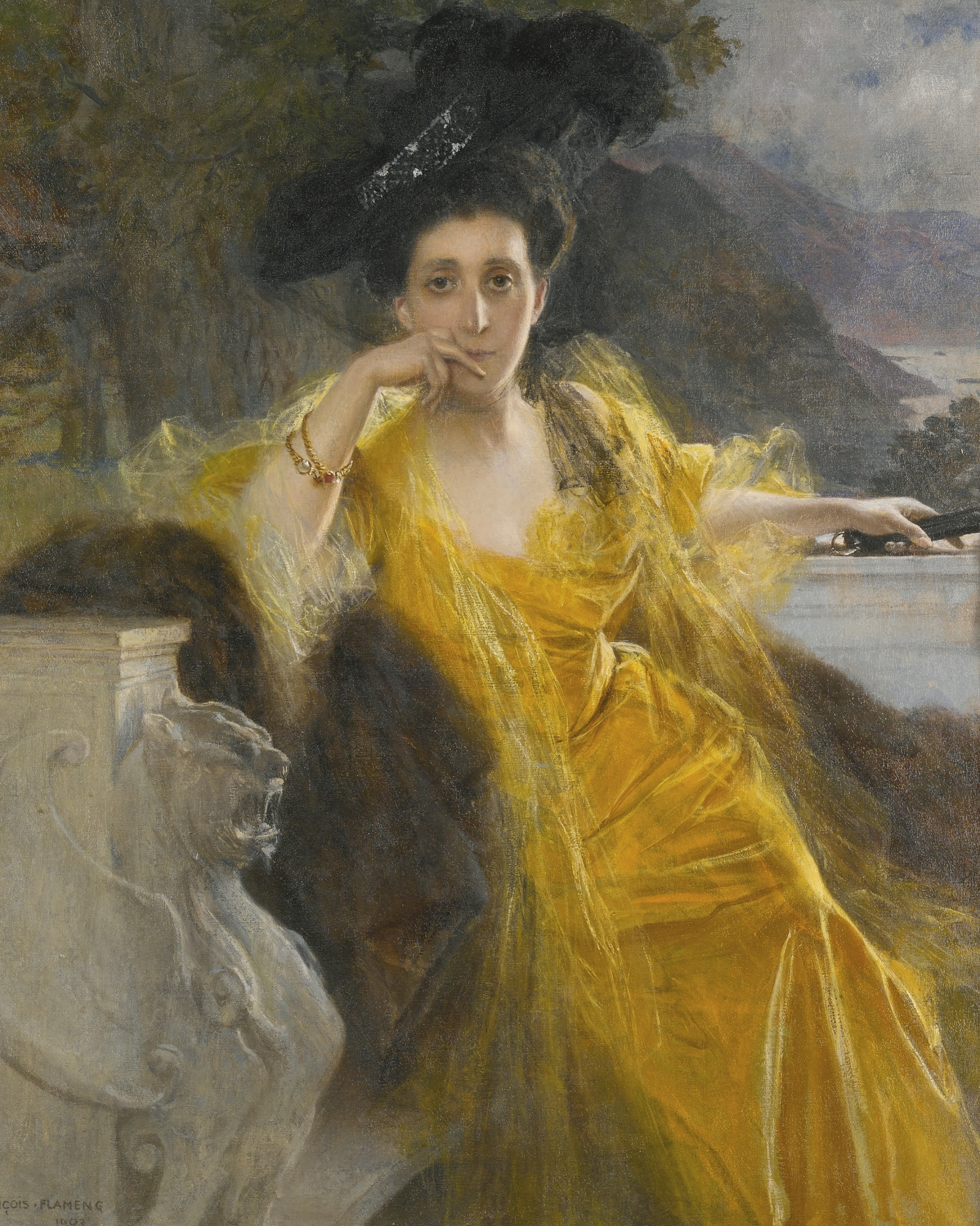
Mme Marie-Louise Heine-Fould (1903)

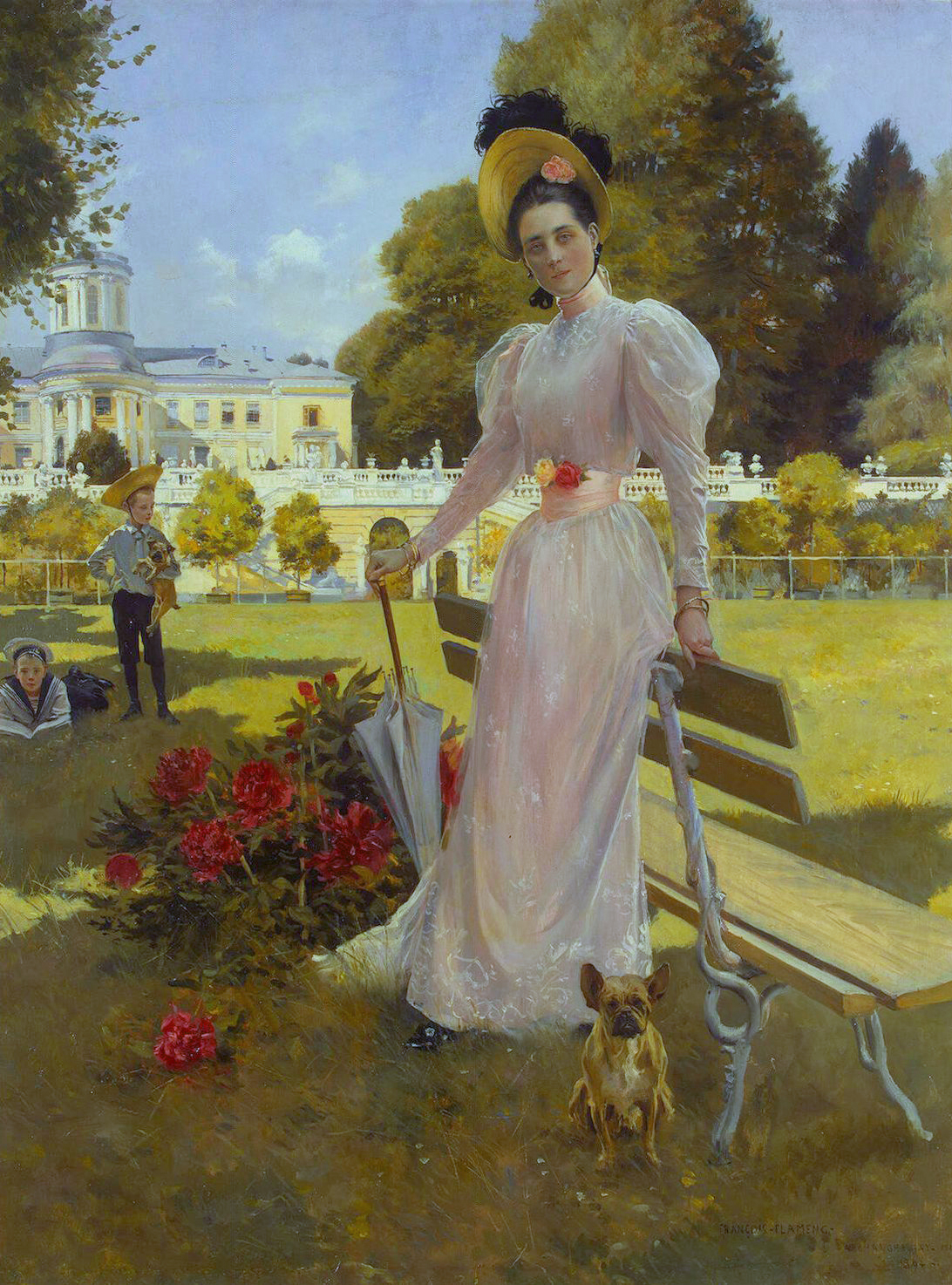
Princess Zinaida Yusupova with Her Sons at Arkhangelskoye Palace (1894)

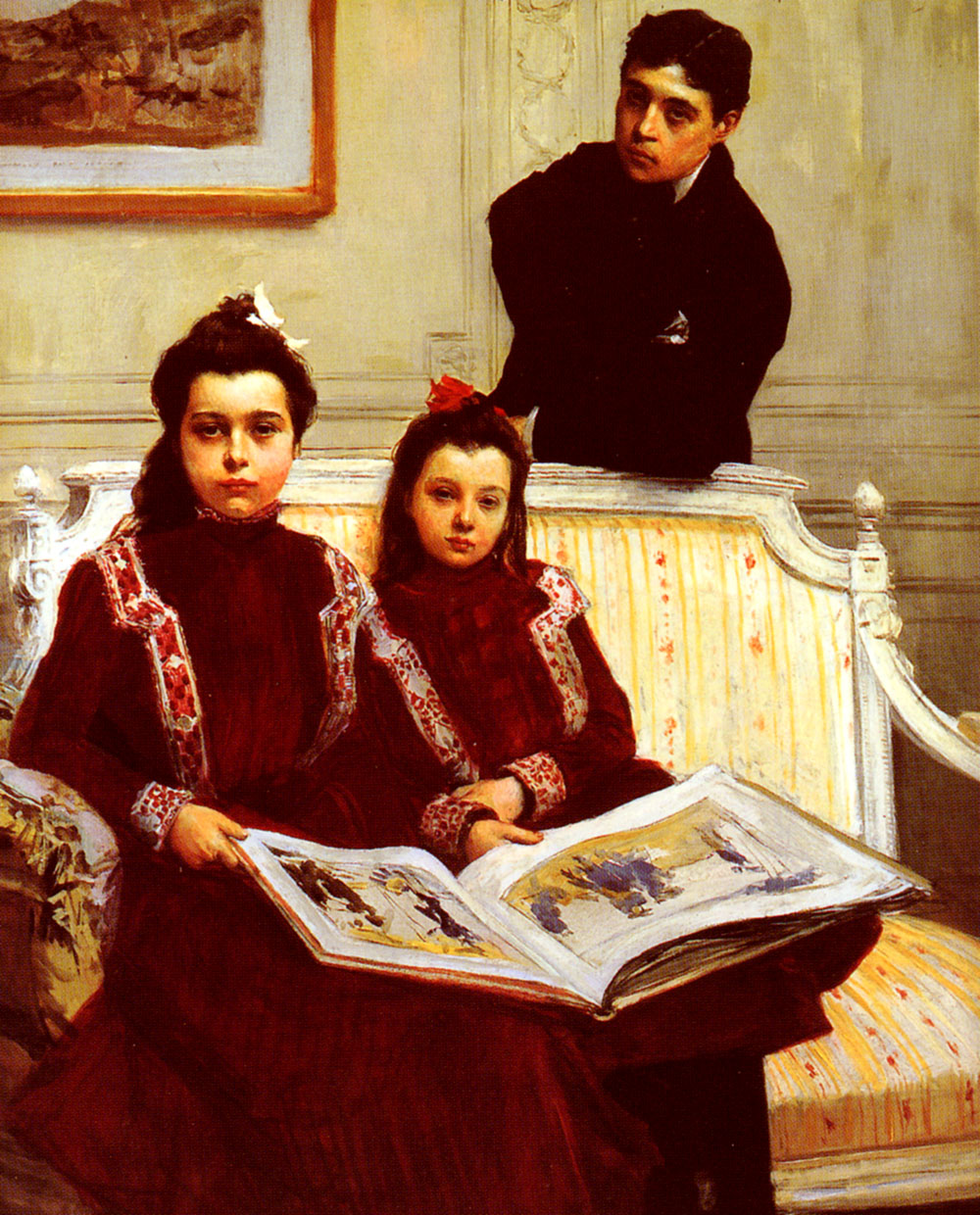
Brother and Sisters (also called "The Picture Book" and "Family Portrait of a Boy and his Two Sisters Admiring a Sketch Book", 1900)

== Works ==
Flameng's portraits include:

- Family Portrait of a Boy and His Two Sisters
- Fashionable Beauty
- Portrait of a Girl Holding Her Two Toy Elephants
- Portrait of Auguste Rodin
- Two portraits of Princess Zinaida Yusupova in Arkhangelskoye
- Portrait of Elsie Salomon Duveen, wife of the art dealer Joseph Duveen, an oval in the Ferens Art Gallery, Kingston-upon-Hull.
- Portrait of Queen Alexandra, consort of King Edward VII, full-length seated, in the White Drawing Room at Buckingham Palace.

Flameng's history paintings include:

- The Carnival, Venice
- Court Ladies Bathing in the 18th century
- Grolier in the House of Aldus (at Grolier Club in New York)
- Molière Demanding an Audience With King Louis XIV at Versailles
- Napoléon Studying Military History
- Reception at Malmaison, 1802

Paintings of the first world war include:

- A Machine Gun Company of Chasseurs Alpins in the Barren Winter Landscape of the Vosges
- The Battle of the Yser in 1914
- The Donkey, Somme, 1916
- The Forgotten Front
- Heavy Artillery on the Railway, October 1916
