= Léopold Flameng =

French engraver, illustrator and painter

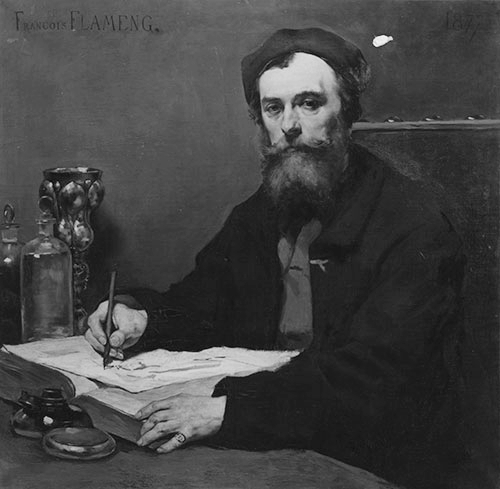
Léopold Flameng; portrait by his son, François (1877)

Léopold Flameng (22 November 1831 – 5 September 1911) was a French engraver, illustrator and painter.

== Biography ==
He was born in Brussels. His parents were from France, and he began his artistic studies in Paris with Luigi Calamatta and Jean Gigoux. His engraving skills were noticed by Charles Blanc, and his collaboration with his fellow engraver, Léon Gaucherel, in the Gazette des Beaux-Arts and L'Artiste, helped to ensure his reputation. He eventually provided over one hundred illustrations.

In 1858, he was involved in an unfortunate incident when the artist Charles Meryon, who was suffering from a mental illness, attempted to tear up Flameng's recently completed portrait of him. Shortly after, Meryon entered a hospital. Flameng paid a visit to him there and made some sketches.

Known for his etchings of works by Jan van Eyck, Leonardo da Vinci, Rembrandt, Ingres and Delacroix, he illustrated several books on Paris and numerous literary works of classical and contemporary authors, including Boccaccio, Paul Scarron, Victor Hugo and François Coppée. He was also the illustrator for the 1868 Revised edition of Picciola by X. B. Saintine, published after his death in 1865.

He was a medallist at the Exposition Universelle of 1878. By 1882, he had become a noted art collector. From 1884, he was also a member of "Le Parnasse-Club" and later joined the Société d'aquarellistes français. He was named an Officer in the Legion of Honor in 1894. and elected a member of the Académie des Beaux-Arts in 1898.

His numerous students included Richard Geiger, Auguste Laguillermie, and Paul Adolphe Rajon, as well as his son, François.

Flameng died in 1911 in Courgent.

== Gallery ==
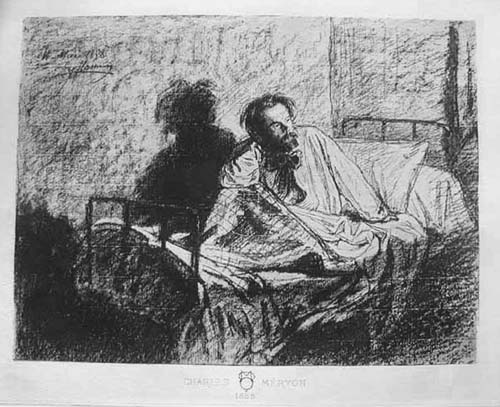
Charles Meryon on His Sick Bed (1858)

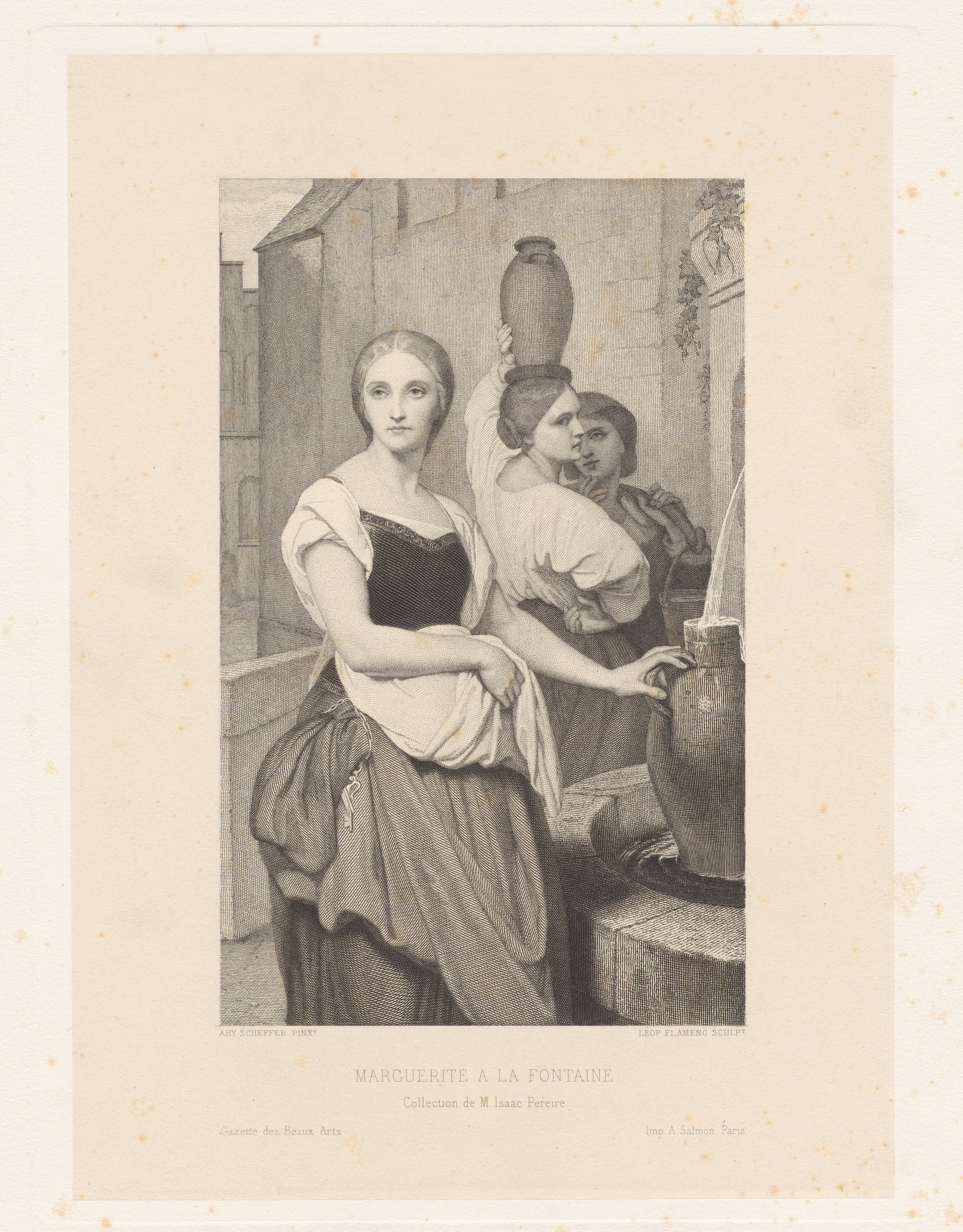
Marguérite at the fountain
(after Ary Scheffer)

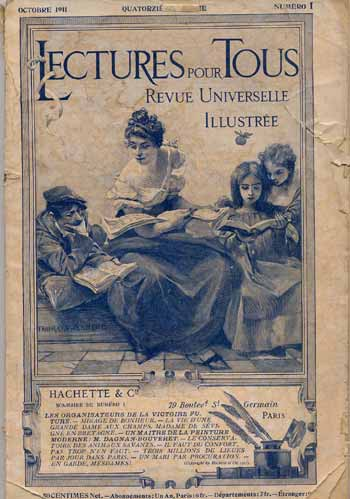
Cover of Lectures Pour Tous (1911)

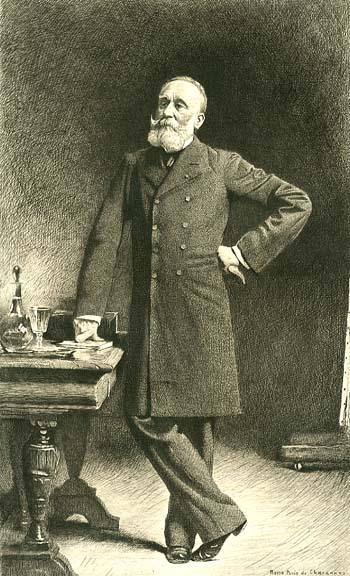
Pierre Puvis de Chavannes
(after Léon Bonnat)

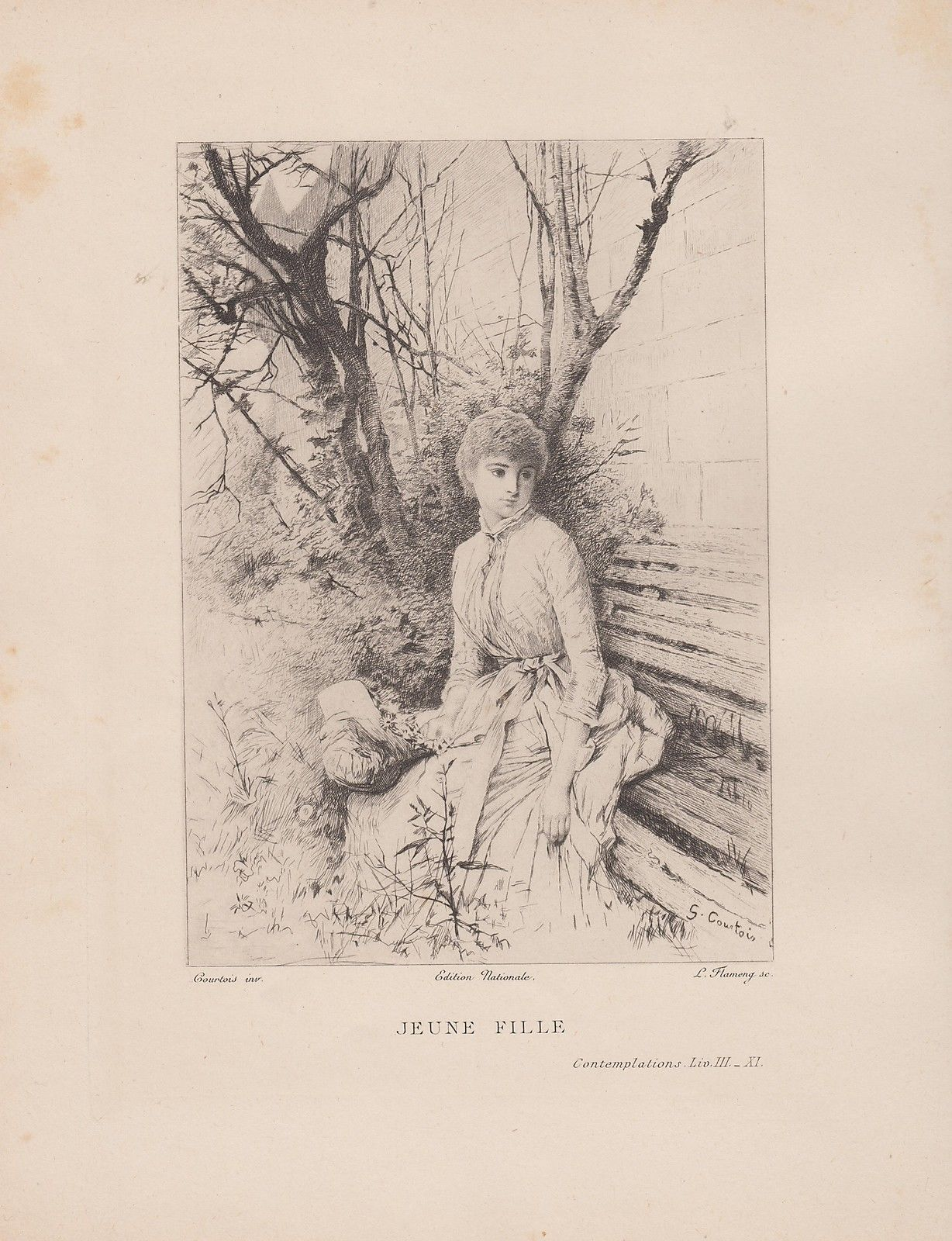
Young girl
(after Gustave Courtois)

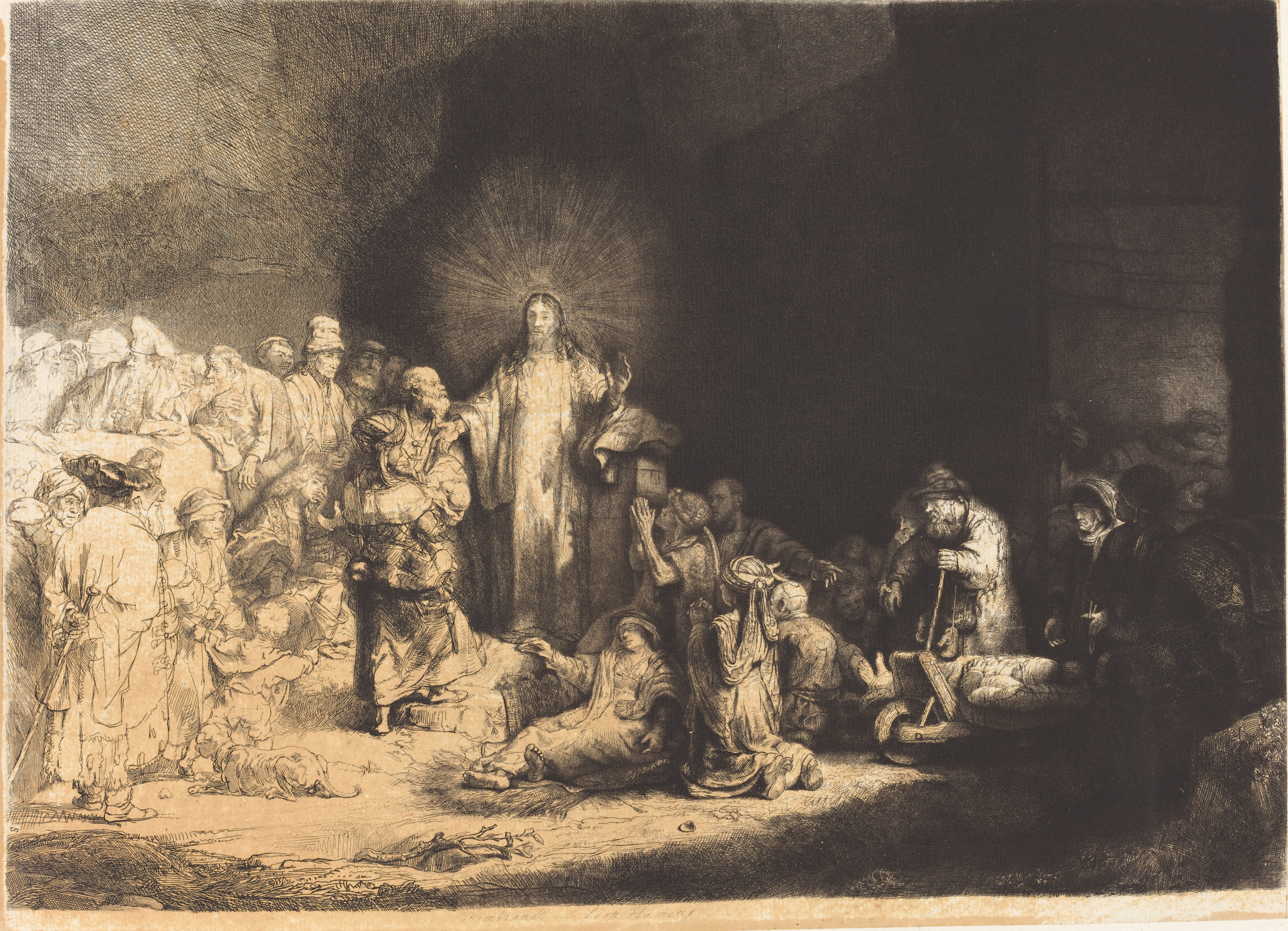
"The Hundred Guilder Print" (Christ Receiving the Sick, after Rembrandt)
