= Mantes-la-Ville =

- Commune
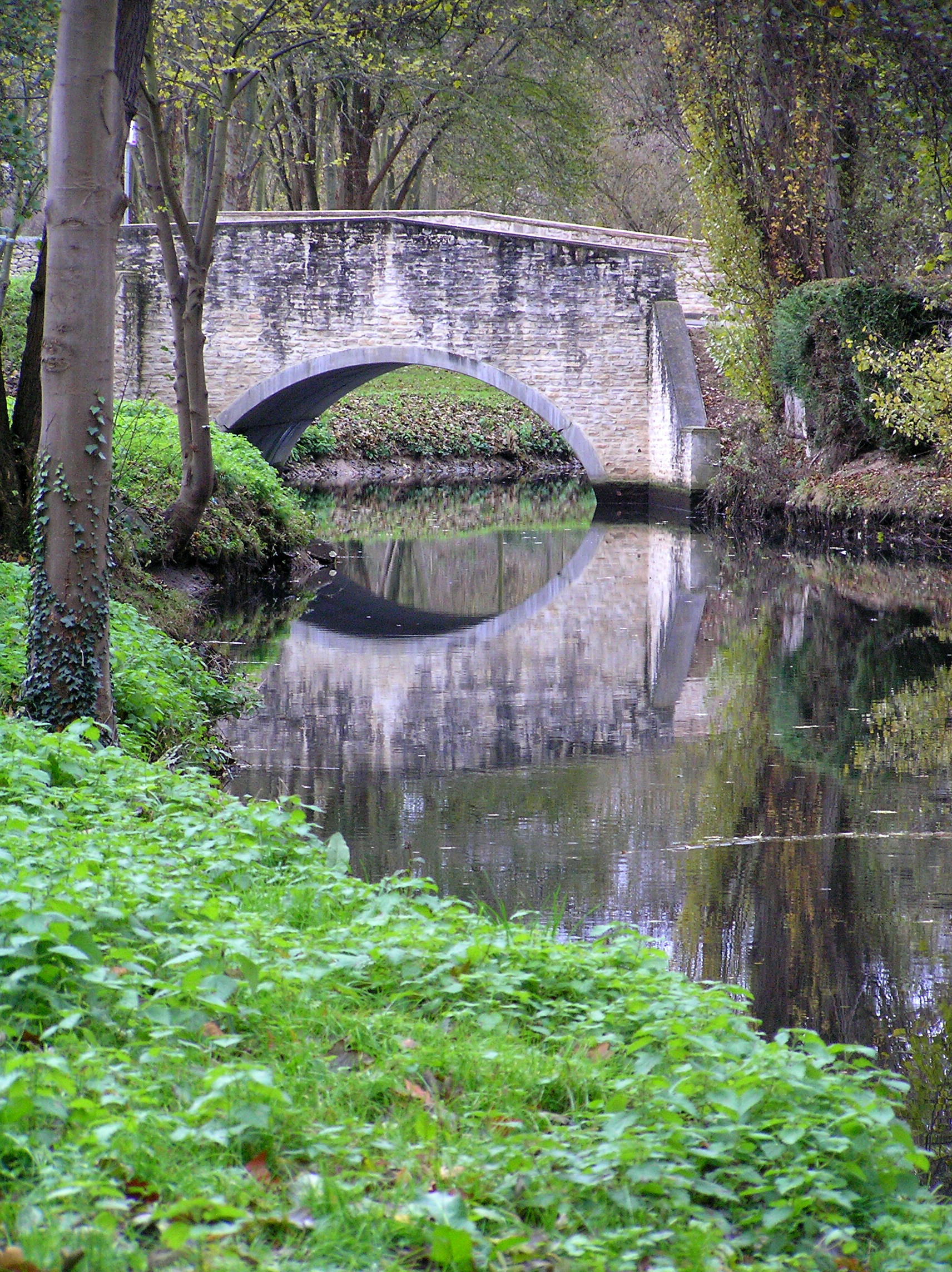
- Mantes bridge over the Vaucouleurs

- Coat of arms
- Location of Mantes-la-Ville
- Location within France Location within Île-de-France (region)
- Coordinates: 48°58′30″N 1°42′42″E
- Country: France
- Region: Île-de-France
- Department: Yvelines
- Arrondissement: Mantes-la-Jolie
- Canton: Mantes-la-Jolie
- Intercommunality: CU Grand Paris Seine et Oise

Government
  - Mayor (2026–2032): Sami Damergy
- Area^{1}: 6.06 km^{2} (2.34 sq mi)
- Highest elevation: 114 m (374 ft)
- Lowest elevation: 17 m (56 ft)
- Population (2023): 22,332
  - Density: 3,690/km^{2} (9,540/sq mi)
- Demonym(s): Mantevillois (masculine); Mantevilloise (feminine)
- Time zone: UTC+01:00 (CET)
  - Summer (DST): UTC+02:00 (CEST)
- INSEE/Postal code: 78362 /78711
- ^{1} French Land Register data, which excludes lakes, ponds, glaciers > 1 km^{2} (0.386 sq mi or 247 acres) and river estuaries.

Mantes-la-Ville (French pronunciation: [mɑ̃t la vil]) is a commune in the Yvelines department in the Île-de-France region in north-central France. It is located in the western suburbs of Paris 48.6 km (30.2 mi) from the center.

Mantes-la-Ville is located at the confluence of the Seine and the Vaucouleurs. The Paris–Rouen rail line separates Mantes-la-Ville from the larger commune of Mantes-la-Jolie. The A13 autoroute to Normandy also passes through Mantes-la-Ville.

== History ==
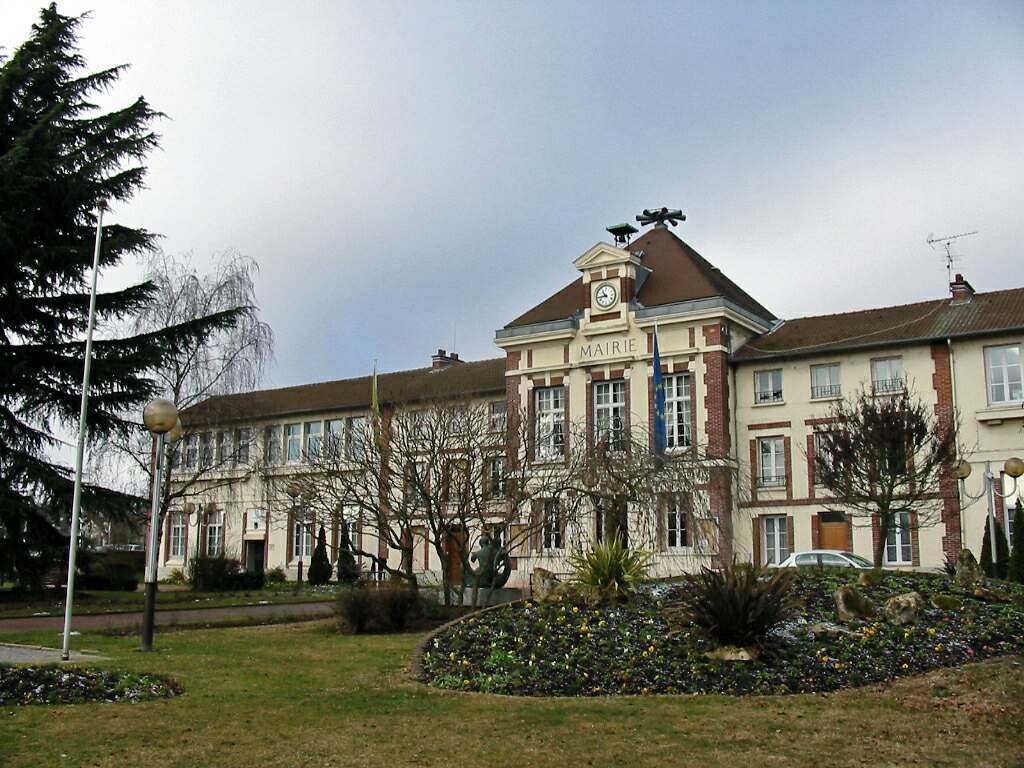
The Hôtel de Ville

The Hôtel de Ville was completed in 1886.

== Population ==
Inhabitants are called Mantevillois in French. Approximately one-third of the town's population is Muslim.

Historical population

Year	Pop.	±% p.a.
1793	811	—
1821	788	−0.10%
1846	971	+0.84%
1872	932	−0.16%
1886	1,211	+1.89%
1901	1,859	+2.90%
1911	2,322	+2.25%
1921	2,720	+1.59%
1926	3,604	+5.79%
1931	5,414	+8.48%
1936	6,011	+2.11%
1946	5,780	−0.39%

Year	Pop.	±% p.a.
1954	6,670	+1.81%
1962	10,319	+5.61%
1968	14,632	+5.99%
1975	16,708	+1.91%
1982	17,360	+0.55%
1990	19,081	+1.19%
1999	19,231	+0.09%
2007	18,739	−0.32%
2012	19,944	+1.25%
2017	20,452	+0.50%
2023	22,332	+1.48%

Source: EHESS and INSEE (1968-2023)

== Economy ==
Mantes-la-Ville is the headquarters of two world-renowned makers of wind instruments: Henri Selmer and Buffet Crampon.

Eduard Beaugnier et Cie, another saxophone manufacturer, was also based in Mantes until the company closed down in the early 1970s. Beaugnier manufactured saxophones under their own name, and also as "stencils" for other companies under names such as Noblet, Vito and Revere. Though not as well known as the instruments of Henri Selmer, Beaugnier instruments have a good reputation amongst saxophone enthusiasts. Another high-quality saxophone manufacturer based in Mantes was Dolnet, whose factory closed down in the late 1970s.

There is an industrial park on the old site of Cellophane.

== Twin towns ==
- (United Kingdom) Chigwell, Essex, England
- (United Kingdom) Hillingdon, Greater London, England
- Neunkirchen, Saarland, Germany

== Transport ==
Mantes-la-Ville is served by Mantes-Station station, an interchange station on the Transilien Paris-Saint-Lazare and Transilien Paris-Montparnasse suburban rail lines.

== Culture ==
The Mantes-la-Ville Orchestral Ensemble is led by Jean-Luc Fillon

== Education ==
There are 15 communal primary schools. There are also two junior high schools Les Plaisances (opened in 1968) and de la Vaucouleurs (has 615 students as of 2016), and one vocational high school, Lycée Camille Claudel (des métiers de l'accompagnement aux personnes, du commerce et de l'hôtellerie-restauration).

Universities:

- ISTY
- Versailles Saint-Quentin-en-Yvelines University

== See also ==
- Communes of the Yvelines department
