= Hôtel de Ville, Mantes-la-Ville =

Town hall in Mantes-la-Ville, France

Hôtel de Ville
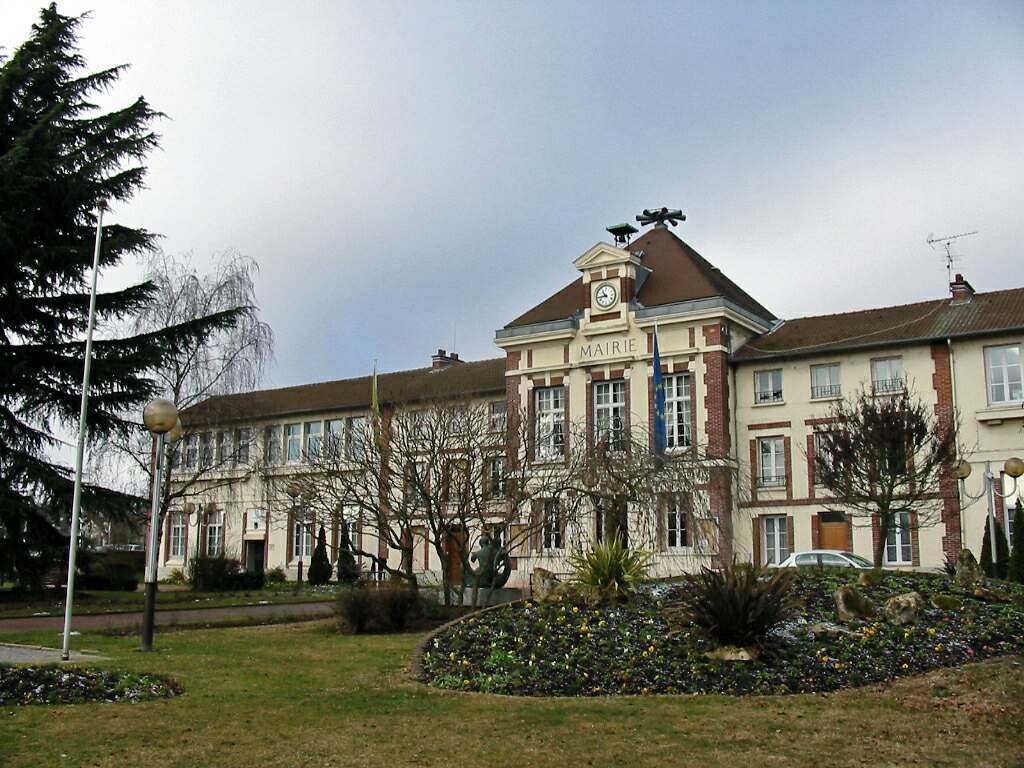
- The main frontage of the Hôtel de Ville in March 2006
- Interactive map of the Hôtel de Ville area

General information
- Type: City hall
- Architectural style: Neoclassical style
- Location: Mantes-la-Ville, France
- Coordinates: 48.9780°N 1.7135°E
- Completed: 1886

The Hôtel de Ville (French pronunciation: [otɛl də vil], City Hall) is a municipal building in Mantes-la-Ville, Yvelines, in the northwestern suburbs of Paris, standing on Place de la Mairie.

== History ==
Following the French Revolution, the new town council initially met at the home of the mayor at the time. This arrangement continued until the early 1880s, when the council led by the mayor, Daniel Constant-Gautie, decided to commission a combined town hall and school. The site they selected was on the west side of what is now Route de Houdan. The foundation stone for the new building was laid on 14 July 1884. It was designed in the neoclassical style, built in red brick with stone dressings and was completed in 1886.

The design involved a long main frontage of nineteen bays facing onto Route de Houdan. The main block of nine bays, which accommodated the town hall and was two-storeys high, comprised a three bay central section, which was projected forward, and two outer sections of three bays each. The central section featured a doorway with banded pilasters, voussoirs and a keystone and was fenestrated by casement windows with cornices on both floors. At roof level, there was an entablature and a clock with a pediment above the central bay. The outer sections of the main block and the wings of five bays each, which accommodated the classrooms and were originally only one storey high, were also fenestrated by casement windows.

A war memorial, consisting of a central stele and two side panels, which was intended to commemorate the lives of local service personnel who had died in the First World War, was designed by Guillaume Deschamps and installed in front of the town hall in the 1920s. Although over 400 houses in the town were damaged or destroyed by bombing by the US Ninth Air Force, intended to weaken German positions, between April and August 1944 during the Second World War, the town hall was among the public buildings which survived unscathed. The bombing continued until the town was liberated by the troops of the US Third Army, commanded by General George S. Patton, on 19 August 1944.

The outer sections of the main block and the wings were subsequently expanded by adding an extra floor to each. Internally, the principal room was the Salle du Conseil (council chamber). The school, which substantially expanded its footprint on land behind the town hall, was re-organised as a primary school in 1965 and became the École élémentaire Jean Jaurès (Jean Jaurès elementary school) in 1983.
