= Vaucouleurs (river) =

River in France

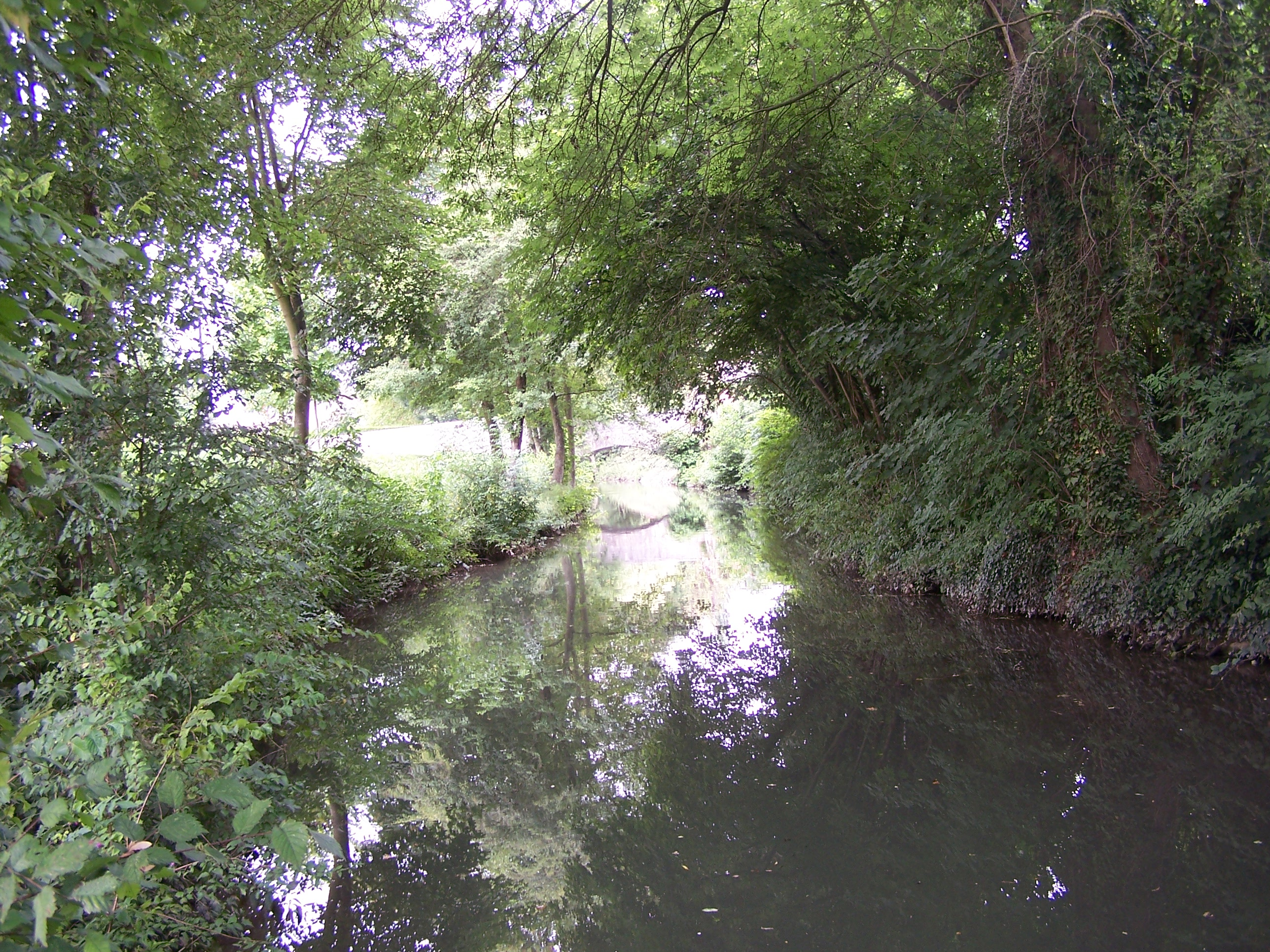
- The Vaucouleurs at Auffreville-Brasseuil

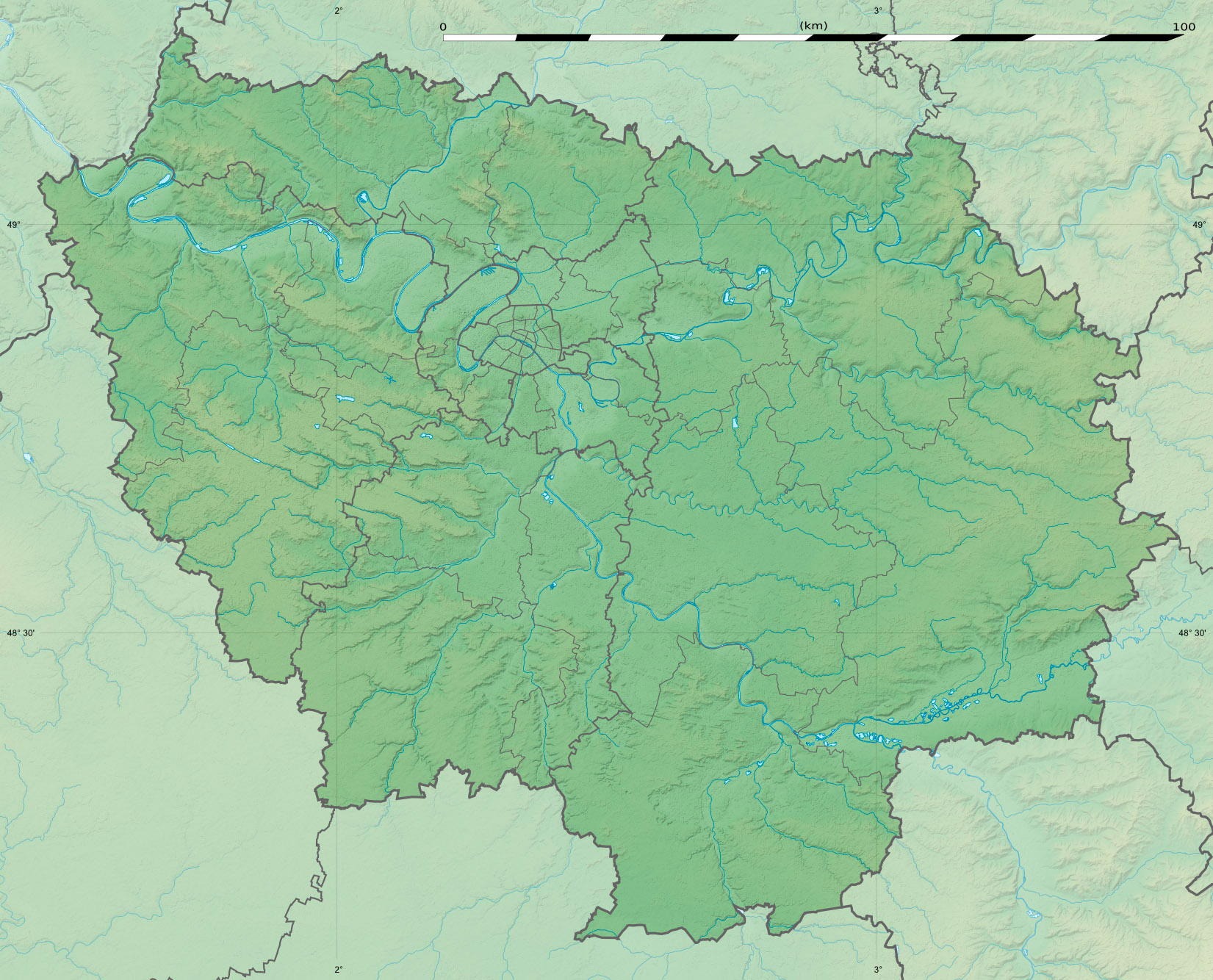
- Location within France Location within Île-de-France (region)

Location
- Country: France
- Region: Île-de-France
- District: Yvelines

Physical characteristics
- Source: Boissets
- Mouth: Seine
  - coordinates: 48.9821°N 1.7277°E
- Length: 22 km (14 mi)

Basin features
- Progression: Seine→ English Channel

The Vaucouleurs (French pronunciation: [vokulœʁ]) is a small river in the Île-de-France region of northern France. The name "Vaucouleurs" means "colorful valley."

== Geography ==
The Vaucouleurs is a tributary of the Seine river. It traverses one department, the Yvelines. The narrow waterway stretches for 22 kilometres (14 mi) before emptying into the Seine.

== Hydrology ==
In spite of the shortness of its course, the Vaucouleurs is subject to sudden flooding associated with thunderstorms, followed by rapidly decreasing water levels, which sometimes make it look like a stream but which are likely to cause serious damage in the lower part of its highly urbanized areas. Recent notable floods occurred in March 1989, December 2000 and March 2001. Sensors were installed upstream in Septeuil and Courgent to warn of flooding.
