= Auguste Laguillermie =

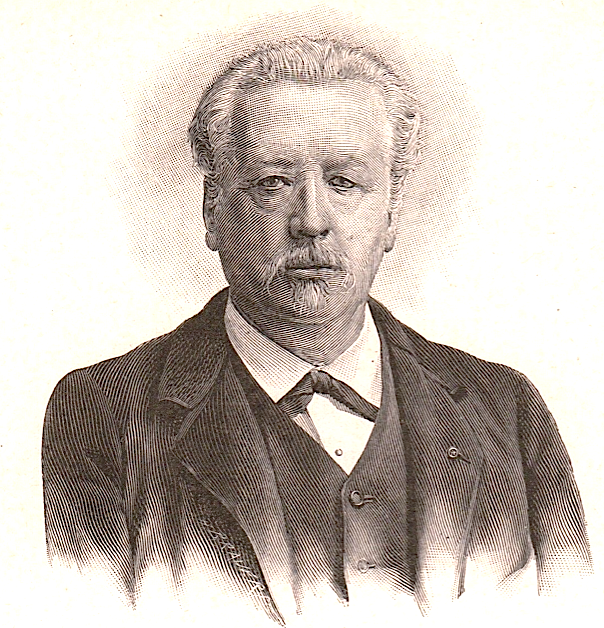
Auguste Laguillermie; from the Album Mariani (1913)

Frédéric-Auguste Laguillermie (27 March 1841, Paris – 14 December 1934, Paris) was a French etcher and painter. He was one of the founders of the Société des aquafortistes français.

== Biography ==
He was born to Eugénie, née Hime, and Frédéric-Guillaume Laguillermie (1805–1870), an engraver and printer, who was the associate cartographer for Victor Levasseur. He received his initial training in his father's studio then, in 1861, entered the École des Beaux-Arts, where he studied etching with Léopold Flameng, and painting with William Bouguereau.

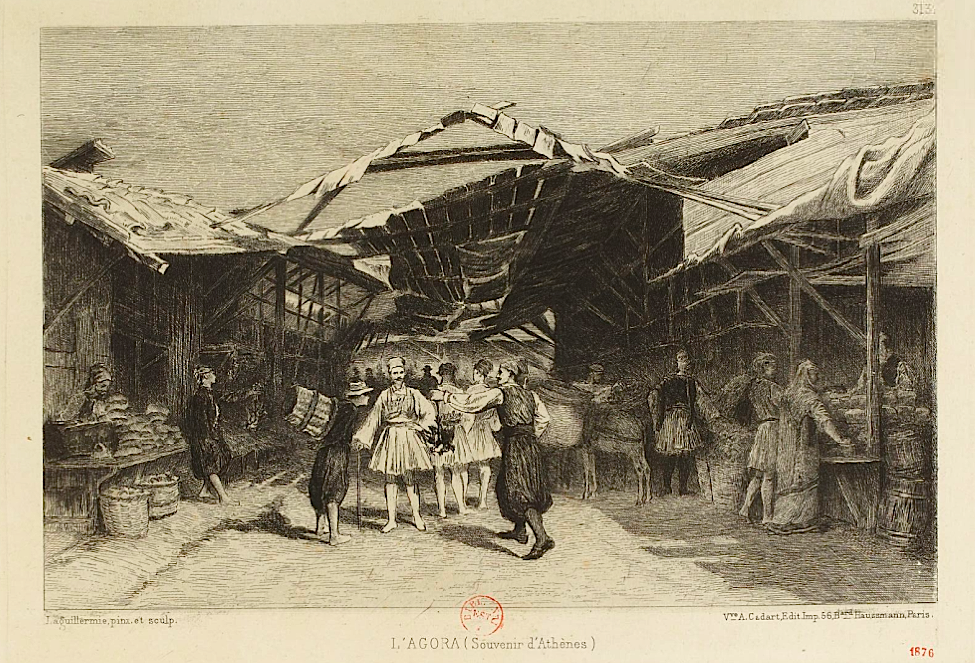
The Agora (marketplace), from L'Illustration nouvelle, published by Cadart

In 1862, he became one of the first members of the original Société des aquafortistes, founded by Alfred Cadart, who published several of his early plates. His first exhibit at the Salon came in 1863. He won the Prix de Rome in 1866, for his intaglio work, and spent four years at the Villa Medici. In 1869, he made a visit to Spain to copy the masterworks of Diego Vélazquez.

Not long after his return to France, the Franco-Prussian War began. During the Siege of Paris, he attempted to enlist. Later, during the Commune, he was able to remain in Paris by taking refuge in the studios of his teacher, Bouguereau, who had fled to La Rochelle.

In 1883, he was named a Knight in the Legion of Honor. Two years later, he was the founder of a new "Société des aquafortistes français", which came under the artistic direction of Flameng. Its governing committee included publishers such as Henri Floury, Alphonse Lemerre and Pierre-Jules Hetzel.

He was awarded a silver medal at the Exposition Universelle of 1889, and a Grand Prize at the Exposition of 1900. During that same period, he was named a professor of engraving at the École des Beaux-Arts. Many of his students became well known; notably Jules-René Bouffanais, Robert Cami, Jean Dries, Paul Lemagny, and Adrien Ouvrier. In 1911, he was elected to the Académie des Beaux-Arts, where he took Seat #4, succeeding Oscar Roty (deceased).

In addition to his reproductions, he provided illustrations for works by Arsène Houssaye, Bernardin de Saint-Pierre, and Benvenuto Cellini, as well as frontispieces for volumes of the Almanach des spectacles; issued by the Librairie des bibliophiles from 1902 to 1913.

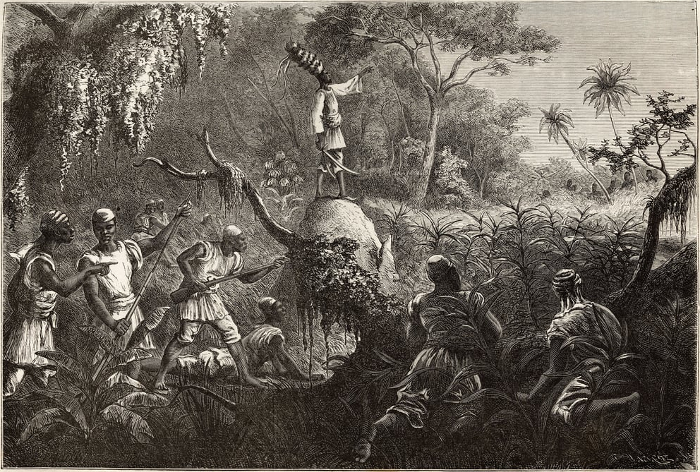
Abd-es-Samate of the Mombuttu, challenging the Zande; illustration from The Heart of Africa, by Georg August Schweinfurth
