= Victor Levasseur (cartographer) =

19th-century French cartographer

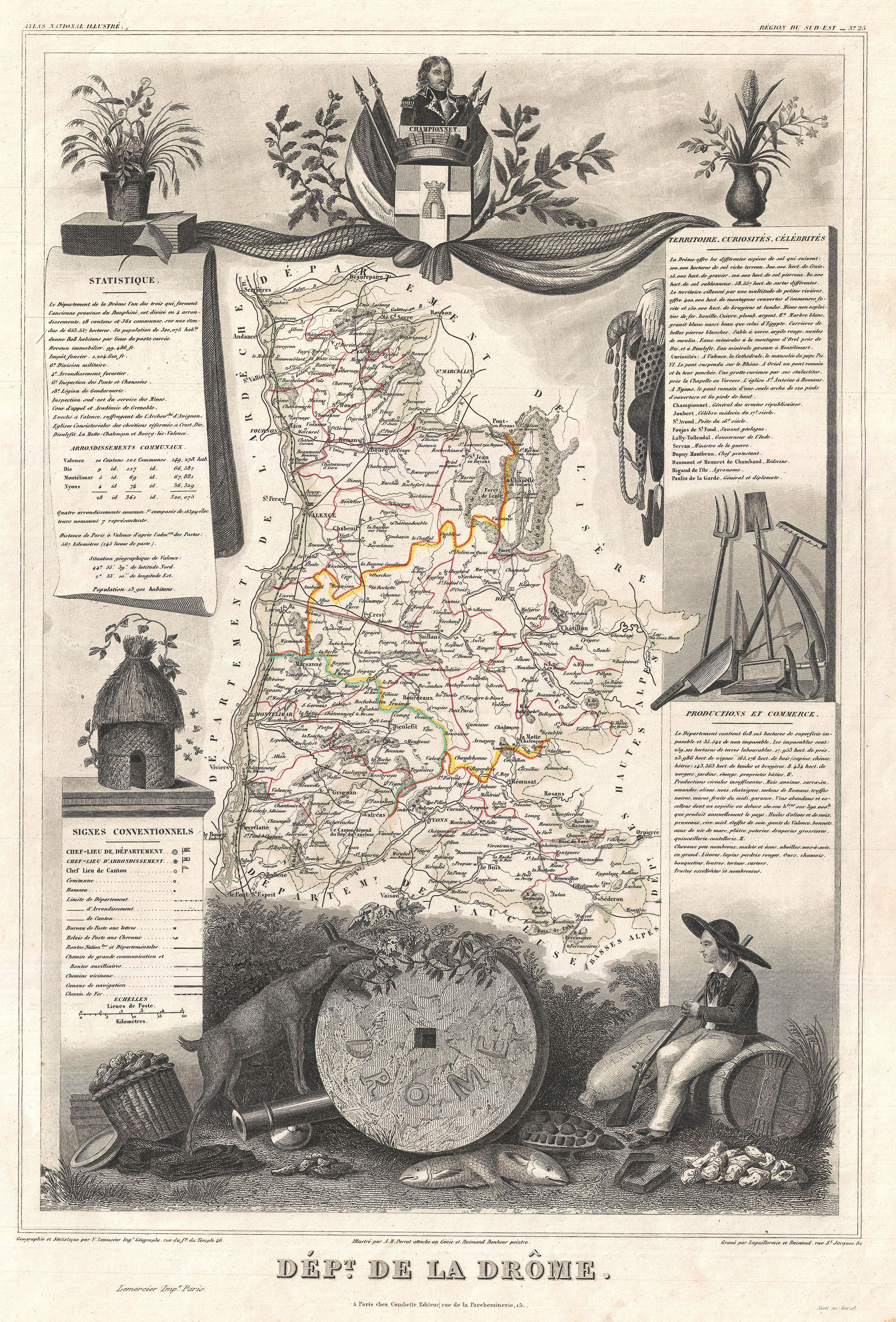
- evasseur Map of the Drôme department
- Born: 1795
- Died: 1862 (aged 66–67)
- Occupation: cartographer
- Notable work: Atlas Nationale illustré des 86 Départements et des Possessions de la France

Victor Jules Levasseur (1795–1862) was a French cartographer widely known for his distinctive decorative style. He produced numerous maps more admired for the artistic content of the scenes and data surrounding the map than for the detail of the map.
