= Picciola =

1836 novel by Joseph-Xavier Boniface

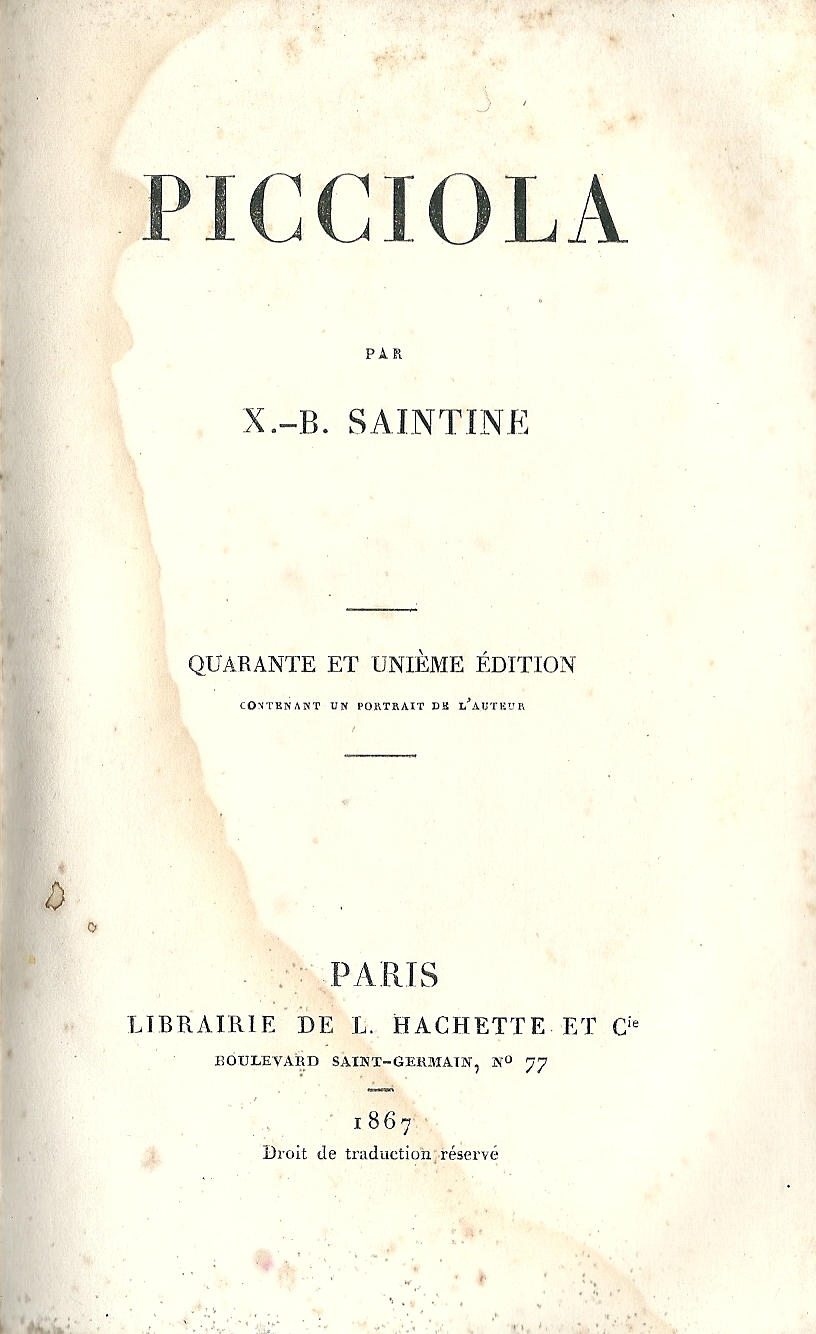
Cover page of the 41st edition in 1867.

Picciola is a novel published in 1836 by Joseph-Xavier Boniface.

== Story ==
The book tells the story of Count Charney, a former soldier who lost his trust in man and has been jailed for conspiring against Napoleon. Charney one day discovers a plant growing between two paving stones of his cell. This plant becomes for him a distraction, then an obsession, then a passion and finally it becomes a symbol of life and love. Through the physiological development of the plant he calls Picciola he learns to love and appreciate beauty through this real example of the evolution of nature. The image of a small flower that grows and survives with the care provided by Charney in a place so sinister as a prison, is an image of the force of nature and persistence. Charney follows the example of the flower and seeks to enrich his mind and soul amidst the walls that imprison him.

== Characters ==
- Count Charles Véramont de Charney
- Ludovic, the jailer
- Girhardi, another prisoner
- Teresa, Girhardi's daughter
- Picciola, the flower
- Napoléon 1er
- Joséphine

Other media

- Robert Braithwaite Martineau
