= X. B. Saintine =

French dramatist and novelist (1798–1865)

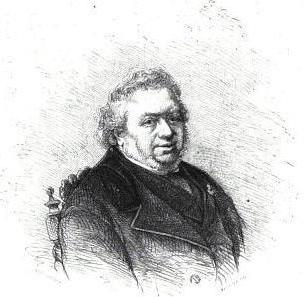
- Wood engraving of Saintine
- Born: Joseph Xavier Boniface; 10 July 1798; Paris, France
- Died: 21 January 1865 (aged 66); Paris, France
- Occupations: Playwright, novelist

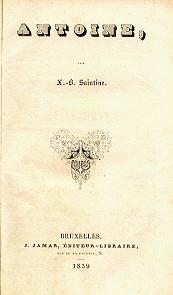
Cover of Antoine, 1839

Xavier Boniface Saintine (10 July 1798 – 21 January 1865) was a French dramatist and novelist.

== Biography ==
He was born Joseph Xavier Boniface in Paris in 1798. In 1823, he produced a volume of poetry in the manner of the Romanticists, entitled Poèmes, odes, épîtres. In 1836, he wrote Picciola, a novel about the Count de Charney, a political prisoner in Piedmont, whose reason was saved by his cultivation of a tiny flower growing between the paving stones of his prison yard. This story is a masterpiece of the sentimental kind, and was translated into many European languages. The novel earned him renown and came to be regarded as a classic of French literature.

He produced many other novels, and was a dramatist. He collaborated in more than 200 pieces with Eugène Scribe and others, usually under the name of Xavier. He co-wrote the story which was to form the basis for Bellini's opera I puritani. He died in Paris in 1865.

== Works ==
Saintine wrote more than 200 theatre plays and novels under the pen names Saintine, X.B. Saintine, Joseph Xavier Saintine, Xavier.

=== Books ===
- Poëmes, odes, épitres. (1823)
- Jonathan le Visionnaire, contes philosophiques et moraux. (1825)
- Histoire des Guerres d'Italie, Campagne des Alpes. (1826)
- Histoire de la Civilisation antédiluvienne. (1830)
- Le Mutilé. (1832)
- Une Maîtresse de Louis XIII. in 2 volumes (1834)
- Picciola. (1836)
- Les Soirées de Jonathan, in 2 volumes (1837)
- Antoine, l'ami de Robespierre.(1839)
- Les Récits dans la Tourelle : Un Rossignol pris au Trébuchet, etc. (1844)
- Les Métamorphoses de la Femme. (1846)
- Les trois Reines. (1853)
- Seul ! (1857)
- Chrisna. (1860)
- Trois ans en Judée. (1860)
- La belle Cordière et ses trois amoureux. (1861)
- Le Chemin des écoliers (1861) including an illustrated edition with 450 vignettes by Gustave Doré, grand in-8, broché.
- Contes de toutes les couleurs : Léonard le cocher, etc. (1862)
- La Mythologie du Rhin; (1862) including an edition illustrated by Gustave Doré, grand in-8, broché.
- La Mère Gigogne et ses trois filles : La nature et ses trois règnes; causeries et contes d'un bon papa sur l'histoire naturelle et les objets les plus usuels (1863), grand in-8, illustrated with 171 vignettes by Foulquier and Faguet, broché.
- La Seconde Vie. (1864)

=== Theater plays ===
- 1833 (25 September): Têtes Rondes et Cavaliers, with Jacques-François Ancelot, Théâtre du Vaudeville; it also formed the basis for the libretto of the 1835 opera I Puritani, by Vincenzo Bellini
- 1834: Le Mari de la favorite, five-act comedy, with Michel Masson, Théâtre de la Porte-Saint-Martin
- 1836: Madame Favart, with Michel Masson, Théâtre du Palais Royal
- 1841: Mademoiselle Sallé with Jean-François Bayard and Dumanoir, Théâtre du Palais Royal
