= Septeuil =

- Commune
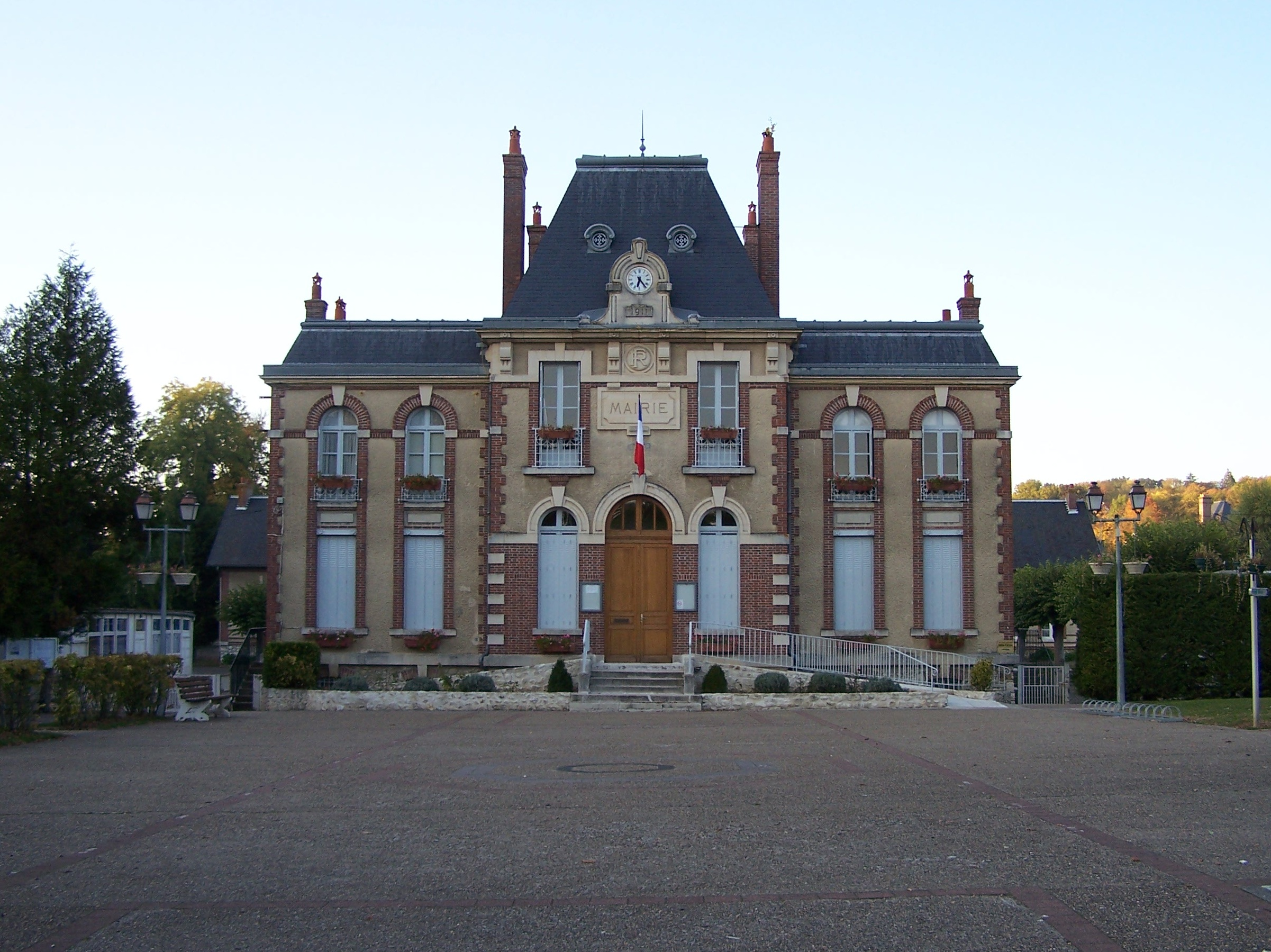
- Location of Septeuil
- Location within France Location within Île-de-France (region)
- Coordinates: 48°53′36″N 1°40′56″E
- Country: France
- Region: Île-de-France
- Department: Yvelines
- Arrondissement: Mantes-la-Jolie
- Canton: Bonnières-sur-Seine
- Intercommunality: Pays houdanais

Government
  - Mayor (2020–2026): Dominique Riviere
- Area^{1}: 9.40 km^{2} (3.63 sq mi)
- Elevation: 70 m (230 ft)
- Highest elevation: 165 m (541 ft)
- Lowest elevation: 52 m (171 ft)
- Population (2023): 2,264
  - Density: 241/km^{2} (624/sq mi)
- Time zone: UTC+01:00 (CET)
  - Summer (DST): UTC+02:00 (CEST)
- INSEE/Postal code: 78591 /78790
- Website: http://www.mairie-septeuil.fr/
- ^{1} French Land Register data, which excludes lakes, ponds, glaciers > 1 km^{2} (0.386 sq mi or 247 acres) and river estuaries.

Septeuil (French pronunciation: [sɛptœj]) is a commune in the Yvelines department in the Île-de-France region in north-central France.

== River ==
Septeuil is traversed by a small river, la Flexanville. This waterway flows through eight other communes for a total distance of 11.1 kilometres (6.9 mi). The Flexanville is a tributary of the Vaucouleurs which in turn empties into the Seine.

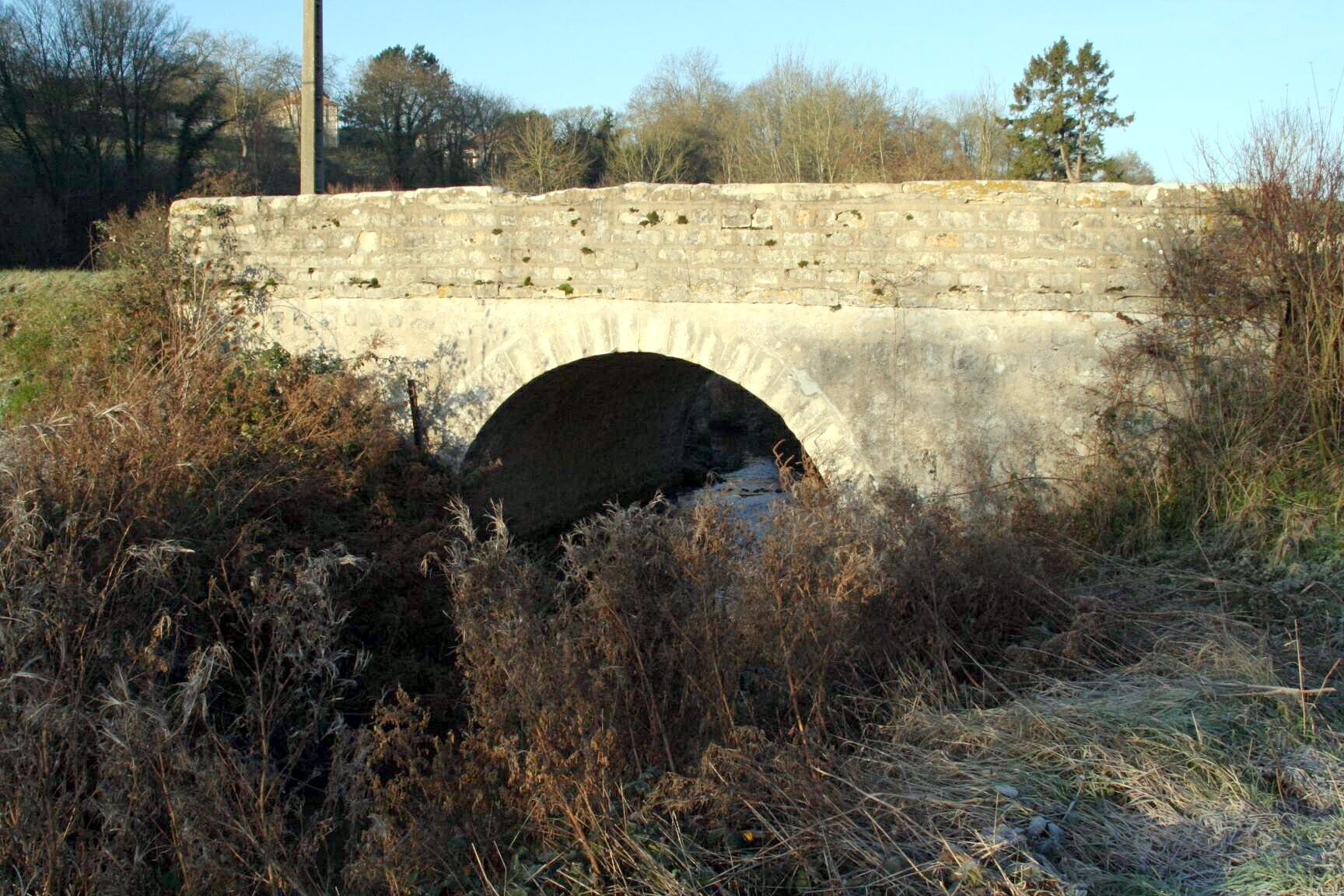
Bridge over la Flexanville

== Population ==
Historical population
Year	Pop.	±% p.a.
1968	1,135	—
1975	1,543	+4.48%
1982	1,813	+2.33%
1990	1,945	+0.88%
1999	2,046	+0.56%
2007	2,083	+0.22%
2012	2,302	+2.02%
2017	2,348	+0.40%
2023	2,264	−0.61%
Source: INSEE

== See also ==
- Communes of the Yvelines department
