= Courgent =

- Commune
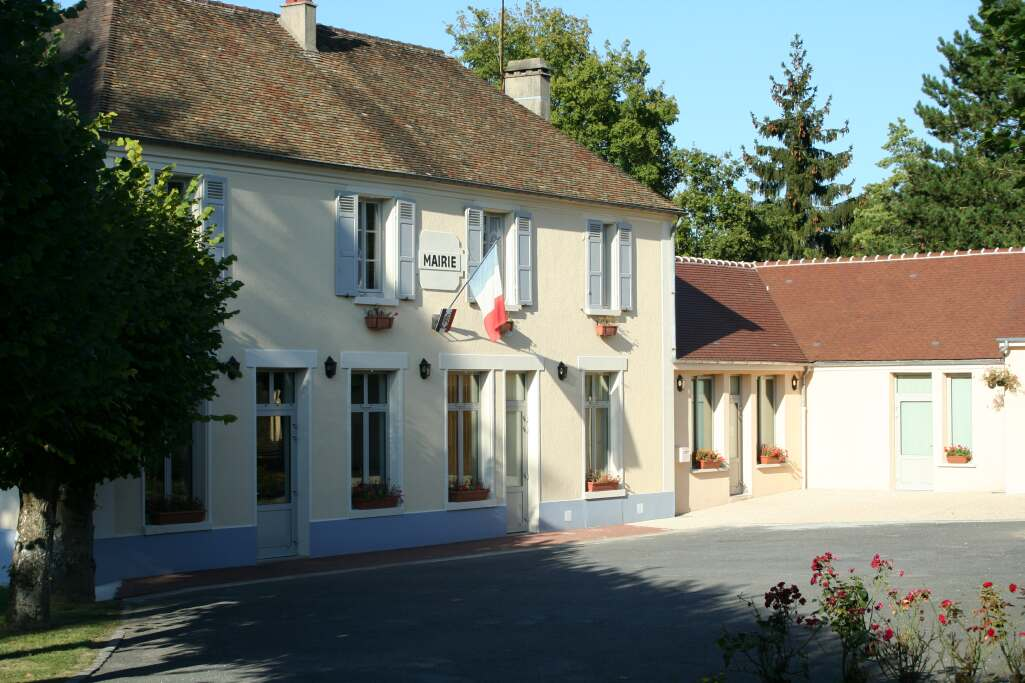
- Town hall
- Location of Courgent
- Location within France Location within Île-de-France (region)
- Coordinates: 48°53′36″N 1°39′37″E
- Country: France
- Region: Île-de-France
- Department: Yvelines
- Arrondissement: Mantes-la-Jolie
- Canton: Bonnières-sur-Seine
- Intercommunality: Pays Houdanais

Government
  - Mayor (2025–2026): Dominique Lhoste
- Area^{1}: 2.02 km^{2} (0.78 sq mi)
- Elevation: 100 m (330 ft)
- Highest elevation: 119 m (390 ft)
- Lowest elevation: 57 m (187 ft)
- Population (2023): 414
  - Density: 205/km^{2} (531/sq mi)
- Time zone: UTC+01:00 (CET)
  - Summer (DST): UTC+02:00 (CEST)
- INSEE/Postal code: 78185 /78790
- ^{1} French Land Register data, which excludes lakes, ponds, glaciers > 1 km^{2} (0.386 sq mi or 247 acres) and river estuaries.

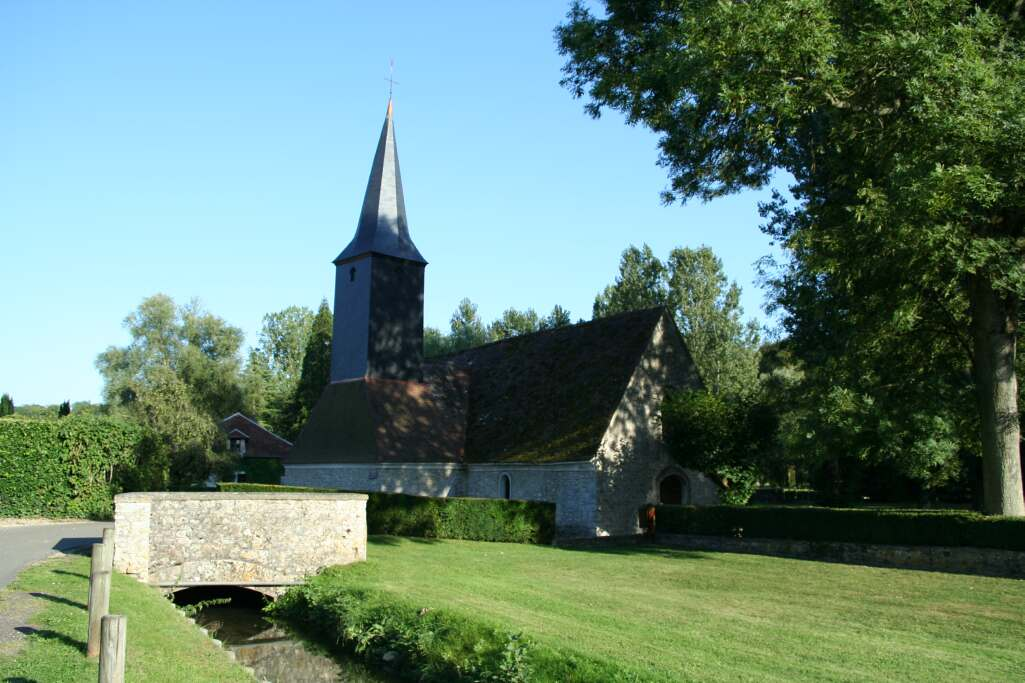
Sainte-Clotilde

Courgent (French pronunciation: [kuʁʒɑ̃]) is a commune in the Yvelines department in the Île-de-France region in north-central France.

== See also ==
- Communes of the Yvelines department
