= Verdier =

Verdier is a French surname. Notable people with the surname include:

- Amélie Verdier (born 1979), French civil servant
- Arthur Verdier (1835–1898), French mariner, shipowner, merchant and pioneer
- Fabienne Verdier (born 1962), French painter
- Guillaume Verdier, French naval architect
- Henri Verdier, French Ambassador for digital affairs
- Jean Verdier (1864–1940), French Cardinal of the Roman Catholic Church
- Jean-Antoine Verdier (1767–1839), French general
- Jean-Louis Verdier, mathematician, inventor of Verdier duality
- Jerome Verdier, Liberian human rights activist
- Julien Verdier (1910–1999), French actor
- Justine Verdier, French pianist
- Nicolas Verdier, French footballer
- Paul A. Verdier (died 1996), licensed psychologist in California
- Suzanne Verdier (1745–1813), French writer
- Victor Verdier (1803–1878), French horticulturist and rose breeder

== See also ==
- Éditions Verdier, a French publishing company
