= Aurélien Rousseau =

French civil servant and politician (born 1976)

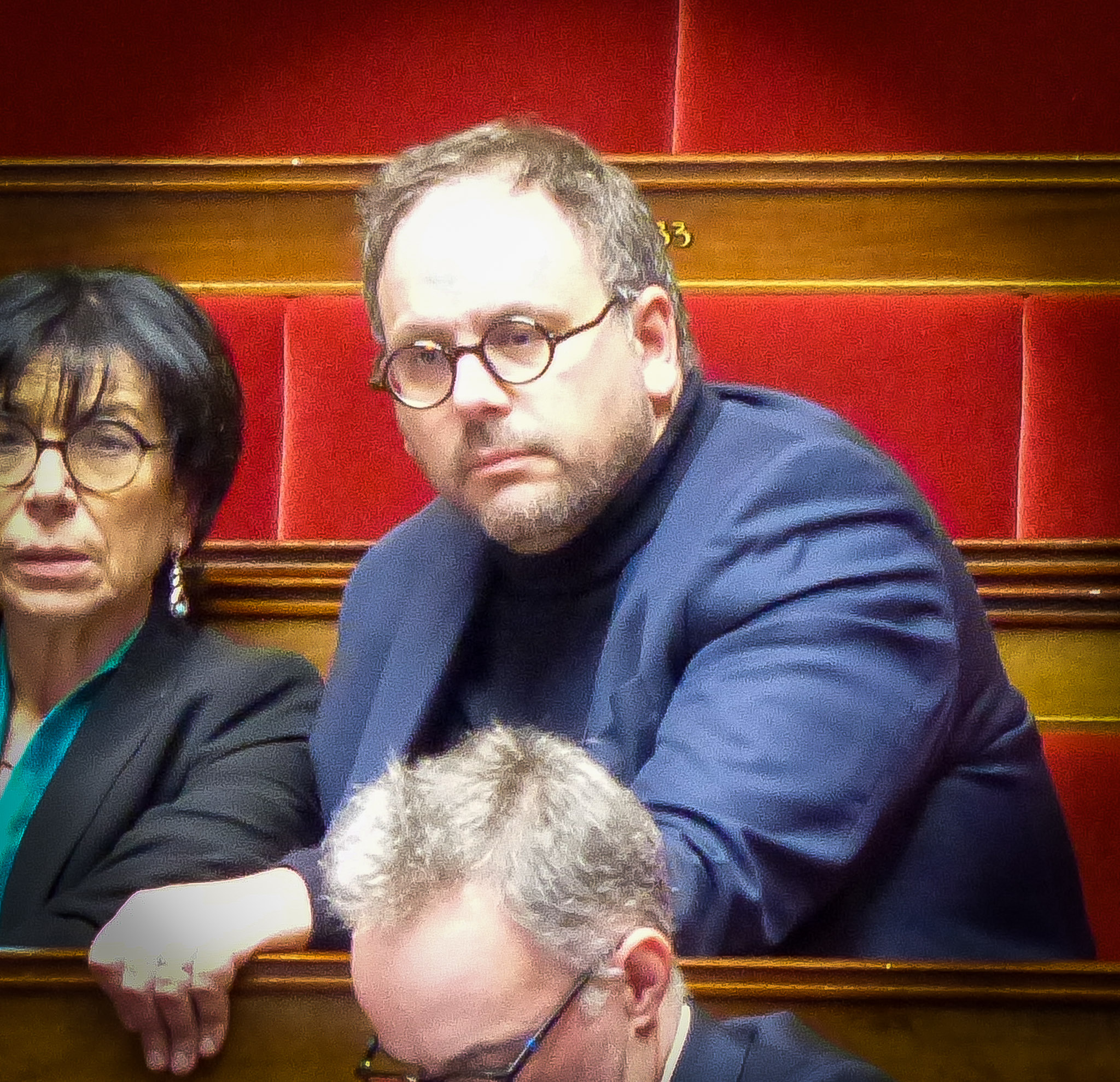

Member of the National Assembly for Yvelines's 7th constituency
- Incumbent
- Assumed office 8 July 2024
- Preceded by: Nadia Hai

Minister of Health and Prevention
- In office 20 July 2023 – 20 December 2023
- Prime Minister: Élisabeth Borne
- Preceded by: François Braun
- Succeeded by: Agnès Firmin-Le Bodo

Chief of Staff of Prime Minister of France
- In office 17 May 2022 – 17 July 2023
- Prime Minister: Élisabeth Borne
- Preceded by: Nicolas Revel
- Succeeded by: Jean-Denis Combrexelle

Director of the Regional Agency for Health of Île-de-France
- In office 3 September 2018 – 9 August 2021
- Preceded by: Christophe Devys
- Succeeded by: Amélie Verdier

Chief Executive of Monnaie de Paris
- In office 18 April 2017 – 27 November 2018
- Preceded by: Christophe Beaux
- Succeeded by: Marc Schwartz

Personal details
- Born: 25 June 1976 (age 50) Alès, France
- Party: Place Publique (2024–present)
- Other political affiliations: PCF (2000–2009); PS (2010–2017); LREM/RE (2017–2023)
- Spouse: Marguerite Cazeneuve (m. 2021)
- Children: 3
- Relatives: Jean-René Cazeneuve (father-in-law); Pierre Cazeneuve (brother-in-law)
- Education: École nationale d'administration

Aurélien Rousseau (French pronunciation: [oʁeljɛ̃ ʁuso]; born 25 June 1976) is a French civil servant and politician who served as Minister of Health and Prevention in the government of Prime Minister Élisabeth Borne from July to December 2023. A member of Place Publique (PP), he has represented the 7th constituency of Yvelines in the National Assembly since July 2024.

From May 2022 to July 2023, Rousseau served as Borne's chief of staff; he resigned from that position effective on 17 July 2023. On 20 December 2023, he resigned as Health Minister in response to the passage of a controversial immigration bill backed by his government.

== Early life and education ==
Rousseau grew up in Saint-Hilaire-de-Brethmas, Gard.

== Career ==
In 1999, Rousseau began his career as history and geography teacher at a lycée in Seine-Saint-Denis.

From 2015 to 2017, Rousseau served as deputy director of the cabinet and advisor on social affairs to successive Prime Ministers Manuel Valls and Bernard Cazeneuve.

From 2017 to 2018, Rousseau served as director of Monnaie de Paris.

Rousseau won plaudits for running the public health authority in the Paris region during the COVID-19 pandemic in France.

=== Minister of Health, July–December 2023 ===
In October 2023, Rousseau participated in the first joint cabinet retreat of the German and French governments in Hamburg, chaired by Chancellor Olaf Scholz and President Emmanuel Macron.

=== 2024 legislative election ===
In the 2024 French legislative election, he stood under the label of Place Publique as a candidate of the New Popular Front in Yvelines's 7th constituency, winning the seat from Renaissance's Nadia Hai. In an interview with L'Express, he said he was stunned even more by Macron's denunciations of the New Popular Front's program than by the threat of the far-right, arguing that the president's statements were sowing the seeds for the success of the National Rally by giving it "ideological legitimacy" due to his relativisation of the united left and far-right. Rousseau also reaffirmed that he would support all "republican candidates" opposed to the RN in the second round.

== Personal life ==
Rousseau is married to Marguerite Cazeneuve. In 2020, the couple's son was born.
