= Baumel =

Baumel is a surname. Notable people with the surname include:

- Jacques Baumel (1918–2006), French politician
- Jean-Marie Baumel (1912–1978), French sculptor
- Judith Baumel (born 1956), American poet
- Larry Baumel (1944–2023), American racing driver
- Laurent Baumel (born 1965), French politician
- Shane Baumel (born 1997), American actor
- Zechariah Baumel (1960–1982), American–Israeli soldier in the Israel Defense Forces
