= Reactions to the 2005 French riots =

The 2005 French riots led to a domestic and international response.

== Domestic ==
=== Political ===
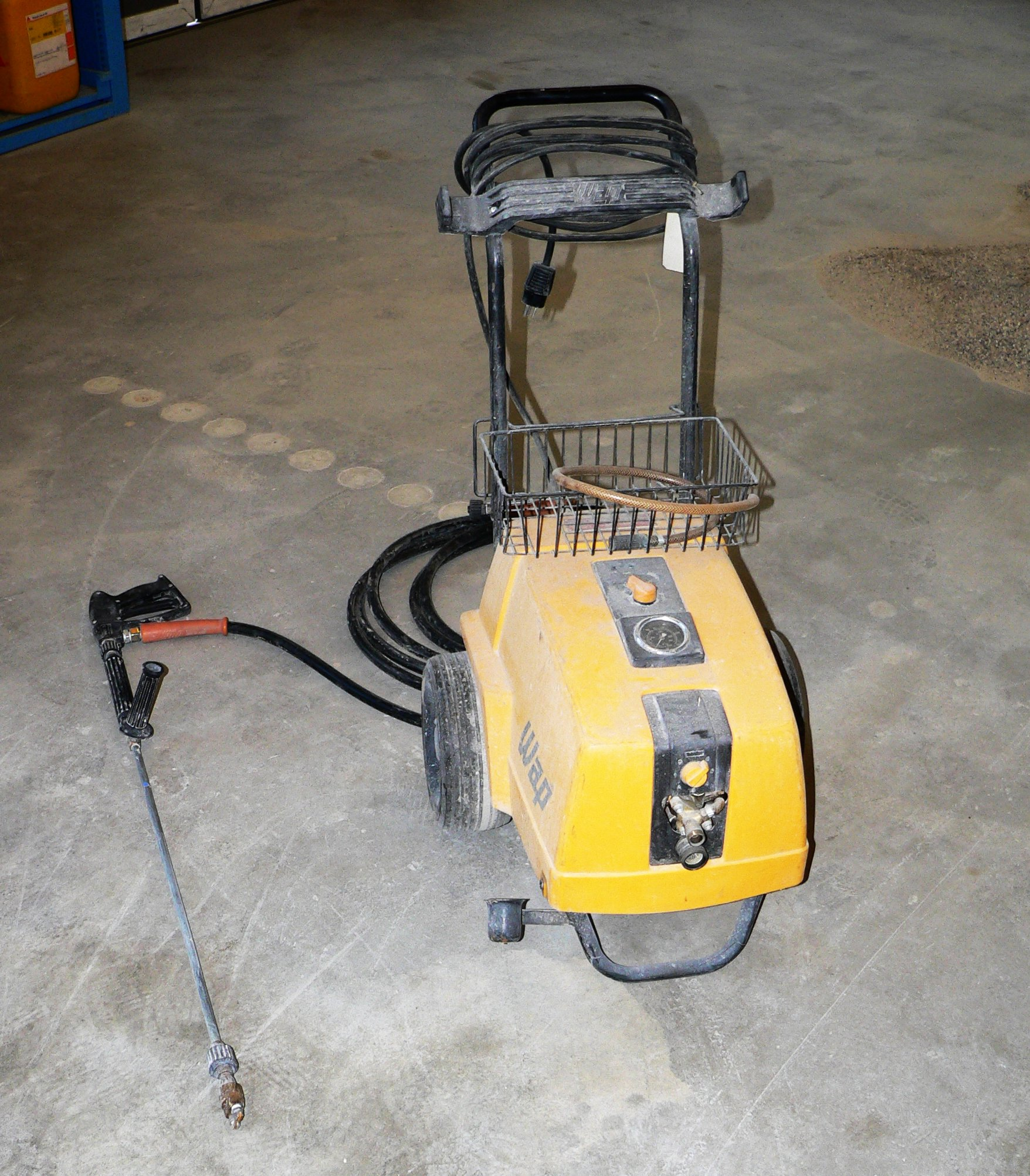
Nicolas Sarkozy suggested cleaning out the banlieues with a Kärcher (Kärcher is a well-known brand of high pressure water cleaners)

Interior Minister Nicolas Sarkozy, who has consistently advocated a tough approach to crime and restoring law and order, was a major probable contender for the 2007 presidential election. Success or failure on his part in quelling violence in suburban ghettos may thus have had far-ranging implications. Any action by Sarkozy was likely to be attacked by the political opposition, as well as by members of his Union for a Popular Movement (UMP) political coalition who also expect to run for the presidency. Le Monde, in a 5 November editorial reminisced about the "catastrophic" elections of 2002 where right-wing candidate Jean-Marie Le Pen managed to enter the second round of voting, showing concern that a similar situation might arise in the upcoming elections as a backlash to the riots.

After the fourth night of riots, Sarkozy declared a zero tolerance policy towards urban violence and announced that 17 companies of riot police (C.R.S.) and 7 mobile police squadrons (escadrons de gendarmerie mobile) would be stationed in contentious Paris neighborhoods. Sarkozy has said that he believes that some of the violence may be at the instigation of organized gangs. "... All of this doesn't appear to us to be completely spontaneous", he said. Undercover police officers were sent to identify "gang leaders, drug traffickers and big shots." Sarkozy's approach was criticized by left-wing politicians who called for greater public funding for housing, education, and job creation, and refraining from "dangerous demagoguery". Sarkozy was further criticized after he referred to the rioters as racaille and voyous (translating to "scum", "riff-raff", "thugs" or "hoodlums"). During his visit to Clichy-sous-Bois, the Interior Minister was to meet with the families of the two youths killed, but when a tear gas grenade was thrown into the Clichy mosque, the families pulled out of the meeting. Bouna Traoré's brother Siyakah said, "There is no way we're going to see Sarkozy, who is incompetent. What happened in the mosque is really disrespectful." The families finally met Prime minister Dominique de Villepin on 3 November.

The left-wing newspaper Libération cited the exasperation of suburb youth at the harassment by the police and Interior Minister Sarkozy ("lack of respect"). The declaration of a pupil's parent that "Torching a school is unacceptable, but the one who put on the fire is Sarkozy" was reported throughout the French press, including in the conservative newspaper Le Figaro.

Azouz Begag, delegate minister for the promotion of equal opportunity, made several declarations about the recent unrest, opposing himself to Interior minister Nicolas Sarkozy for the latter's use of "imprecise, warlike semantics", which he says cannot help bring back calm in the affected areas.

On November 5, Paris (right-wing) prosecutor Yves Bot told Europe 1 radio that "This is done in a way that gives every appearance of being coordinated." Some Aulnay-sous-Bois residents, as reported by Reuters, suspect that the riots were linked to the drug trade or even coordination by Islamic fundamentalists. Meanwhile, other Aulnay-sous-Bois residents interviewed considered this unjustified. Jérémie Garrigues, 19, doubted this was the case. "If those kids had been organized, they would have done much worse -- they would have used guns and bombs against the town hall and the prefecture", he argued. "Those are all politicians' theories", remarked an Algerian woman named Samia, whose main concern was how frightened her children were by the unrest. "We live here in reality." International News Article | Reuters.com Jean-Marie Huet, director of criminal affairs and graces, after visiting an artisanal factory of molotov cocktails, said that "this is not really spontaneous trouble anymore"; he further stated "Correlations are made and situations are compared. No one has yet established that there should be any sort of underground organisation".

Muslim leaders of African and Arab communities in France have also issued a fatwa, or religious order, against the riots, without many effects. "It is strictly forbidden for any Muslim... to take part in any action that strikes blindly at private or public property or that could threaten the lives of others", said the fatwa by the controversial Union of Islamic Organisations of France (UIOF), favored by Nicolas Sarkozy.

The BBC reports that French society's negative perceptions of Islam and of immigrants have alienated some French Muslims and may have been a factor in the causes of the riots; "Islam is seen as the biggest challenge to the country's secular model in the past 100 years". The BBC questioned whether such alarm is justified, citing that France's Muslim ghettos are not hotbeds of separatism and that "the suburbs are full of people desperate to integrate into the wider society."

Upon his nomination as interior minister, populist hardliner Nicolas Sarkozy promised to lead both a strict policy of zero tolerance against underground crime, promote law and order, and to promote social integration of the rejected. His actions are often criticised because of his use of television and the media. This, along with the relaxing of rules allowing the deportation of foreign offenders, and his declarations of support for positive discrimination and the participation of legal immigrants in local elections, has angered some suburban residents. However, Nicolas Sarkozy was the one to propose to expel all foreigners involved in the riots, which amounted to reinstate the "double penalty", a decision which has been widely criticized, for example by NGO SOS Racisme.

On Wednesday, October 19, Sarkozy announced a crackdown on urban violence and black marketeers, ordering specially trained police to tackle 25 neighbourhoods across the country. Sarkozy went there and declared he wanted to "clean out the city with a Kärcher" (nettoyer la cité au Kärcher). On October 25, as he went to Argenteuil, Nicolas Sarkozy used the word "racaille" ("trash"). Certain people say that inhabitants of these neighbourhoods felt insulted, feeling that all the inhabitants were considered offenders and criminals. Stones and bottles were tossed at him.

Jean-Marie Le Pen, a hardliner right-wing politician and a longtime critic of immigration from poorer countries, declared that the events vindicated what he had long said. He regretted the caution of the government in not sending law enforcement forces straight against the rioters. Another hardliner right-winger, Philippe de Villiers, made similar criticism.

UMP politician Bernard Accoyer called polygamy in France "certainly one of the causes, though not the only one" for the riots. Pierre Cardo of the UMP stated that "products of polygamous families" were among the participants. Historian Hélène Carrère d'Encausse of the Académie française stated that "African children [were] in the streets and not at school" because "in an apartment, there are three or four wives and 25 children". MRAP criticized such statements, stating that they were "playing an extremely dangerous role in feeding our country with the racism that causes the damage we know".

=== State of emergency ===
On 8 November, President Jacques Chirac declared a state of emergency using a 1955 law. On 16 November, the French parliament, dominated by Nicolas Sarkozy's UMP (right-wing) party, approved a three-month extension of the state of emergency, which was to end on 21 February 2006. On 17 November, the French police declared a return to a normal situation throughout France, saying that the 98 vehicles torched the previous night corresponded to the usual average. On December 10, France's highest administrative body, the Council of State, ruled that the three-month state of emergency decreed to guarantee calm following unrest was legal. It rejected a complaint from 74 law professors (led by Frédéric Rolin) and the Green party, declaring that the conditions that led to the unrest, the quick spread of violence and the possibility that it could recur justify the state of emergency. The Council of State argued that "each night, between 40 to 60 cars are torched, and {that} we have to be cautious with New Year's Eve approaching". The complaint challenged the state of emergency's necessity, and said it compromised fundamental liberties.

Left-wing organizations, including SOS Racisme, the CIMADE, Syndicat de la Magistrature (magistrate trade-union), have criticized the "state of emergency" and the expulsions of foreigners born in France who didn't have a chance to demand French nationality (even though they are full-time residents). According to the accounts of some police trade-unions, the "state of emergency" wasn't really useful, with the situation seeming to become calmer without having to activate the possibilities allowed by the proclamation of the state of emergency.

=== Police ===
An official of Action Police CFTC, an "ultra-minority" police trade union, described the riots as a "civil war", and called on the French Army to intervene. This caused outrage, notably triggering responses from the UNSA-Police union, which represents the majority of riot police (CRS), describing the situation in less dramatic terms. In response to the riots, Sarkozy stated that police officers should be armed with non-lethal weapons to combat urban violence. Other voices in the public sphere have encouraged the use of deadly force as offering a more permanent solution to the problem of rioters. The French government, even prior to these riots, has been equipping law enforcement forces with less-lethal weapons (such as "flash-balls" and Tasers) to better deal with petty delinquency and urban unrest, especially in poor suburban communities. Amnesty International, among others, has criticized the use of these "less-lethal" weapons.

French national police spokesman, Patrick Hamon, was quoted in the Wall Street Journal as saying that there appeared to be no coordination among gangs in different areas. But he said youths in individual neighborhoods were communicating by cellphone text messages or email — arranging meetings and warning each other about police operations. According to the Guardian, (November 6, 2005), Hamon said, "what we notice is that the bands of youths are, little by little, getting more organized, arranging attacks through cell phone text messages and learning how to make gasoline bombs." The police have found a gasoline bomb-making workshop in a derelict building; Justice Ministry official Jean-Marie Huet told The Associated Press that gasoline bombs "are not being improvised by kids in their bathrooms." The apparent role of the Internet in helping to coordinate and cause unrest was also noted. It is generally noted, though, that making a Molotov cocktail does not need any special skill.

=== Firefighters ===
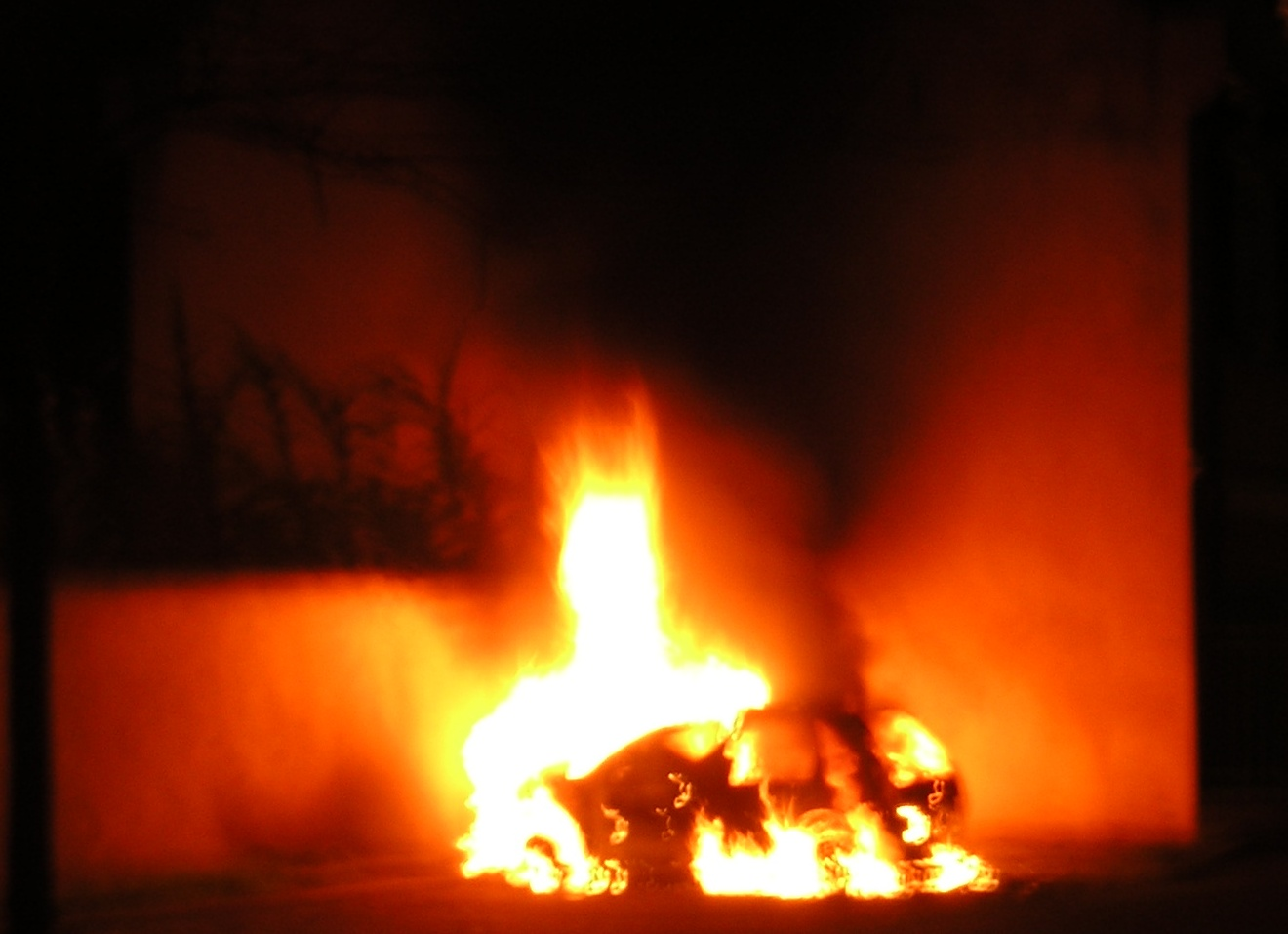
A car burns in Strasbourg, France on the night of November 5 as riots spread from the Paris banlieues to other parts of the country.

The Paris Fire Brigade developed an "Urban Violence Plan", inspired by the experience of firefighters in Northern Ireland (Libération, Oct. 29). The "hot zone" is identified and the fire engines wait outside this zone. When a fire is reported, a minimal team is engaged (two men outside the fire engine) under cover of the police forces; when the fire does not show any risk of spreading or causing casualties, the firefighters withdraw without attempting to put it out. While in the zone, firefighters stay alert for projectiles. The layout of the area is taken into account so that firefighters may not be trapped in a dead end.

During the current event, fire engines and firefighters from other départements were called for reinforcement; they were placed to defend calm areas (i.e. Paris intra muros), whereas the Paris Fire Brigade, which is a military unit, dealt with the hot zones.

A few firefighters were injured by broken glass or Molotov cocktails, while there are reports of an attack using fine pellet air guns.

=== Media coverage ===
Jean-Claude Dassier, News director general at TF1 who is one of France's leading TV news executives has admitted self censoring the coverage of the riots in the country for fear of encouraging support for far-right politicians while public television station France 3 has stopped reporting the numbers of torched cars town by town. Media have generally agreed to give only a total national number of torched cars. French TV boss admits censoring riot coverage French journalists have reported that some American TV shows and politicians (i.e. members of the Republican Party) exaggerated the riots (i.e. Fox News) for making a connection between the Islamic terrorist group Al-Qaeda and the rioters.

== International ==
- Australia -The Prime Minister, Mr John Howard linked the riots in Paris with the French industrial relations (IR) system to justify his new IR legislation. "I do point out that one of the reasons for a feeling of alienation and disadvantage is the persistence of high levels of unemployment in this country against a background of other European economies with less regulated labour markets", he said.
- Germany - "We also have youth violence problems in Germany, but we haven't experienced cases of the dimensions of the blind violence that's taking place in France at the moment", said Norbert Seitz, director of the German Forum for Crime Prevention, a private information center. Wolfgang Schäuble, a conservative member of the Bundestagslated to be Germany's interior minister, concurred. "The conditions in France are different from the ones we have", he said. "We don't have these gigantic high-rise projects that they have on the edges of French cities." Mr. Schäuble added, however, that Germany needed to "improve integration, especially of young people", if violence is to be avoided.
- Iran - The Iranian minister of foreign affairs demanded that France treat its minorities with respect and protect their human rights.
- Italy - Opposition leader Romano Prodi called on the Italian government to take urgent action, telling reporters: "We have the worst suburbs in Europe. I don't think things are so different from Paris. It's only a matter of time."
- Libya - The leader of Libya, Muammar al-Gaddafi spoke with French President Jacques Chirac by telephone and offered to help with the situation.
- Russia - Leader of the Liberal Democratic Party of Russia Vladimir Zhirinovsky claims the riots were sparked by the American CIA to "weaken Europe".
- Senegal - The Senegalese president, Abdoulaye Wade, at the time on a visit to Paris, reacted to the events by declaring that France must "dissolve the ghettos, and integrate all Africans asking to be integrated."
- Sweden - Swedish Prime Minister Göran Persson criticised France's response to the violence, saying emergency powers would not help to resolve the problems.
- Turkey - The Turkish prime minister named the French prohibition of headscarves in schools to be one of the reasons for the upsurge of violence in the banlieues. He stated this in an interview with the Turkish newspaper Milliyet. Turkey has similar laws. When the French Prime Minister de Villepin was queried about Erdoğan's statement, he replied "C'est sans rapport", meaning "It is not related."
- United States - State Department spokesman Sean McCormack, asked to comment directly on the riots, said it was a French internal issue, and added, "certainly, as anybody would, we mourn the loss of life in these kinds of situations. But, again, these are issues for the French people and the French government to address."

=== Travel warnings ===
Travel warnings for France were issued, for citizens of their respective countries, by the governments of:

- as of 3 November: Russia
- as of 7 November: Australia, Austria, Belgium, Canada, Czech Republic, Denmark, Finland, Germany, Hong Kong, Hungary, Japan, Netherlands, People's Republic of China, Slovakia, United Kingdom, United States.

== Notes ==
1. "Scotsman" on renewal of state of emergency
2. Indymedia on renewal of state of emergency, #torched cars
3. "Each night between 40 and 60 cars are torched" according to the Council of State in "Le Canard enchaîné #4442, 14 December 2005.
4. Renewal of state of emergency (article from Le Monde)
