= Araf =

Araf can refer to:

- ARAF, a gene
- "Araf", a Welsh word meaning "slow".
- Autorité de Régulation des Activités Ferroviaires, a regulatory body in France
- Araf (film)
- The All-Russia Athletic Federation
- Al-A'raf (realm of afterlife), the Muslim sheol or borderland between heaven and hell for those who are, from incapacity, neither morally bad nor morally good
- Al-A'raf (surah) 7th chapter (sūrah) of the Qur'an
