= Fournel =

Fournel is a surname. Notable people with the surname include:

- Amelia Fournel (born 1977), Argentine sport shooter
- Émilie Fournel (born 1986), Canadian canoeist
- Hugues Fournel (born 1988), Canadian canoeist
- Jean Fournel (1956–1997), Canadian canoeist
- Jean-François Fournel (1745–1820), French lawyer
- Jérôme Fournel (born 1967), French civil servant
- Paul Fournel (born 1947), French writer
