= Racaille =

Racaille is an Old French term meaning outcast or rabble, and may refer to:

- La Racaille, a Montreal Roller Derby team
- Racaille, a term describing rioters in France's 2005 civil unrest

== See also ==
- Kaillera, verlan of Racaille
- Rocaille, an 18th-century French style
