= Chepoix station =

Railway station in the Somme department, France

Chepoix station (abandoned)

General information
- Location: Chepoix
- Coordinates: 49°36′26″N 2°23′29″E
- Owner: RFF/SNCF
- Line: Paris–Lille railway
- Platforms: 3
- Tracks: 3

History
- Opened: 1846
- Closed: 1945
Location

Chepoix station (Gare de Chepoix) was a railway station on the Paris–Lille railway line, located in the commune of Chepoix in the Somme department, France. The station was located at km 92.6 on the Paris-Lille line.

The station was first opened in 1846 by the Compagnie des chemins de fer du Nord (Nord Railway Company) and served the village of Chepoix. The station was changed into an unattended stop in the 1920s. It closed for passenger trains in 1945 and was never reopened.

The station was abandoned and demolished in the 1980s.

== See also ==
- List of SNCF stations in Hauts-de-France
