= Notre-Dame-de-la-Salette =

Notre Dame de la Salette or Notre-Dame-de-la-Salette can refer to:

- Notre-Dame-de-la-Salette, Quebec, a municipality in Canada
- Notre-Dame-de-la-Salette, Paris, a church in France
- Our Lady of La Salette, (French: Notre-Dame de La Salette), a Marian apparition
- Our Lady of La Salette Cathedral, Antsirabe, (French: Notre-Dame de La Salette) in Madagascar
