= Yvelines's 7th constituency =

Constituency of the National Assembly of France

7th constituency of Yvelines
- inline Constituency of the National Assembly of France

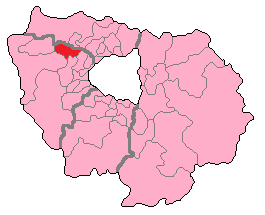
- Yvelines' 7th Constituency shown within Île-de-France
- Deputy: Aurélien Rousseau; PP
- Department: Yvelines
- Cantons: Andrésy, Conflans-Sainte-Honorine, Meulan, Triel-sur-Seine
- Registered voters: 78,358

The 7th constituency of Yvelines is a French legislative constituency in the Yvelines département.

== Description ==
The 7th constituency of Yvelines is the north of the department with the Seine running through it.

Whilst the seat has elected conservatives since the 1993 defeat of former Prime Minister of France Michel Rocard it remains relatively marginal. The UMP candidate Arnaud Richard won the seat by less than 500 votes at the 2012 election.

== Historic Representation ==
Election	Member	Party
1967	Gérard Prioux	UDR
1968	Pierre Ribes	UDR
1973	Pierre Ribes	UDR
1978	Pierre Ribes	RPR
1981	Bernard Schreiner	PS
1986	Proportional representation – no election by constituency	
1988	Michel Rocard	PS
1988	Jean Guigné	PS
1993	Pierre Cardo	UDF
1997	Pierre Cardo	UDF
2002	Pierre Cardo	UMP
2007	Pierre Cardo	UMP
2012	Arnaud Richard	UMP
2017	Michèle de Vaucouleurs	MoDem
2022	Nadia Hai	RE
2024	Aurélien Rousseau	PP

== Election results ==
=== 2024 ===
Candidate	Party	Alliance	First round			Second round		
Candidate	Party	Alliance	Votes	%	+/–	Votes	%	+/–
Aurélien Rousseau	PP	NFP	18,810	34.68	+7.49	21,043	39.14	+4.46
Nadia Hai	RE	ENS	15,903	29.32	-0.23	17,711	32.95	+3.63
Babette de Rozieres	LR-RN	UXD	13,987	25.79	+12.32	15,004	27.91	+2.12
Julien Fréjabue	LR		4,142	7.64	-7.20			
Colette Aubree	REC		516	0.95	-4.00			
Ali Kaya	LO		498	0.92	+0.18			
Jack Lefebvre	EXG		375	0.69	N/A			
Valid votes			54,231	97.88	-0.65	53,758	97.71	-0.17
Blank votes			893	1.61	+0.52	989	1.80	+0.19
Null votes			283	0.51	+0.13	272	.049	-0.02
Turnout			55,407	67.89	+19.34	55,019	67.40	-0.49
Abstentions			26,206	32.11	-19.34	26,616	32.60	+0.49
Registered voters			81,613			81,635		
Source: Ministry of the Interior, Le Monde
Result						PP GAIN		

=== 2022 ===
Legislative Election 2022: Yvelines's 7th constituency
Party	Candidate	Votes	%	±%
LREM (Ensemble)	Nadia Hai	11,401	29.55	-11.16
PS (NUPÉS)	Michèle Christophoul	10,488	27.19	+7.09
LR (UDC)	Laurent Brosse	5,723	14.84	−4.59
RN	Emmanuelle Fortin	5,195	13.47	+4.32
REC	Christèle Didierjean	1,910	4.95	N/A
DVE	Jacques Borie	1,244	3.22	N/A
Others	N/A	2,615	6.78	
Turnout		38,576	48.55	+0.04
2nd round result
LREM (Ensemble)	Nadia Hai	19,889	55.78	+0.21
PS (NUPÉS)	Michèle Christophoul	15,770	44.22	N/A
Turnout		35,659	47.32	+9.92
LREM gain from MoDem				

=== 2017 ===
Legislative Election 2017: Yvelines's 7th constituency
Party	Candidate	Votes	%	±%
MoDem	Michèle de Vaucouleurs	15,924	40.71	
UDI	Arnaud Richard	7,600	19.43	
LFI	Paul Deboutin	4,621	11.81	
FN	Victoria Kostiaeva	3,580	9.15	
EELV	Ghislaine Senee	3,241	8.29	
DVD	Christian Taillebois	1,041	2.66	
DLF	Sandrine Feraud	866	2.21	
Others	N/A	2,239		
Turnout		39,112	48.51	
2nd round result
MoDem	Michèle de Vaucouleurs	16,756	55.57	
UDI	Arnaud Richard	13,395	44.43	
Turnout		30,151	37.40	
MoDem gain from PRV				

=== 2012 ===
Legislative Election 2012: Yvelines's 7th constituency
Party	Candidate	Votes	%	±%
PS	Estelle Rodes	15,420	35.16	
PRV	Arnaud Richard	14,373	32.77	
FN	Alexandre Delport	5,308	12.10	
EELV	Gaël Callonnec	2,831	6.45	
FG	Mouni Coudoux	1,645	3.75	
DVD	Jacques Massacre	1,215	2.77	
MoDem	Denis Faist	1,181	2.69	
Others	N/A	1,885		
Turnout		44,348	56.60	
2nd round result
PRV	Arnaud Richard	21,581	50.51	
PS	Estelle Rodes	21,146	49.49	
Turnout		43,682	55.75	
PRV gain from UMP				

=== 2007 ===
Legislative Election 2007: Yvelines's 7th constituency
Party	Candidate	Votes	%	±%
UMP	Pierre Cardo	22,410	49.56	
DVG	Estelle Rodes	11,069	24.48	
MoDem	Michel Marque	3,676	8.13	
FN	Myriam Baeckeroot	2,077	4.59	
LV	Michele Orcel	1,612	3.56	
Far left	Pierrick Le Roux	1,142	2.53	
PCF	Claudine Huet	1,072	2.37	
Others	N/A	2,162		
Turnout		45,779	60.61	
2nd round result
UMP	Pierre Cardo	23,889	57.80	
DVG	Estelle Rodes	17,442	42.20	
Turnout		42,273	55.97	
UMP hold				

=== 2002 ===
Legislative Election 2002: Yvelines's 7th constituency
Party	Candidate	Votes	%	±%
UMP	Pierre Cardo	20,628	45.87	
PS	Philippe Esnol	13,156	29.25	
FN	Myriam Baeckeroot	5,273	11.72	
LV	Marie-Hélène Driot	1,665	3.70	
PCF	Claudine Huet	994	2.21	
Others	N/A	3,257		
Turnout		45,538	66.14	
2nd round result
UMP	Pierre Cardo	23,756	58.08	
PS	Philippe Esnol	17,146	41.92	
Turnout		42,012	61.02	
UMP gain from UDF				

=== 1997 ===
Legislative Election 1997: Yvelines's 7th constituency
Party	Candidate	Votes	%	±%
UDF	Pierre Cardo	14,257	32.58	
PS	Jean-Paul Huchon	12,448	28.45	
FN	Myriam Baeckroot	7,747	17.70	
PCF	Bernard Minguy	2,236	5.11	
LV	Lucien Ferrier	1,634	3.73	
LO	Guy Belier	1,244	2.84	
DVD	François Jalenques	1,175	2.69	
Others	N/A	3,018		
Turnout		45,387	67.88	
2nd round result
UDF	Pierre Cardo	24,164	52.56	
PS	Jean-Paul Huchon	21,813	47.44	
Turnout		48,400	72.39	
UDF hold				

== Sources ==
Official results of French elections from 2002: "Résultats électoraux officiels en France" (in French).
