= Marguerite Cazeneuve =

French specialist in social affairs, health and pensions (born 1988)

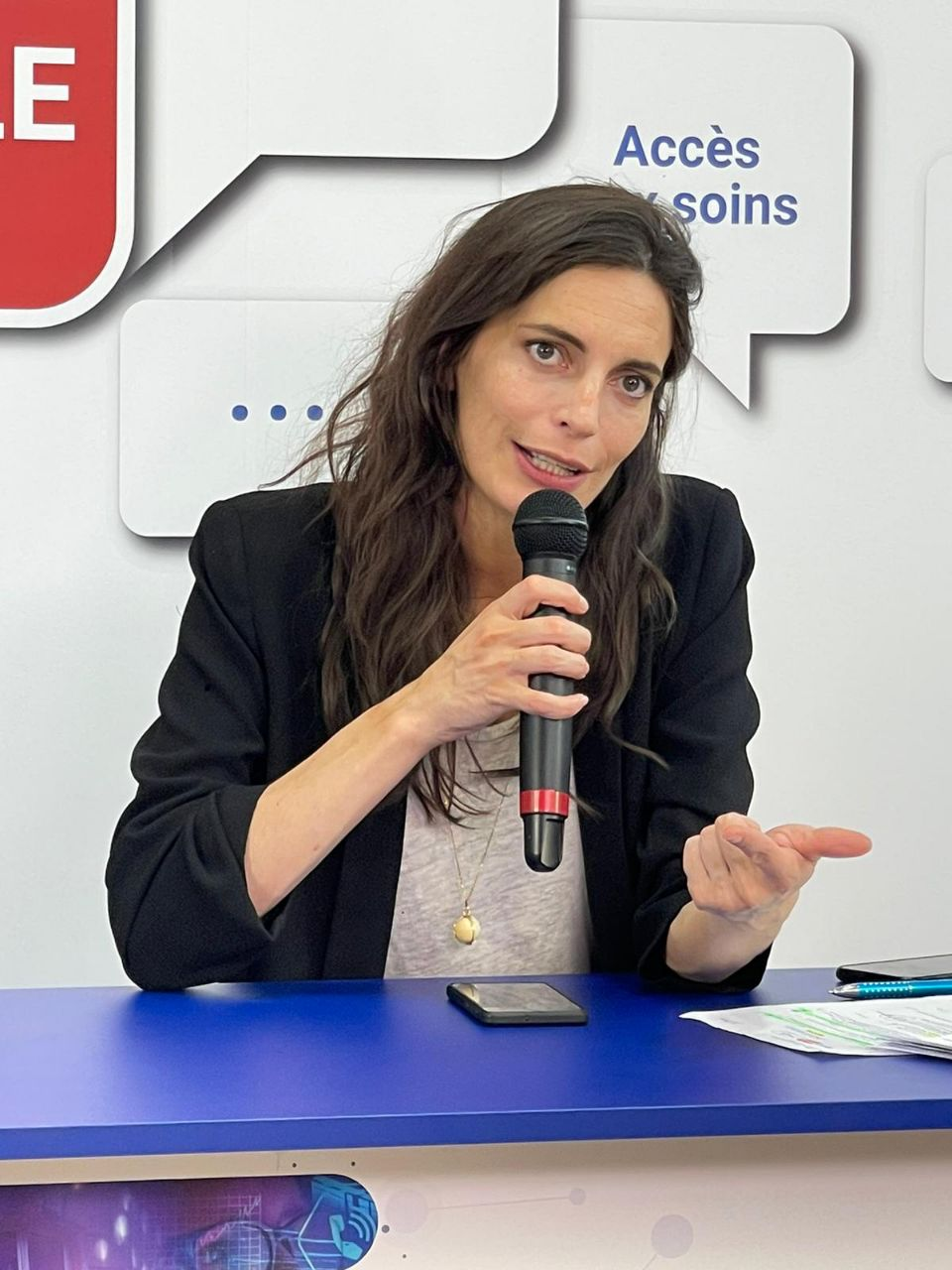
- Cazeneuve in 2022

Advisor to President of France
- President: Emmanuel Macron

Personal details
- Born: 10 August 1988 (age 38) France
- Party: Renaissance
- Spouse: Aurélien Rousseau (m. 2021)
- Children: 3
- Parent: Jean-René Cazeneuve (father)
- Relatives: Pierre Cazeneuve (brother)
- Education: HEC Paris

Marguerite Cazeneuve (born 1988) is a French specialist in social affairs, health and pensions. She is an adviser of President Emmanuel Macron.

== Biography ==
She was a student at HEC Paris from 2008 to 2013, where she was elected president of the student office. She did internships at Procter & Gamble (end of 2010) and at McKinsey (2011). She specializes during her course (master's degree in "media, arts and creation").

In December 2014, spotted during this mission, she was recruited at the Ministry of Social Affairs and Health, and appointed secretary general of the ONDAM steering committee.

In July 2021, when Jean Castex became Prime Minister, his chief of staff Nicolas Revel promoted her to head of the health-solidarity-social protection division of his cabinet. In this capacity, it oversees the management of the COVID-19 crisis for the Government.

In March 2021, she was appointed deputy director at the National Fund for Health Insurance.

She coordinates Emmanuel Macron's program on health, autonomy, social protection and pensions during the presidential campaign of 2022.

== Personal life ==
She is the daughter of Jean-René Cazeneuve, deputy for Gers, and Béatrice Cazeneuve, executive at Eli Lilly France.

She is married to Aurélien Rousseau, former Minister of Health, member of the Council of State and director of the Prime Minister's cabinet between 2022 and 2023.
