= Chepoix =

- Commune
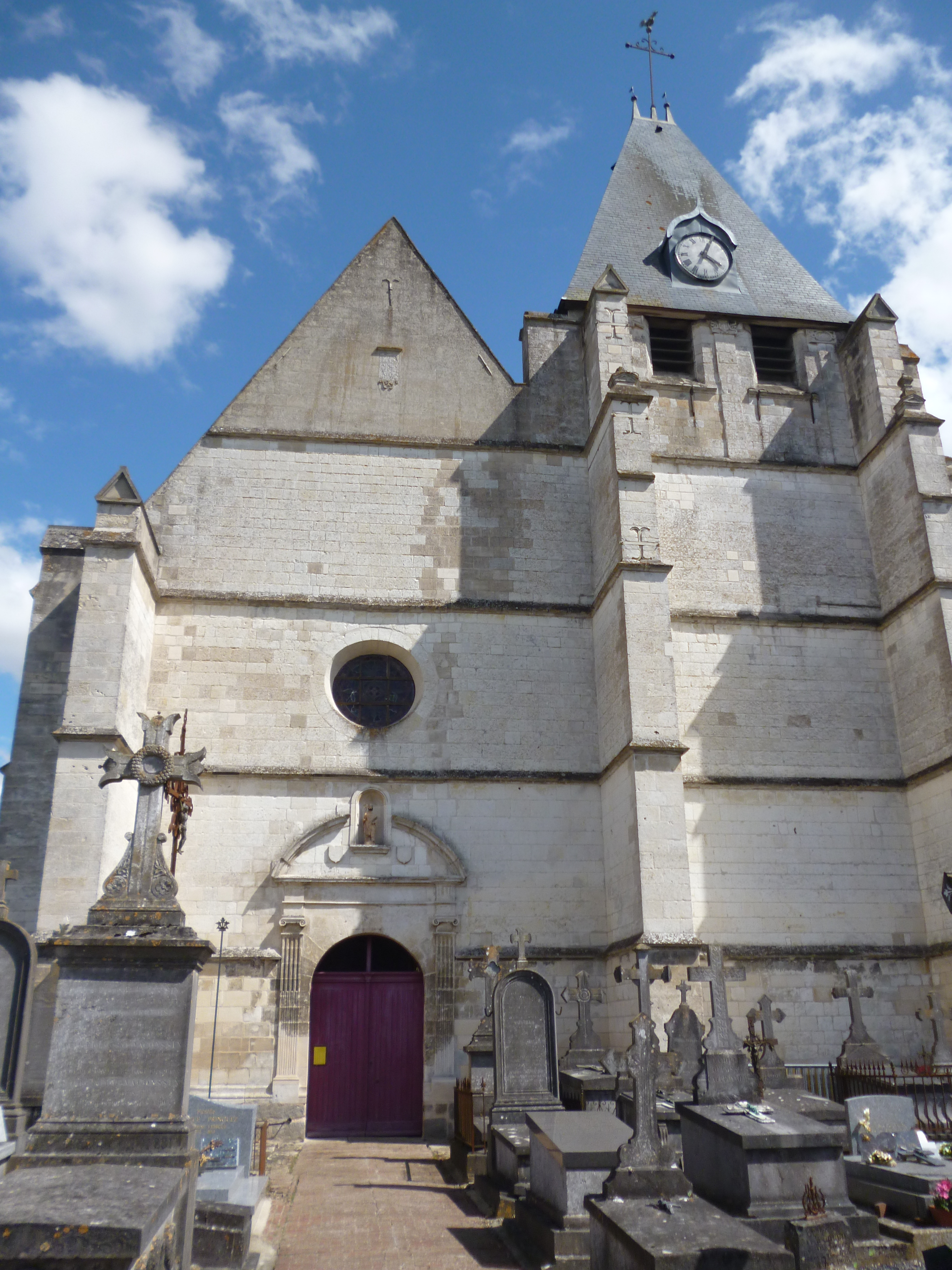
- The church in Chepoix
- Location of Chepoix
- Location within France Location within Hauts-de-France
- Coordinates: 49°36′21″N 2°22′56″E
- Country: France
- Region: Hauts-de-France
- Department: Oise
- Arrondissement: Clermont
- Canton: Saint-Just-en-Chaussée

Government
  - Mayor (2020–2026): Jacques Taveau
- Area^{1}: 8.86 km^{2} (3.42 sq mi)
- Elevation: 107 m (351 ft)
- Highest elevation: 155 m (509 ft)
- Lowest elevation: 88 m (289 ft)
- Population (2023): 442
  - Density: 49.9/km^{2} (129/sq mi)
- Time zone: UTC+01:00 (CET)
  - Summer (DST): UTC+02:00 (CEST)
- INSEE/Postal code: 60146 /60120
- ^{1} French Land Register data, which excludes lakes, ponds, glaciers > 1 km^{2} (0.386 sq mi or 247 acres) and river estuaries.

Chepoix (French pronunciation: [ʃəpwa]) is a commune in the Oise department in northern France.

== See also ==
- Gare de Chepoix
- Communes of the Oise department
