= Michèle de Vaucouleurs =

French politician

Member of the National Assembly for Yvelines's 7th constituency
- In office 21 June 2017 – 22 June 2022
- Preceded by: Arnaud Richard
- Succeeded by: Nadia Hai

Personal details
- Born: 12 February 1964 (age 62) Albertville, France
- Party: MoDem
- Education: Paris Nanterre University

Michèle de Vaucouleurs (born 12 February 1964) is a French politician representing the Democratic Movement. She was elected to the French National Assembly on 18 June 2017, representing Yvelines's 7th constituency.
