= Autorité de Régulation des Activités Ferroviaires =

French governmental rail transportation agency

The Autorité de Régulation des Activités Ferroviaires is a French government agency which regulates rail transport.

ARAF was officially founded in December 2010, but there was considerable informal work before that date. The headquarters is in Le Mans. and Pierre Cardo was appointed as its first president. ARAF is funded by a levy on track access fees paid to RFF. The president of ARAF is Pierre Cardo.

Much of ARAF's early work involves Réseau Ferré de France and track access. A key part of its role is to encourage competition in rail transport, following the Second Railway Package and Third Railway Package.

In May 2013, the French government announced plans to reform SNCF Infra and RFF and create a single national infrastructure operator; this may lead to ARAF taking a bigger role in ensuring equal access for other train operators.
