= Patrick Ollier =

French politician

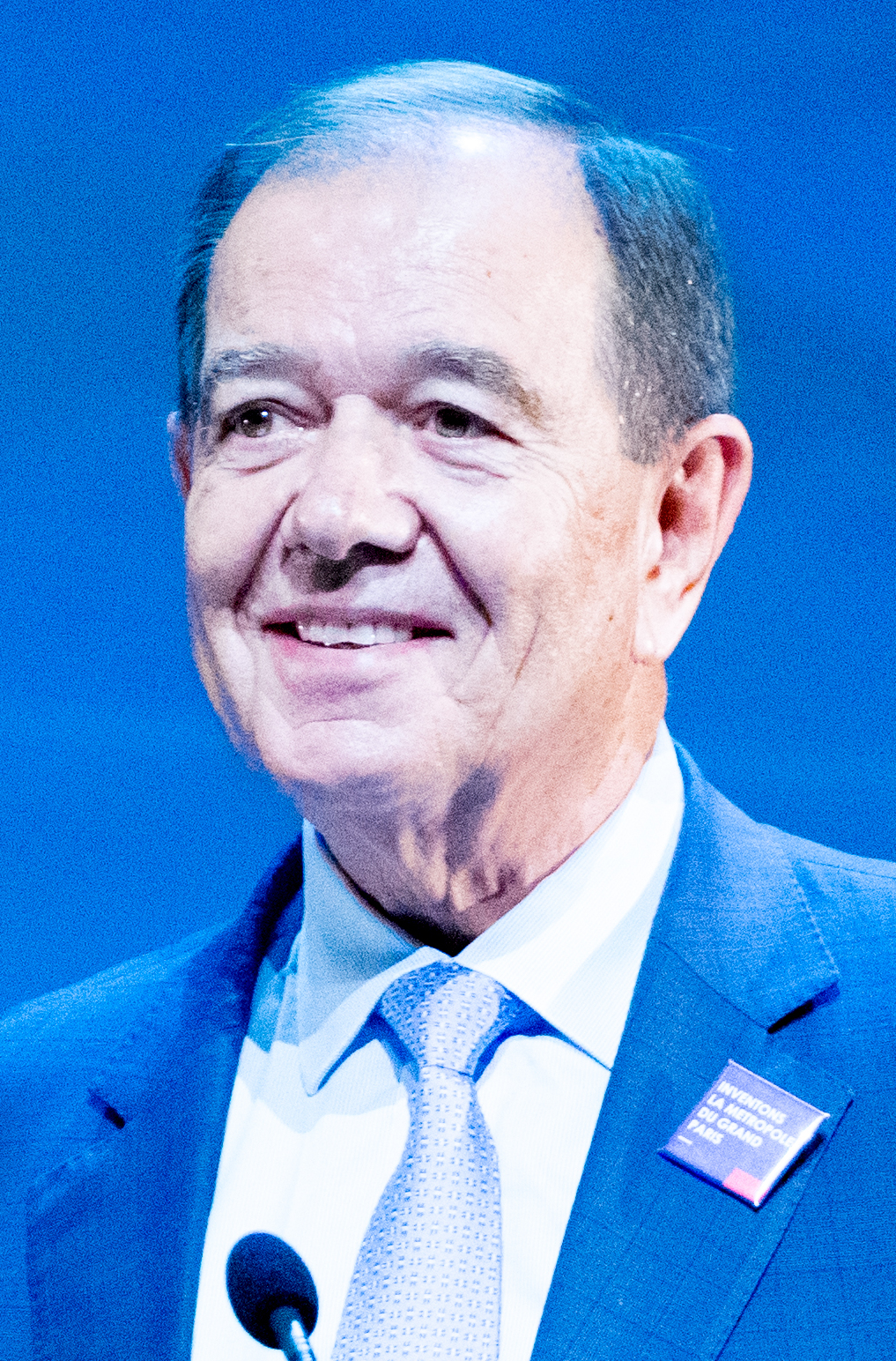
- Ollier in 2018

Mayor of Rueil-Malmaison
- Incumbent
- Assumed office 18 June 2004
- Preceded by: Jacques Baumel

President of the National Assembly
- In office 7 March 2007 – 19 June 2007
- Preceded by: Jean-Louis Debré
- Succeeded by: Bernard Accoyer

Minister for Relations with Parliament
- In office 14 November 2010 – 10 May 2012
- President: Nicolas Sarkozy
- Prime Minister: François Fillon
- Preceded by: Henri de Raincourt
- Succeeded by: Alain Vidalies

Member of the National Assembly
- In office 20 June 2012 – 20 June 2017
- Preceded by: Éric Berdoati
- Succeeded by: Jacques Marilossian
- Constituency: Hauts-de-Seine's 7th
- In office 19 June 2002 – 15 December 2010
- Preceded by: Jacques Baumel
- Succeeded by: Éric Berdoati
- Constituency: Hauts-de-Seine's 7th
- In office 23 June 1988 – 18 June 2002
- Preceded by: Robert de Caumont
- Succeeded by: Joël Giraud
- Constituency: Hautes-Alpes's 2nd

Personal details
- Born: 17 December 1944 (age 81) Périgueux, France
- Party: The Republicans (2015–present)
- Other political affiliations: Union for a Popular Movement (2002–2015)
- Domestic partner: Michèle Alliot-Marie
- Education: Sciences Po Aix

Patrick Ollier (French pronunciation: [patʁik ɔlje]; born 17 December 1944) is a French politician. He is the Mayor of Rueil-Malmaison. He was a national assembly deputy for Hauts-Alpes's 2nd constituency from 1988 to 2002, as a member of the UMP. Secondly for Hauts-de-Seine's 7th constituency from 2002 to 2017. He was briefly the President of the National Assembly in 2007. He is the partner of Michèle Alliot-Marie, Minister of Foreign and European Affairs in the government of François Fillon.

He was elected on 16 June 2002, representing the Hauts-de-Seine, near Paris. He is president of the French National Assembly's committee on Economic Affairs, the Environment, and Territory. He is interested in renewable energies, and Africa, being head of the French-Libyan friendship group in the National Assembly.

On 14 January 2007 he announced that he would be candidate to the presidency of the National Assembly, replacing Jean-Louis Debré, who would join the Constitutional Council. He ended up as the only candidate, as the opposition refused to take part in the vote, and was elected on 7 March 2007. However, and although he had expressed the wish to remain President of the Assembly, he was not chosen by the UMP group as its candidate for the presidency after the legislative election, and was succeeded by Bernard Accoyer on 26 June of the same year.

== Private life ==
He is also the partner of Michèle Alliot-Marie, who was the French minister of Foreign and European Affairs in the Government of François Fillon from 14 November 2010 to 27 February 2011. Mr Ollier is an Honorary member of the Rotary Club of Rueil Malmaison and a public officer.

== Public life ==
Ollier is Mayor in the city of Rueil Malmaison. Rueil is a high-class suburb of Paris.

He was a deputy of the national assembly, and was its president from March to June 2007.

== Parliamentary work ==
Ollier, following General de Gaulle's social positions, is the inventor of the "Work's dividend" who has been taken back in many Government decisions and parliamentary works.

=== Renewable energy ===
In 2005, during a debate on energy law, Patrick Ollier presented an amendment on wind power known as the "Ollier Amendment." It aimed to raise the minimum electrical output of wind farms that qualify for automatic electricity repurchase by the EDF to those that produce more than 30MW (from the previous 12MW.) It also limited construction of wind farms to designated areas that were to be defined later. This caused an outcry from various environmental organizations. When faced with this opposition, the amendment was withdrawn.

=== SRU Law ===
- M. Ollier constantly worked to amend the SRU law (solidarité et renouvellement urbains) (solidarity and urban renewal) of December 2000, and specially to amend and decrease the quota of 20% of social apartments forced to the French municipalities.
- Ending January 2006, the SRU law was decreased by the National Assembly of the French Parliament by the adoption of a Patrick Ollier and Gérard Hamel's amendment, in first lecture (which means in the Parliamentary procedure that it has the governmental support) on a law project (loi ENL). This amendment Ollier-Hamel allowed to consider some real-estate operation to social accession to property as some social apartments. The French Senate suppressed these measures in April 2006.
- On 30 May 2006, in the National Assembly, on a second-lecture of the law project (ENL), Patrick Ollier proposed again one amendment against the 20% quota of social apartments (logements sociaux) forced to 740 French municipalities.

== Africa ==
- Patrick Ollier is head of the France-Libya friendship group of the French Parliament. He made several visits in that country, sometimes for the Élysée or the Quai d'Orsay. Patrick Ollier's relations with Arab regimes, particularly with General Muammar Gaddafi were denounced in February 2011 by the French press and foreign. In its 24 February edition of the newspaper Libération assert that Patrick Ollier "served as an intermediary for the sale of arms" between the France and Libya.
- Following Réseau Voltaire, he would have helped Elf to develop a plant in Nigeria.
- In the Clearstream affair 2, his name has been cited in the meeting of the 9 janvier 2004 between Dominique de Villepin, Philippe Rondot and Jean-Louis Gergorin in the Ministry of Foreign Affairs. Jean-Louis Gergorin cited then «excessives links» of Patrick Ollier with Arab countries. Le général Philippe Rondot aurait délibérément caché au ministre de la Défense que le nom de son conjoint avait été mentionné. Selon son témoignage, il avait reçu comme consigne de Dominique de Villepin de «ne rien communiquer au ministère de la Défense». Toutefois, il semble que son nom ne figurait pas dans les listings truqués de Clearstream. Patrick Ollier s'est constitué partie civile dans ce dossier.

== Official positions ==
Patrick Ollier took often clear position: signature of the anti-PACS petition (civilian agreement of common life for hetero- and homosexual), opposition to the ("IVG" - Voluntary Pregnancy Interruption) (abortion) reform in 2000. He refused to acknowledge the date of 19 March 1962 as "Journée nationale du souvenir et de recueillement à la mémoire des victimes civiles et militaires de la guerre d'Algérie et des combats du Maroc et de Tunisie". (National Remembrance Day in memory of civilian and military victims of the Algerian war and the combats in Morocco and Tunisia)

In June and July 2006, he worked actively for the privatization of the French public company of gas Gaz de France and its fusion with Suez to form GDF Suez.

== Political career ==
Governmental functions

- Minister for Relationships with Parliament : 2010–2012.

Electoral mandates

National Assembly of France

- President of the National Assembly of France : March–June 2007.
- Vice President of the National Assembly of France : 1998–2002.
- Member of the National Assembly of France for Hauts-de-Seine (7th constituency) : 2002-2010 (He became minister in 2010, and was replaced by Éric Berdoati) / Since 2012. Elected in 2002, reelected in 2007, 2012.
- Member of the National Assembly of France for Hautes-Alpes (2nd constituency) : 1988–2002. Elected in 1988, reelected in 1993, 1997.
- President of the Economic Affairs Committee in the National Assembly : Since 2009-2010 (Became Minister in 2010).
- President of the Economic Affairs, Environment and Territory Committee in the National Assembly : 2002–2009.

General Council

- General councillor of Hautes-Alpes : 1992-2001 (Resignation). Reelected in 1998.

Municipal Council

- President of the Council of Métropole du Grand Paris : since 2016 (indirect election).
- Mayor of Rueil-Malmaison : Since 2004. Reelected in 2008 and 2014.
- Deputy-mayor of Rueil-Malmaison : 1983-1989 / 2001–2004.
- Municipal councillor of Rueil-Malmaison : 1983-1989 / Since 2001. Reelected in 2001, 2008, 2014.
- Mayor of La Salle les Alpes : 1989–2001. Reelected in 1995.
- Municipal councillor of La Salle les Alpes : 1989–2001. Reelected in 1995.

== Honors and Awards ==
Officer of the Order of Legion of Honours

Political offices
Preceded by Jean-Louis Debré	President of the French National Assembly; 2007	Succeeded by Bernard Accoyer
Preceded by Henri de Raincourt	Minister for Relations with Parliament; 2010–2012	Succeeded by Alain Vidalies
