= Pierre Cazeneuve =

French politician (born 1995)

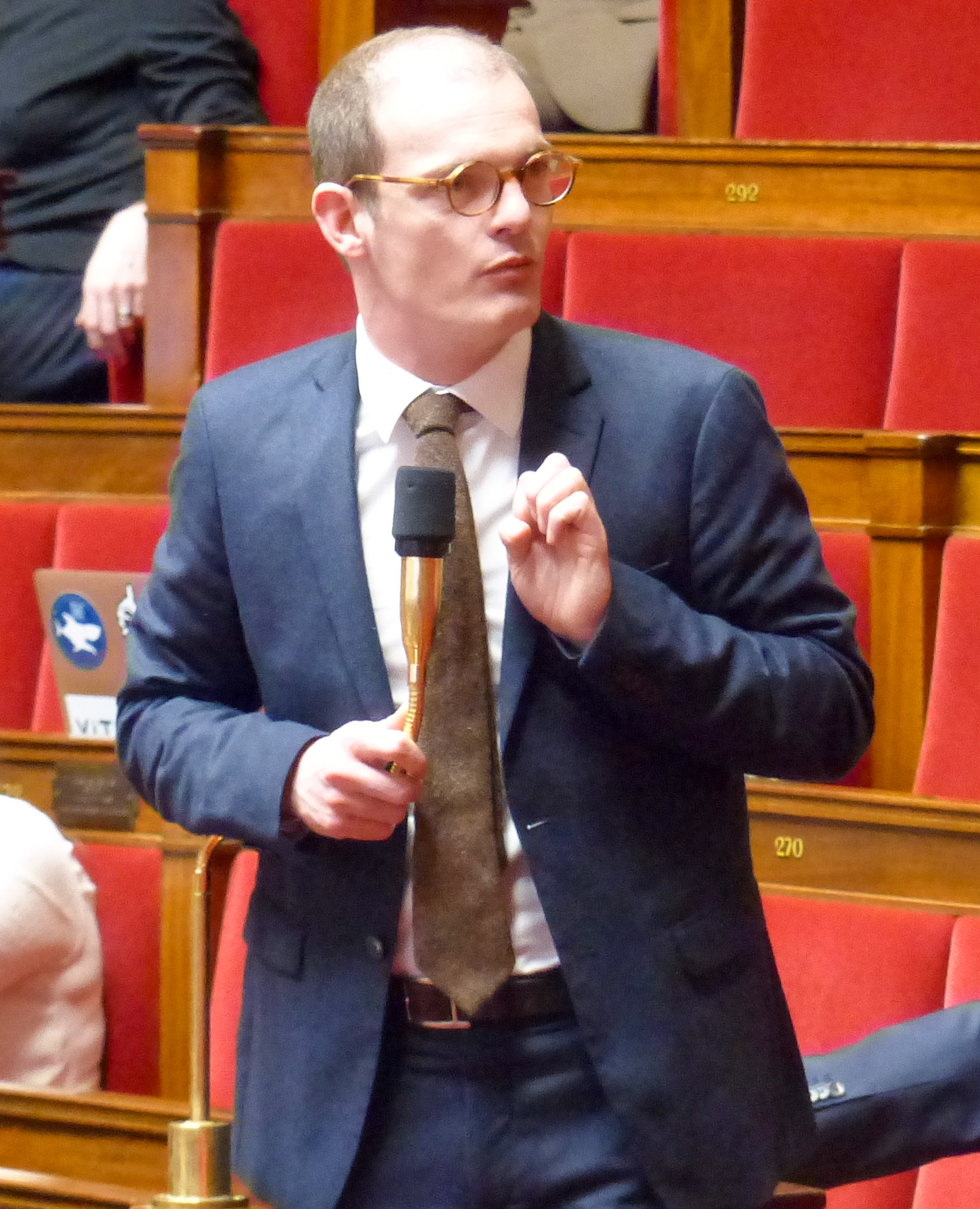
- Cazeneuve in 2025

Member of the National Assembly for Hauts-de-Seine's 7th constituency
- Incumbent
- Assumed office 22 June 2022
- Preceded by: Jacques Marilossian

Member of the Municipal council of Saint-Cloud
- Incumbent
- Assumed office 4 April 2014
- Mayor: Éric Berdoati

Personal details
- Born: 11 March 1995 (age 31) Saint-Cloud, France
- Party: Renaissance
- Other political affiliations: Allons enfants (formerly)
- Relations: Marguerite Cazeneuve (sister)
- Parent: Jean-René Cazeneuve
- Education: Sciences Po; HEC Paris

Pierre Cazeneuve (French pronunciation: [pjɛʁ kaznœv]; born 11 March 1995) is a French politician of Renaissance (RE) who has represented the 7th constituency of the Hauts-de-Seine department in the National Assembly since 2022.

== Early life and education ==
Cazeneuve was born in Saint-Cloud on 11 March 1995, the son of Jean-René Cazeneuve and his wife Béatrice. He has a sister, Marguerite. He earned his Baccalauréat in 2012 with a mention très bien and enrolled at Sciences Po.

== Political career ==
Cazeneuve was elected to the municipal council of Saint-Cloud in 2014. In 2020, he was appointed deputy chief of staff at the Élysée.

Cazeneuve was selected as the La République En Marche! (LREM, later Renaissance) candidate in the 7th constituency of Hauts-de-Seine for the 2022 legislative election; he succeeded fellow party member Jacques Marilossian in office, who failed to be selected again. Cazeneuve, elected under the Ensemble (ENS) alliance, easily won the seat in the second round with 72% of the vote against Sandro Rato of La France Insoumise (FI), who ran under the New Ecological and Social People's Union (NUPES) alliance.

Cazeneuve had previously run for the seat in the 2017 legislative election for Allons enfants, a social-liberal youth party he launched in 2015.

In Parliament, Cazeneuve serves as member of the Committee on Sustainable Development, Spatial and Regional Planning. In this capacity, he has been his parliamentary group's rapporteur on renewable energy since 2022. His father Jean-René Cazeneuve has held the seat for the 1st constituency of Gers since 2017.

In addition to his committee assignments, Cazeneuve is part of the parliamentary friendship groups with New Zealand, the United States, China, Germany, the United Kingdom, Israel and Madagascar.
