= Hauts-de-Seine's 7th constituency =

Constituency of the National Assembly of France

7th constituency of Hauts-de-Seine
- inline Constituency of the National Assembly of France

- Deputy: Pierre Cazeneuve; RE
- Department: Hauts-de-Seine
- Cantons: Garches, Rueil-Malmaison, Saint-Cloud.
- Registered voters: 83,959

The 7th constituency of the Hauts-de-Seine is a French legislative constituency in the Hauts-de-Seine département.

== Description ==
Hauts-de-Seine's 7th constituency sits in the centre of the department bordering Paris just north of Boulogne-Billancourt and Yvelines to the west. It includes the extremely wealthy suburb of Saint-Cloud as well as Garches to the west and Rueil-Malmaison to the north west all of which form continuous urban area.

Politically the seat is solidly conservative. The version of the seat prior to 1986, however, largely corresponded to the current Hauts-de-Seine's 4th constituency and contained the towns of Nanterre and Suresnes, electing a French Communist Party deputy at every election.

== Historic representatives ==
Election	Member	Party	Notes
1967	Raymond Barbet	PCF	
1968	Raymond Barbet	PCF	
1973	Raymond Barbet	PCF	
1978	Raymond Barbet	PCF	
1981	Raymond Barbet	PCF	
1986	Proportional representation – no election by constituency		
1988	Jacques Baumel	RPR	
1993	Jacques Baumel	RPR	
1997	Jacques Baumel	RPR	
2002	Patrick Ollier	UMP	
2007	Patrick Ollier	UMP	Appointed Minister for Relationships with Parliament
2010	Éric Berdoati	UMP	Substitute for Ollier
2012	Patrick Ollier	UMP	
2017	Jacques Marilossian	LREM	
2022	Pierre Cazeneuve	RE	

== Election results ==
=== 2024 ===
Candidate	Party	Alliance	First round			Second round		
Candidate	Party	Alliance	Votes	%	+/–	Votes	%	+/–
Pierre Cazeneuve	RE	ENS	34,053	53.20	+11.29			
Lucas Peyret	LFI	NFP	14,749	23.04	+4.62			
Christine Pastor	RN		12,057	18.84	+12.48			
Charlotte Richard	DVE		1,633	2.55	N/A			
Rémi Carillon	REC		1,089	1.69	-5.04			
Cécile Abad	LO		431	0.67	+0.17			
Valid votes			64,006	97.71	-0.68			
Blank votes			1,198	1.83	+0.48			
Null votes			304	0.46	+0.20			
Turnout			65,508	74.16	+18.66			
Abstentions			22,831	25.84	-18.66			
Registered voters			88,339					
Source: Ministry of the Interior, Le Monde
Result						RE HOLD		

=== 2022 ===
Legislative Election 2022: Hauts-de-Seine's 7th constituency
Party	Candidate	Votes	%	±%
LREM (Ensemble)	Pierre Cazeneuve	20,120	41.91	-6.57
LFI (NUPÉS)	Sandro Rato	8,842	18.42	+6.88
LR (UDC)	Xabi Elizagoyen	8,694	18.11	−9.80
REC	Agnès Dumont	3,233	6.73	N/A
RN	Christophe Versini	3,054	6.36	+2.02
DVE	Christophe Mandereau	1,805	3.76	N/A
Others	N/A	2,259		
Turnout		48,796	55.50	−1.42
2nd round result
LREM (Ensemble)	Pierre Cazeneuve	30,710	72.06	+14.25
LFI (NUPÉS)	Sandro Rato	11,906	27.94	N/A
Turnout		42,616	51.80	+2.27
LREM hold				

=== 2017 ===
Candidate	Label	First round		Second round	
Candidate	Label	Votes	%	Votes	%
Jacques Marilossian	REM	23,635	48.48	23,492	57.81
Éric Berdoati	LR	13,606	27.91	17,144	42.19
Olfa Mzoughi	FI	2,636	5.41		
Vincent Poizat	ECO	2,428	4.98		
Lucia Laporte	FN	2,116	4.34		
Pierre Cazeneuve	DIV	1,207	2.48		
Grégory Berthault	ECO	720	1.48		
Sophie Souchère	DLF	613	1.26		
Maryline Nguyen	PCF	560	1.15		
Jérôme Guery	EXD	409	0.84		
Jérôme Lecart	DIV	405	0.83		
Noureddine Hannouf	DVD	245	0.50		
Cécile Abad	EXG	172	0.35		
Votes		48,752	100.00	40,636	100.00
Valid votes		48,752	98.80	40,636	94.64
Blank votes		462	0.94	1,858	4.33
Null votes		132	0.27	443	1.03
Turnout		49,346	56.93	42,937	49.53
Abstentions		37,339	43.07	43,753	50.47
Registered voters		86,685		86,690	

=== 2012 ===
2012 legislative election in Hauts-De-Seine's 7th constituency
Candidate	Party	First round		Second round	
Candidate	Party	Votes	%	Votes	%
Patrick Ollier	UMP	23,944	47.49%	28,617	63.04%
Bertrand Rocheron	PS	14,569	28.90%	16,778	36.96%
Lucia Laporte	FN	3,678	7.30%		
François Jeanmaire	UMP dissident	2,734	5.42%		
Olivier Hosteins	MoDem	2,039	4.04%		
Camille Barre	FG	1,324	2.63%		
Jean-Christophe Pierson	PCD	1,263	2.51%		
Laurent Blanchard	PP	604	1.20%		
Anne-Laure Chaudon	LO	142	0.28%		
Gabriel Rosenman	NPA	119	0.24%		
Valid votes		50,416	99.03%	45,395	97.12%
Spoilt and null votes		493	0.97%	1,347	2.88%
Votes cast / turnout		50,909	60.64%	46,742	55.67%
Abstentions		33,050	39.36%	37,217	44.33%
Registered voters		83,959	100.00%	83,959	100.00%

=== 2007 ===
Legislative Election 2007: Hauts-de-Seine's 7th constituency
Party	Candidate	Votes	%	±%
UMP	Patrick Ollier	31,368	60.29	
PS	Bertrand Rocheron	8,338	16.03	
MoDem	André Cros	6,046	11.62	
LV	Julien Sage	1,661	3.19	
FN	Jeannine Naert	1,588	3.05	
Others	N/A	3,024		
Turnout		52,567	63.42	
UMP hold				

=== 2002 ===
Legislative Election 2002: Hauts-de-Seine's 7th constituency
Party	Candidate	Votes	%	±%
UMP	Patrick Ollier	25,444	48.86	
PS	Souhila Nador	10,413	20.00	
DVD	Thierry Saussez	6,562	12.60	
FN	Jeannine Naert	3,561	6.84	
LV	Yves Lagache	1,139	2.19	
Others	N/A	4,959		
Turnout		52,595	66.52	
2nd round result
UMP	Patrick Ollier	30,505	68.52	
PS	Souhila Nador	14,013	31.48	
Turnout		45,981	58.16	
UMP hold				

=== 1997 ===
Legislative Election 1997: Hauts-de-Seine's 7th constituency
Party	Candidate	Votes	%	±%
RPR	Jacques Baumel	23,699	49.90	
PS	Christiane Maulion	9,310	19.60	
FN	Christian Maréchal	5,505	11.59	
PCF	Jean-Raymond Pacouret	2,082	4.38	
LV	Yves Lagache	1,357	2.86	
DVD	Roger Tron	1,345	2.83	
DIV	Stéphanie Mortimore	971	2.04	
Others	N/A	3,222		
Turnout		49,292	65.77	
2nd round result
RPR	Jacques Baumel	31,430	67.10	
PS	Christiane Maulion	15,409	32.90	
Turnout		49,028	65.42	
RPR hold				

== Sources ==
- Official results of French elections from 1998: "Résultats électoraux officiels en France" (in French). Archived from the original on 20 December 2011.
