= Éric Berdoati =

French politician (born 1964)

Mayor of Saint-Cloud
- Incumbent
- Assumed office 13 June 2005
- Preceded by: Bertrand Cuny

Member of the National Assembly for Hauts-de-Seine's 7th constituency
- In office 2010–2012
- Preceded by: Patrick Ollier
- Succeeded by: Patrick Ollier

Personal details
- Born: 9 May 1964 (age 61) Vincennes, France
- Party: Independent

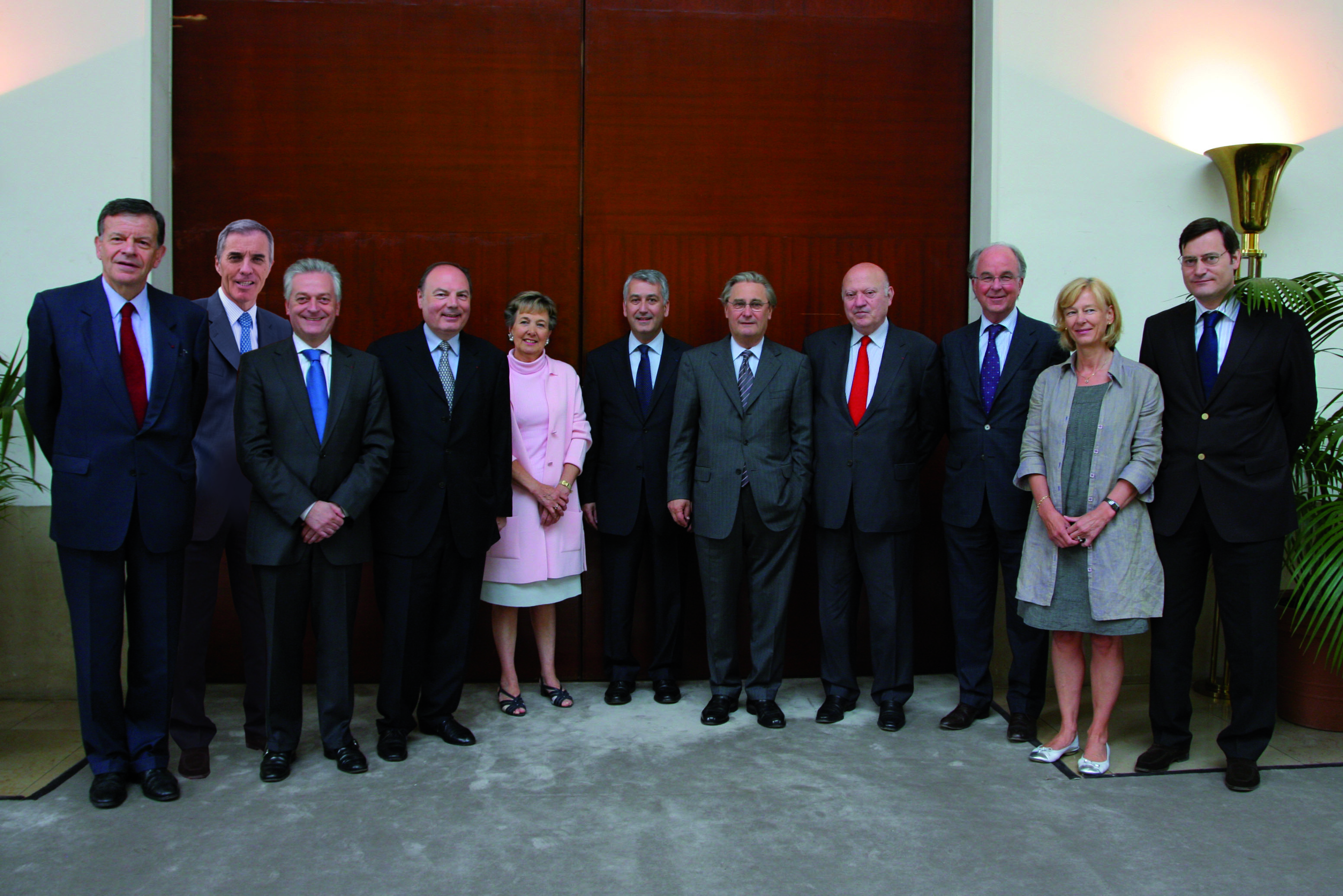
The Mayors of the Coteaux and Val de Seine Joint Association- Eric Berdoati on the far right.

Éric Berdoati (born 9 May 1964) is a French politician who has served as the mayor of Saint-Cloud since 2005.

== Political career ==
Berdoati served as a member of the National Assembly from 2010 to 2012, where he represented Hauts-de-Seine's 7th constituency. At the 2017 election he was the candidate for the Republicans in Hauts-de-Seine's 7th constituency, losing to LREM's Jacques Marilossian.

In 2019, Berdoati publicly declared his support for incumbent President Emmanuel Macron.
