= Gestionnaire d'Infrastructure Unifié =

Proposed public-sector organization in France

The Gestionnaire d'Infrastructure Unifié (French pronunciation: [ʒɛstjɔnɛʁ dɛ̃fʁastʁyktyʁ ynifje], Unified Infrastructure Manager), or GIU, was a proposed public-sector organisation in France, which would have taken over the management of rail infrastructure from Réseau Ferré de France and SNCF Infra.

These separate bodies had previously been spun off in an attempt to comply with European laws on rail liberalisation, but were not fully independent, and SNCF continued to have a monopoly. They have also accumulated huge debts; RFF alone owes €32 billion. In October 2012, Frédéric Cuvillier, the French Minister for Transport, announced plans to combine rail infrastructure into a single organisation, Gestionnaire d'Infrastructure Unifié. Legislation was discussed, took effect at the start of 2015.
