= Action Police CFTC =

Trade union of France

Action Police CFTC is a very small police union in France, affiliated with the Confédération Française des Travailleurs Chrétiens (CFTC) Christian trade union confederation.

In the 2003 elections of union representatives among the police, Action Police CFTC took 0.32% of the vote. Its rhetoric emphasises the "acknowledgement of the Judeo-Christian roots of Europe and attachment to Christian social morals".

Their leader, Thooris, displays the royalist fleur-de-lis and cross on the French flag on his internet site. He is also a member of the far-right Mouvement pour la France political party.

== Notable events ==
=== Monsieur R. ===
Action Police CFTC was noticed nationwide when its leader Michel Thooris protested on the television against a rapper, "Monsieur R.", who mocked the police in a song, "FranSSe" (on the album Politikment incorrekt).

=== 2005 French riots ===
At the beginning of the 2005 French riots, Action Police CFTC caused national outrage by describing the events as "civil war", and requesting the intervention of the French Army in a letter to the Minister of the Interior, Nicolas Sarkozy:

A civil war is currently taking place in Clichy-sous-Bois. Snipers are sniping [franglais; "snipent" in the original text] at the police. We cannot master the situation alone anymore; my colleagues have neither the equipment, nor the formation nor the training for street fighting. Only the army, which is trained and equipped for this sort of mission, can safely intervene to stabilise the situation.

Lucien Cozzoli, national secretary for the police union Unsa-Police-Paris, strongly attacked the request. Bruno Beschizza, leader of Synergie, a police union which represents 42% of police officers, warned against retaliation by far right or Islamic elements. Regarding the letter to the Interior minister, he stated, "It is up to the police and the gendarmerie to patrol these quarters, not to the army, because this is not a war. The residents are not our enemies."

During the 49th Congress of the European Trade Union Confederation, on the 17 November 2005, the leaders of the CFTC were reprimanded by John Monks for the behaviour of Action Police CFTC. "This is the last time you say such things, I don't want to hear you again," Monks said to the leaders of Action Police CFTC. Thooris later said that "The CFTC does not manage to understand that we are in a peculiar situation, with youth armed with bazookas, kalachnikov, heavy weapons and that we are not equipped for this."

== Positions ==
Describing itself as "apolitical", Action Police CFTC nevertheless adopts positions on matters of internal politics, notably:

- against the right of vote for foreigners, as suggested by Nicolas Sarkozy
- against the revision of the 1905 law about the separation of Church and State, specifically citing fears that this would result in government funding for Muslims
