= SNCF Infra =

SNCF Infra logo

SNCF Infra was the infrastructure division of SNCF, the former nationalised railway operator in France. It has 51,000 employees and revenue was €5.5Bn in 2012.

In order to comply with EU regulations on opening up railways to competition, SNCF was to be split into two parts; SNCF would continue to own trains whilst RFF managed infrastructure. However, many infrastructure staff were never transferred to Réseau Ferré de France, so RFF delegates work to SNCF Infra. This has caused several problems, and SNCF still has a monopoly. In October 2012, Frédéric Cuvillier, the French Minister for Transport, announced plans to combine rail infrastructure into a single organisation, Gestionnaire d’Infrastructure Unifié, or GIU.

SNCF Infra has a number of subsidiaries, including SYSTRA, and the Direction de la Circulation Ferroviaire (DCF), a nominally independent body which manages traffic on behalf of RFF.

On 1 January 2015, Réseau ferré de France (RFF) merged with SNCF Infra and the Direction de la circulation ferroviaire (DCF) and became SNCF Réseau.
