= Jacques Marilossian =

French politician

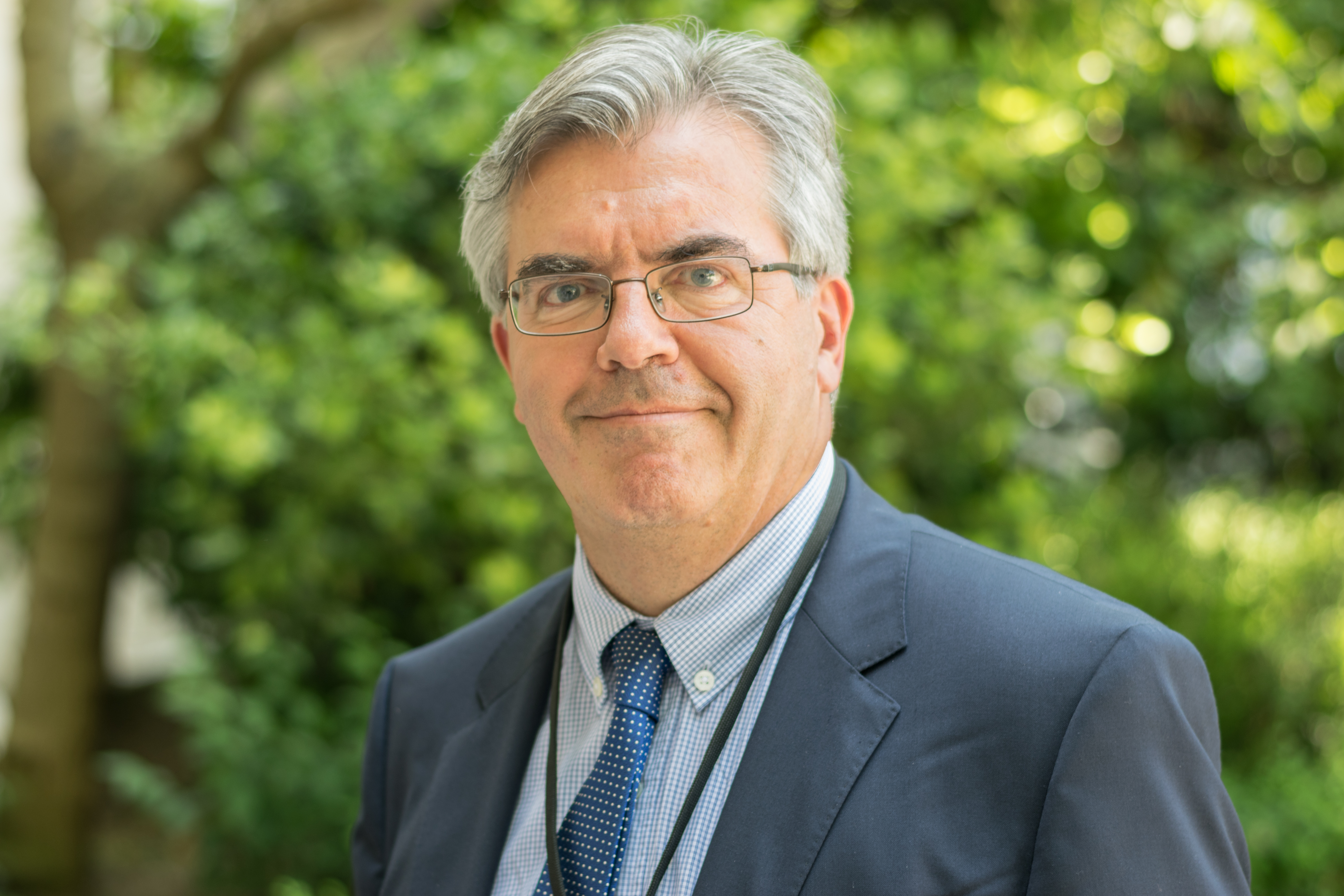

Member of the National Assembly for Hauts-de-Seine's 7th constituency
- In office 21 June 2017 – 21 June 2022
- Preceded by: Patrick Ollier
- Succeeded by: Pierre Cazeneuve

Personal details
- Born: 26 July 1958 (age 68) Le Puy-en-Velay, France
- Party: La République En Marche! (since 2016)
- Other political affiliations: Socialist Party (until 2016)
- Education: École Centrale Paris; Sciences Po; University of Paris 1 Pantheon-Sorbonne

Jacques Marilossian (born 26 July 1958) is a French politician of La République En Marche! (LREM) who was elected to the French National Assembly on 18 June 2017, representing the department of Hauts-de-Seine.

== Early life and career ==
The grandchild of immigrants who survived the Armenian genocide, Marilossian holds degrees in engineering from École Centrale Paris (ECP), public service from Sciences Po, and economics from University of Paris 1 Pantheon-Sorbonne. Before entering politics, he worked as an independent consultant on information systems strategy for companies in the energy sector. Marilossian is also a member of the board of directors of the Institute of Advanced Studies in National Defence (IHEDN).

== Political career ==
In parliament, Marilossian serves on the Defense Committee. In addition to his committee assignments, he is a member of the French-Armenian Parliamentary Friendship Group and of the French delegation to the Assemblée parlementaire de la Francophonie.

== Political positions ==
In July 2019, Marilossian voted in favour of the French ratification of the European Union's Comprehensive Economic and Trade Agreement (CETA) with Canada.

In late 2019, Marilossian was one of 17 members of the Defense Committee who co-signed a letter to Prime Minister Édouard Philippe in which they warned that the 365 million euro ($406 million) sale of aerospace firm Groupe Latécoère to U.S. fund Searchlight Capital raised "questions about the preservation of know-how and France's defense industry base" and urged government intervention.

== See also ==
- 2017 French legislative election
