= Pierre Cardo =

French politician

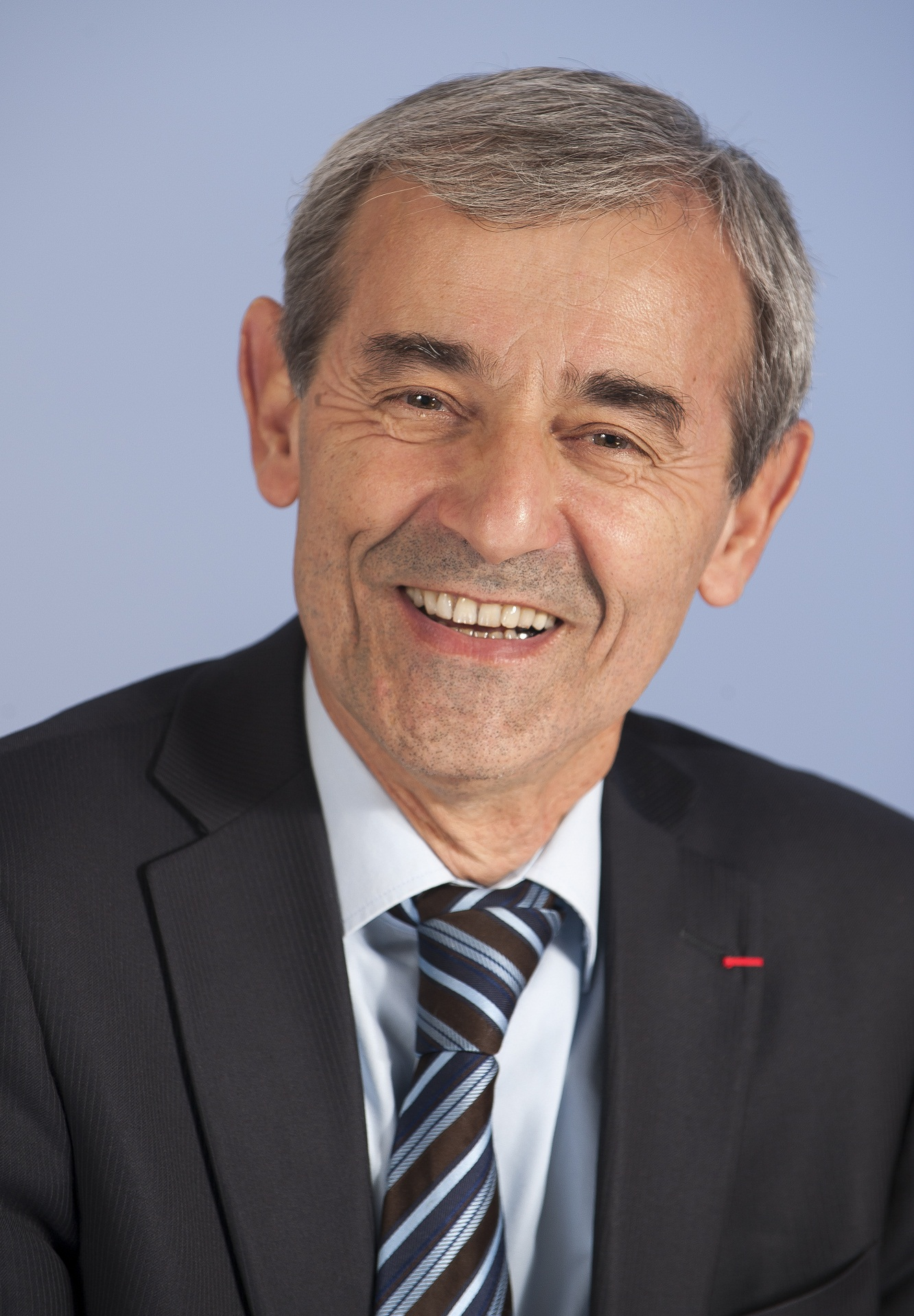
- Pierre Cardo

Member of the National Assembly for Yvelines's 7th constituency
- In office 2 June 1993 – 11 August 2010
- Preceded by: Jean Guigné
- Succeeded by: Arnaud Richard

Mayor of Chanteloup-les-Vignes
- In office 8 October 1983 – 3 November 2009

Personal details
- Born: 28 August 1949 (age 76) Toulon, France
- Party: UMP

Pierre Cardo (born 28 August 1949 in Toulon, Var) is a member of the National Assembly of France. He represents the Yvelines department, and is a member of the Union for a Popular Movement. As of 2010, he is president of Autorité de Régulation des Activités Ferroviaires.
