= Nadia Hai =

French politician

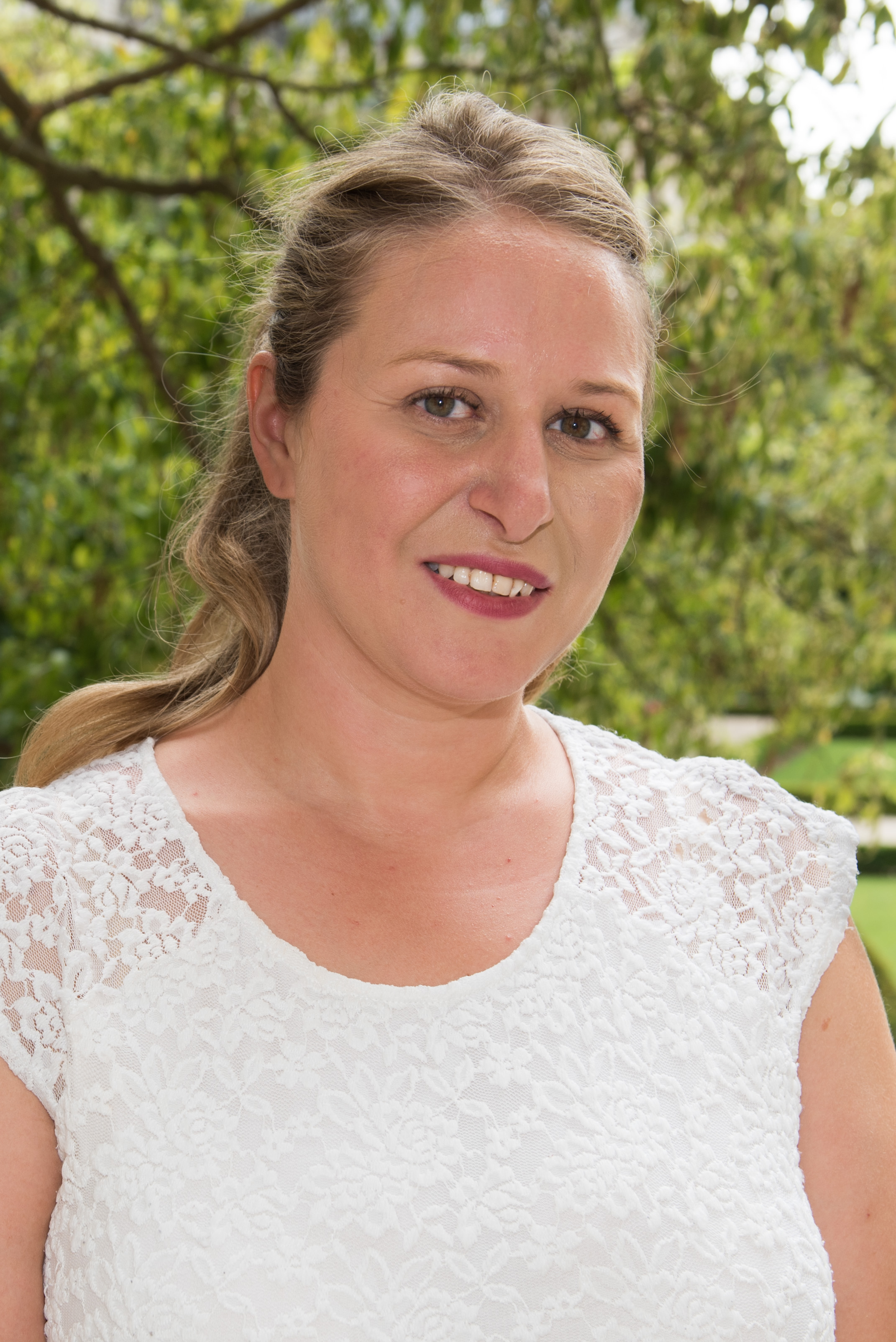
- Nadia Hai in 2017

Member of the National Assembly for Yvelines's 11th constituency
- In office 22 June 2022 – 9 June 2024
- Preceded by: Michèle de Vaucouleurs
- Succeeded by: Aurélien Rousseau

Minister Delegate to the City
- In office 6 July 2020 – 20 May 2022
- President: Emmanuel Macron
- Prime Minister: Jean Castex
- Preceded by: Julien Denormandie

Personal details
- Born: 8 March 1980 (age 46) Trappes, France
- Party: Renaissance

Nadia Hai (born 8 March 1980) is a French politician of La République En Marche! (LREM) who served as Secretary of State to Minister of Territorial Development Jacqueline Gourault in the government of Prime Minister Jean Castex from 2020 to 2022. She previously served as member of the French National Assembly from the 2017 elections, representing the department of Yvelines. She lives and works in Paris.

== Early career ==
Hai worked for 13 years for HSBC before joining Barclays as a wealth management advisor.

== Political career ==
In February 2017, Hai got involved in politics by participating in the creation of Femmes en marche avec Macron, a group in support of presidential candidate Emmanuel Macron.

In parliament, Hai serves on the Finance Committee. In that capacity, she was the parliament’s rapporteur on reform of the solidarity tax on wealth (ISF). From 2018 until 2019, Hai served as the only member of parliament on a Special Committee for the Evaluation of Capital Tax Reforms, including the ISF. In a 2019 vote, she challenged incumbent quaestor Laurianne Rossi but ultimately lost.

In addition to her committee assignments, Hai was a member of the French-Moroccan Parliamentary Friendship Group.

== Political positions ==
In July 2019, Hai voted in favor of the French ratification of the European Union’s Comprehensive Economic and Trade Agreement (CETA) with Canada.

== See also ==
- 2017 French legislative election
