= Paul A. Verdier =

Canadian psychologist (1918–1996)

Paul Andre Verdier (April 28, 1918 - July 3, 1996) was a licensed psychologist in California.

== Career ==
He was the first Vice President and one of the founders of the California Association of Marriage and Family Therapists (currently over 30,000 members). Verdier was a graduate of McGill University and held degrees in mechanical engineering and psychology. He was born in Europe and immigrated to Canada. He served in the Royal Canadian Navy during World War II and obtained the rank of Lieutenant Commander.

Dr. Verdier was associated with the National Research Council of Canada, the Defence Research and Development Canada, as a senior scientist with Litton Industries, and as a consultant to North American Aviation.

During the late 70s, he was extremely notable and popular and was on a number of talk shows in San Diego and Los Angeles commenting on the Patty Hearst kidnapping as well as a number of cult related news stories. This was due, in large part, to the timely release of his book Brainwashing and the Cults: An Exposé on Capturing the Human Mind .

He died in Los Angeles, July 3, 1996, from complications brought on by pneumonia and sclerosis in the upper body.

== Published works ==
- Basic Human Factors for Engineers (Exposition Press, 1960)
- Bio-psychology (Exposition Press, 1963)
- The Ergonomic Quotient (Church Press, 1971)
- Brainwashing and the Cults (Institute of Behavioral Conditioning, 1971)
