= Jean-Marie Baumel =

French sculptor

- Born: 2 November 1912; Marseille, France
- Died: 2 June 1978 (aged 65); Neuilly/Eure, France
- Known for: Sculpture

Jean-Marie Baumel was a French sculptor born in Marseille on 2 November 1912 and who died in Neuilly/Eure on 2 June 1978.

== Biography ==
Jean-Marie Baumel studied in Paris at the École des Beaux-Arts under Henri Bouchard. He exhibited at the Paris Salon des Artistes Français. He received a silver medal in 1935 for the composition "L'’Aumône", the Chenavard prize and a gold medal in 1936 for a sculpture in stone called "Idylle", the Puvis de Chavannes prize in 1965 for his work on the entrance to the Church of Notre-Dame de la Salette in Paris and, in 1978, the "médaille d’honneur" for a plaster statue depicting a standing nude. In 1937, he decorated one of the façades of the Vatican's pavilion at the Paris exhibition of 1937 and in 1939 he was commissioned to execute a statue of Claudius Gallet for the city of Annecy.

After the war he exhibited at the Salon d'Automne and the Salon de la Jeune Sculpture from 1959 to 1964. In 1950 he was commissioned to decorate the entrances to the Saint-Antoine tunnel in Marseille with two low-reliefs. In 1956 he worked on a "Monument à la République" in Agde, replacing a bronze fountain decoration melted down by the Germans in 1941 and completed a 1939-1945 war memorial for the city of Dieppe railway station. He also sculpted a composition covering a group of bathers for the seaside town of Bandol. He was commissioned to create two wooden cariatides for the Palace of Justice in Abidjan. He also produced several medallions for the French mint (Monnaie de Paris).

== Major works ==
Baumel's main works are:

=== "Tristesse" ===
The Paris École des Beaux-Arts keeps works by ex-pupils and holds this plaster bust by Baumel, his submission for the 1935 competition: "Tête d'expression"

=== Low-reliefs in Le Havre ===
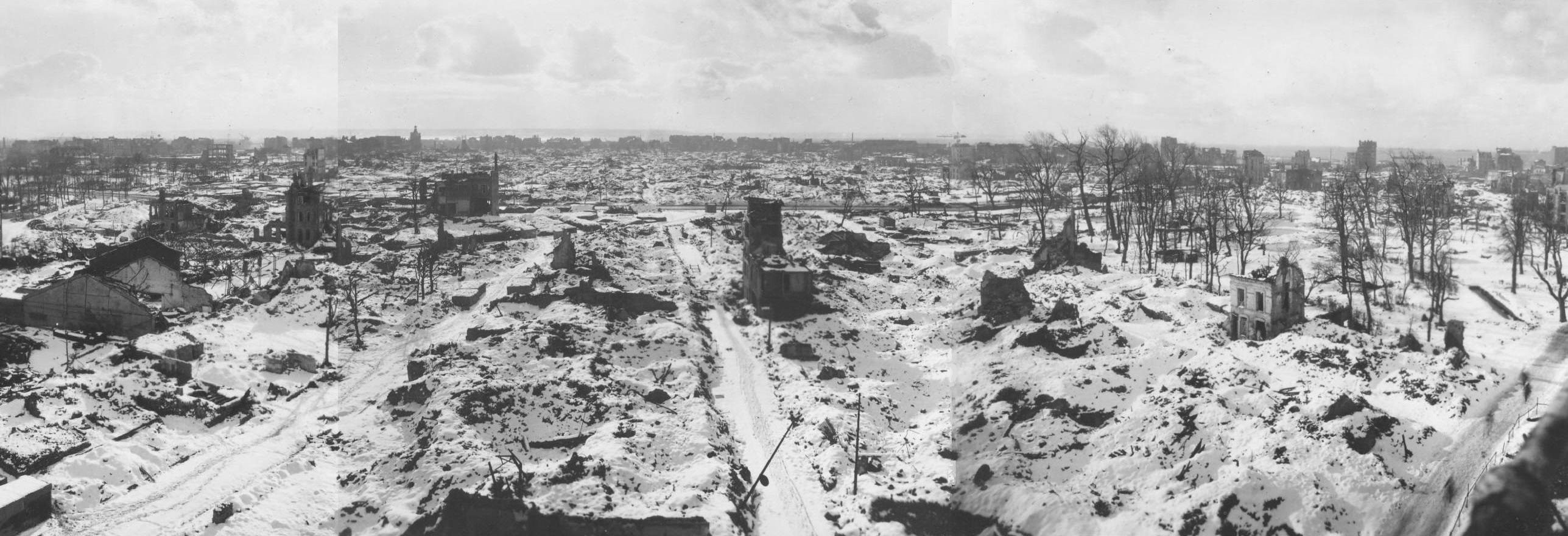
Le Havre in 1944-1945 showing the amount of bomb damage sustained

In Le Havre's avenue Foch, one of the many areas rebuilt by Auguste Perret after the war, when so much of the city was destroyed during bombing, the decision was made in 1953 to improve the look of the buildings by adding low-reliefs by various sculptors. Baumel and his wife Marthe Schwenck were commissioned to execute two of these low-reliefs, after submitting maquettes. The themes being Le Havre's historic contributions to painting and music; "La peinture", which depicts a woman with palette and brush and "la musique" which depicts a man playing a lyre. Around the reliefs are inscribed the names of the artists honoured, André Caplet, Pierre Beauvallet, Henri Woollett and Pierre Maumont, Raymond Lecourt, Othon Friesz, Georges Binet and Raoul Dufy. The addition of these low-reliefs was organised by the Coopérative de reconstruction François Ier.

=== "Maison de la Normandie" ===
This 1951 building in Le Havre's boulevard François Ier also has low-reliefs by Baumel. One depicts a Norman warrior and the other a woman wearing a bonnet both symbolising Normandy. The architects were Alexandre Franche, Boucher and Vernot and Henri Colboc.

=== Statues on the Pont Boieldieu in Rouen ===
This bridge was built in 1955 joining the rue Grand-Pont with the rue St Sever. At each end of the bridge are two monumental sculptures and two of these are by Baumel and date to 1956. One of the sculptures depicts the Rouen navigator and explorer Cavelier de La Salle leading an expedition to America and the second shows Normans heading to England in a drekar.

=== Bust of Claudius Gallet ===
This bust dates to 1939 and can be seen in Annecy's "Les Jardins de l'Europe". Gallet was senator of Haute-Savoie from 1920 to 1936 and served as the Minister of pensions from 1929 to 1930.

=== Embassy of France in Canberra ===
Baumel created a low-relief for the embassy building.

=== "Marseille et la mer Méditerranée" ===
Baumel executed two low-reliefs in cement in 1959 for each side of the Saint-Antoine tunnel of the A7 gate to the city of Marseille. One was entitled "Marseille et la mer Méditerranée".

=== Church of Notre-Dame de la Salette, Paris ===
For this church in Paris, Baumel executed a two-part low-relief for the entrance. In his composition, he depicts the "Our Lady of La Salette la to the left and two children on the right witnessing the Virgin's appearance. He also carved the "Stations of the Cross", a statue of St Joseph and "La Vierge de la Salette en pleurs" (the Virgin in tears). Baumel's sculptures are carved from walnut. The sculpture for the church's entrance won Baumel the Puvis de Chavannes prize in 1965.

=== Fountain in Agde ===
In 1908 a bronze sculpture in the fountain in Agde's place du Jeu de Ballon depicted a woman holding the French national flag with children at her feet. She was metaphorically protecting the French republic. In 1941 the Germans melted the sculpture down to reuse the metal and in 1956 Baumel created a replacement in stone.

=== Lycée de Cosne-Nevers-Plagny ===
For this school in Challuy Baumel created a limestone sculpture whose four sides represent a different season. A young man dancing amongst flowers depicts Spring, a young woman with wheat depicts Summer, another harvests grapes and depicts Autumn whilst a man hewing wood depicts winter.

=== Ronde-bosse in Davayé ===
For the Lycée de Davayé, Baumel created a sculpture of a naked youth and a horse. The work was part of the 1% artistic program, whereby 1% of the cost of a new school would be put aside to pay for a work of art for that school.

=== Dieppe Railway Station war memorial ===
Baumel created a memorial to those railway men who laid down their lives in the 1939-1945 war.
