= Amélie Verdier =

French civil servant (born 1979)

Directrice générale des finances publiques
- Incumbent
- Assumed office 4 March 2024
- Preceded by: Jérôme Fournel

Personal details
- Born: 1 July 1979 (age 46) Clichy, France
- Education: Lycée Henri-IV
- Alma mater: Paris 1 Panthéon-Sorbonne University; Sciences Po, ÉNA

Amélie Verdier (born 1 July 1979) is a French civil servant who has been serving as director general of public finances since 2024. From 2021 to 2024, she served as director general of the Agence régionale de santé of Île-de-France. From 2017 to 2021, she served as director of the budget. From 2014 to 2016, she served as secretary general of Greater Paris University Hospitals. Since 4 March 2024 she has headed the Direction générale des Finances publiques.
