= Jacques Baumel =

French politician (1918–2006)

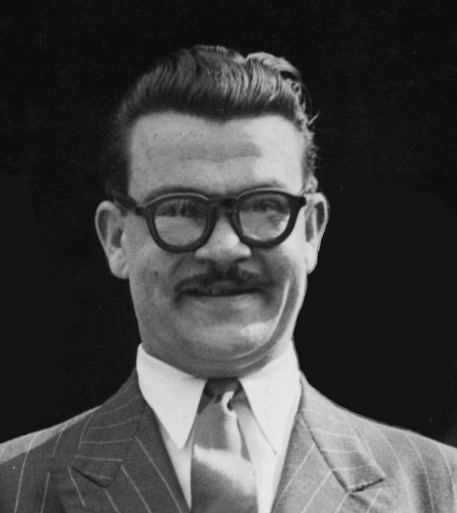
- Jacques Baumel in 1946

Mayor of Rueil-Malmaison
- In office 21 March 1971 – 18 June 2004
- Preceded by: Marcel Pourtout
- Succeeded by: Patrick Ollier

Member of the National Assembly for Hauts-de-Seine's 7th constituency
- In office 1967–2002
- Succeeded by: Patrick Ollier

Personal details
- Born: 6 March 1918 Marseille, France
- Died: 17 February 2006 (aged 87) Rueil-Malmaison, France
- Party: RPR
- Spouse: Louise Bachelot
- Education: Lycée Thiers

Jacques Baumel (French pronunciation: [ʒak bomɛl]; 6 March 1918 – 17 February 2006) was a French politician. He was born on 6 March 1918 in Marseille and died on 17 February 2006 in Rueil-Malmaison. He was a French Resistance fighter (under the aliases "Saint-Just", "Berneix" or "Rossini"), deputy in the National Assembly, a senator, an important leader of the Gaullist movement, and secretary of state and mayor of Rueil-Malmaison.

== Resistance fighter ==
After medical studies in France, Baumel took part in the French Resistance and directed the Combat resistance group in[Marseille. In 1943, he was secretary general of the Mouvements Unis de la Résistance (United movements of the Resistance) (MUR). In 1945, helped to found the Union démocratique et socialiste de la Résistance (UDSR). He was a member of the Provisional Consultative Assembly. In 1945, he was elected deputy of the National Assembly of Moselle to the First National Constituent Assembly, was elected in Creuse to the Second Assembly but defeated in the elections to the National Assembly of 1946. He chaired the parliamentary group of the UDSR. He participated in the development of Rassemblement du peuple français (Rally of the French People) (RPF) from its founding in 1947.

== Record of political longevity ==
As a senator from 1959 to 1967, he was one of the assistant secretaries general of the Union for the New Republic (UNR). He went to the United States and examined the campaign of John F. Kennedy in 1960. He became the general secretary of the Gaullist movement on 7 December 1962 after the success of the UNR in November, a position he held until 19 January 1968, when he was replaced by Robert Poujade. He was elected during the new elections to the National Assembly in 1967 and held a seat in Palais Bourbon until 2002. He was a member of the UniNR, of the Union for the Defence of the Republic (UDR) and Rally for the Republic (RPR).

== Mayor for 33 years ==
Baumel was secretary of state to the prime minister, Jacques Chaban-Delmas, from 20 June 1969 to 5 July 1972. He was mayor of Rueil-Malmaison, "a provincial town outside Paris" to use his words, from 1971 to 2004, at the origin of Rueil 2000 (now Rueil-sur-Seine). He practiced an active policy of twinning with many foreign cities (19 in all). His municipal policy promoted the establishment of head offices of important business, both French and foreign. The preschool system is particularly strong in his city. A library opened in 2002 that bears his name.

== Expert on parliamentary diplomacy ==
He chaired the general council of Hauts-de-Seine for nine years starting in 1970 (from 1970 to 1973 and from 1976 to 1982). Internationally, he represented the French Parliament in the Assembly of the Western European Union and the Inter-Parliamentary Union where he opposed all forms of totalitarianism.

He is buried in the village cemetery of Fourneville in Calvados. His wife, Louise Bachelot, was born on 11 September 1924 and died on 14 November 2013.

Baumel appeared as a witness in Patrick Pesnot's 2005 television documentary, La traversée du désert (Crossing the Desert).

== Publications ==
- Baumel, Jacques (1985). Une certaine idée de la France [A certain idea of France] (in French). éditions Vaugirard.
- Baumel, Jacques (1994). La France et sa Défense [France and Her Defence] (in French). éditions des Forges.
- Baumel, Jacques (1999). Résister, Histoire secrète des années d'occupation [Resistance Fighter, Secret History of the years of occupation] (in French). éditions Albin Michel. ISBN 978-2226108661.
- Baumel, Jacques (2001). De Gaulle, l'exil intérieur [De Gaulle, the Internal Exile] (in French). éditions Albin Michel. ISBN 978-2226125835.
- Baumel, Jacques (2004). La Liberté guidait nos pas [Liberty Guided our Steps] (in French). Plon. ISBN 978-2259199353.
- Baumel, Jacques; Delpla, François (2004). La Libération de la France [The Liberation of France] (in French). édition l'Archipel. ISBN 978-2841874217.
- Baumel, Jacques; Delpla, François (2006). Un tragique malentendu. De Gaulle et l'Algérie [A Tragic Misunderstanding. De Gaulle and Algeria] (in French). ISBN 978-2259204125.

== Achievements ==
- Officer of the Legion of Honour
- Compagnon de la Libération (Companion of the Liberation)
- Croix de guerre 1939–1945 (1939-1945 War Cross)
- French Resistance Medal
