= Réseau Ferré de France =

Former French railway infrastructure management company

Réseau ferré de France
- Logo from 2008-2014
- Company type: state-owned company
- Industry: Infrastructure & Tracks Proprietor, State Administrator
- Predecessor: SNCF
- Founded: 13 February 1997
- Defunct: December 31, 2014
- Successor: SNCF Réseau
- Headquarters: 92, avenue de France; 75013 Paris, France
- Area served: France
- Parent: Ministère du Transport

Réseau ferré de France (French pronunciation: [ʁezo fɛʁe də fʁɑ̃s], lit. 'French Rail Network', abbr. RFF) was a French company which owned and maintained the French national railway network from 1997 to 2014. The company was formed with the rail assets of SNCF in 1997. Afterwards, the trains were operated by the SNCF, the national railway company, but due to European Union Directive 91/440, the Government of France was required to separate train operations from the railway infrastructure. On 1 January 2015, RFF became SNCF Réseau, the operational assets of SNCF became SNCF Mobilités, and both groups were placed under the control of SNCF.

Unlike other infrastructure managers, RFF did not provide maintenance services or rail traffic control operations, which were both done by SNCF Infra on RFF's behalf. Furthermore, SNCF retained the ownership of stations. In September 2013, RFF had over €32 billion of debt.

== Overview ==
The RFF was constituted with SNCF's infrastructure assets, and debts were transferred from SNCF's books to RFF's. RFF was mainly a financial structure focusing on debt refinancing, and contracted the majority of its infrastructure management to SNCF. Signalling on RFF infrastructure was implemented and maintained by SNCF.

The creation of RFF was criticised because of the financial options chosen: RFF was subsidised by the French government in order to pay the interest on debt previously borne by the SNCF, which allowed SNCF to have a positive operating income and thus enabled competition to be opened.

== Control centres ==
In July 2013, RFF began a project to build 16 regional control centres, replacing over a thousand local signalling centres. The first regional control centre was built in Pagny-sur-Moselle.

== See also ==
- Autorité de Régulation des Activités Ferroviaires
- Gestionnaire d’Infrastructure Unifié
- Réseau Ferré National
- Grigny to Corbeil-Essonnes line
