= Notre-Dame-de-la-Salette, Paris =

Notre-Dame-de-la-Salette
- Église Notre-Dame-de-la-Salette
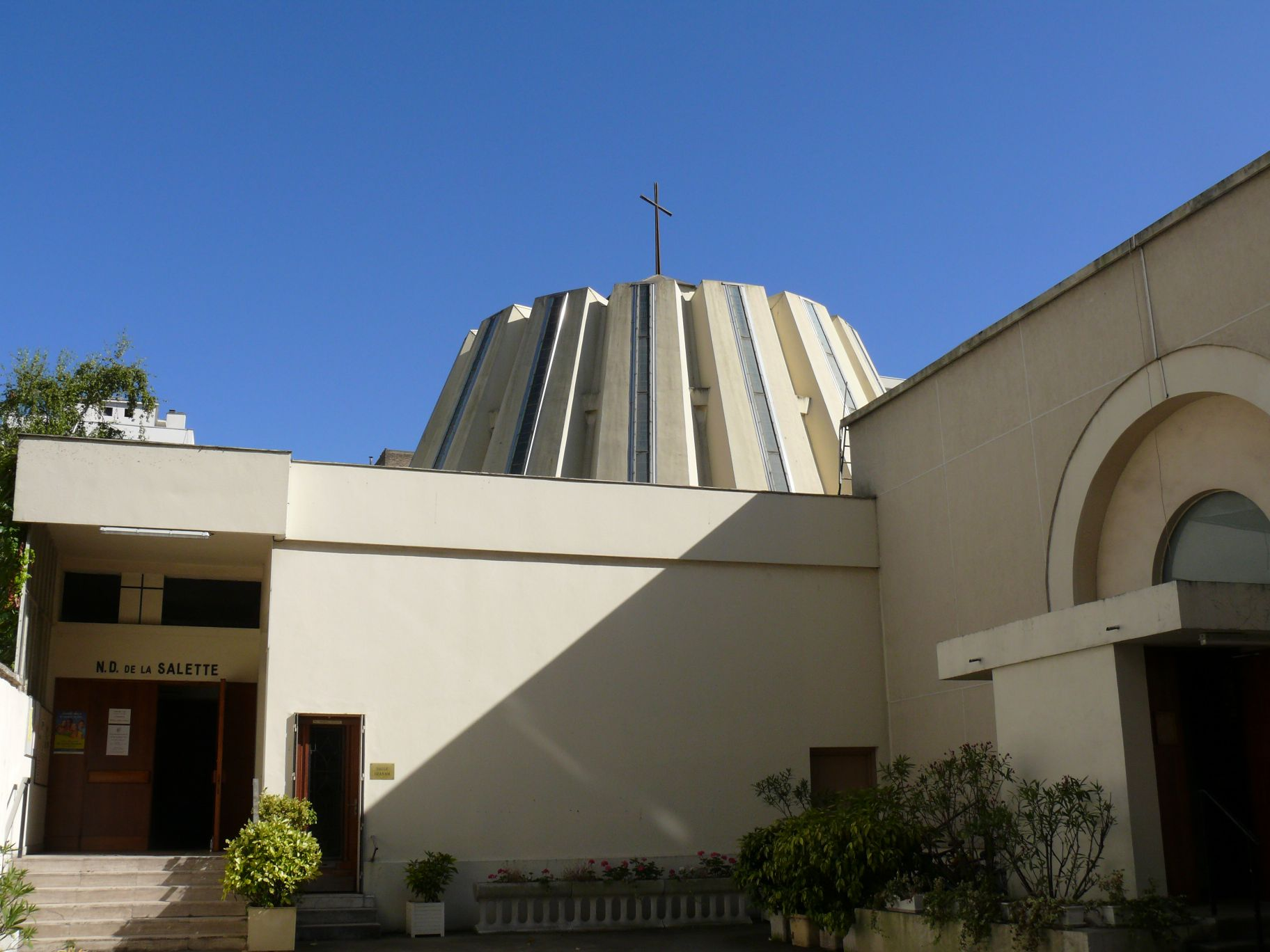

- 48.8339°N 2.3002°E
- Location: Paris, France
- Denomination: Roman Catholic

History
- Consecrated: 1965

Architecture
- Architect: Henri Colboc
- Architectural type: Church
- Style: Modern
- Groundbreaking: 1963
- Completed: 1965

Administration
- Province: Archdiocese of Paris

Notre-Dame-de-la-Salette (French pronunciation: [nɔtʁə dam də la salɛt]) is a Roman Catholic church located rue de Cronstadt in the 15th arrondissement of Paris. It is under the patronage of Our Lady of La Salette, particularly revered by the religious congregation of St. Vincent de Paul.

== History ==
The first chapel was built by the Brethren of Saint Vincent de Paul in 1858. The Catholic congregation founded in 1845 by Jean-Léon Le Prévost, Clement Myionnet and Maurice Maignen, had established an orphanage in this area. After the healing of three of their orphans, the clerics decided to build a chapel dedicated to the Sacred Hearts of Jesus and Mary. The chapel was enlarged in 1886 but finally razed in 1969. The orphanage was replaced by the "Foyer Le Prévost" which today houses young adults: it is a ten-storey building with an archway that one must pass through to get to the new church.

Construction began in 1963 and was completed in 1965 to meet the spiritual needs of a growing local population.

The new church was built according to the plans of architects Henri Colboc and Jean Dionis du Séjour. Being located on the site of abandoned underground quarries, the building had to be anchored by deep masonry to reach solid rock. It was consecrated by Bishop Brot, on September 19, 1965.

During the fourth quarter of 2015, from September to Christmas, the parish of Notre-Dame de la Salette celebrates the fiftieth anniversary of the dedication and construction of its church.

== Description ==
The modern design of the church is an example of the renewal inspired by the Second Vatican Council. Although located between rue de Dantzig and rue de Cronstadt, the edifice is not visible from any of these two streets. The main entrance is on the Cronstadt street. The double walnut door carved by Jean-Marie Baumel represents Christ and the Virgin of La Salette accompanied by the two children who witnessed the apparition. The creation of the portal earned Baumel the Puvis de Chavannes prize. The church also has a street entrance on rue de Dantzig. Once inside the perimeter of the church, one feels in a secluded haven far from the secular world and surrounding city.

On the outside, the church presents a round rough-concrete, openwork cone shaped like a Gugelhupf. Inside, its circular architecture ensures maximum visibility. The walls are devoid of any ornamentation. The vault is supported by sixteen pillars while sixteen stained glass windows, arranged obliquely, with geometric patterns created by Paul Martineau and Joseph Archepel capture maximum light rays. The colour gradations in the stained glass symbolize choir songs mounting up towards heaven. The bells are hidden in the crowning. The benches come from the old chapel of the Sacred Hearts of Jesus and Mary.

The oval-shaped altar consists of a massive travertine table, 20 cm deep, 2 m long and 80 cm wide with a total weight of 2 tons 1/2.
The church was labeled "Heritage of the twentieth century" on November 24, 2011.

A preexisting shrine, also called Notre-Dame de la Salette, can be accessed from the church. It shelters relics of the Holy Curé d'Ars, Clement Myionnet and Maurice Maignen and the tomb of the first priest of the congregation, Father Henri Planchat, who was shot during the Paris Commune and that of the revered Jean-Léon Le Prévost, the founder of the Congregation of the Religious of St. Vincent de Paul.
The brethren are still in charge of the parish today.

== The organ ==
The organ is a Danion-Gonzalez 1970 with two fifty-six-note keyboards and one thirty-two-note pedal; mechanical transmissions; thirteen organ stops (eleven actual).

The church of Notre-Dame de la Salette also offers a varied cultural programming of concerts.

== Gallery ==
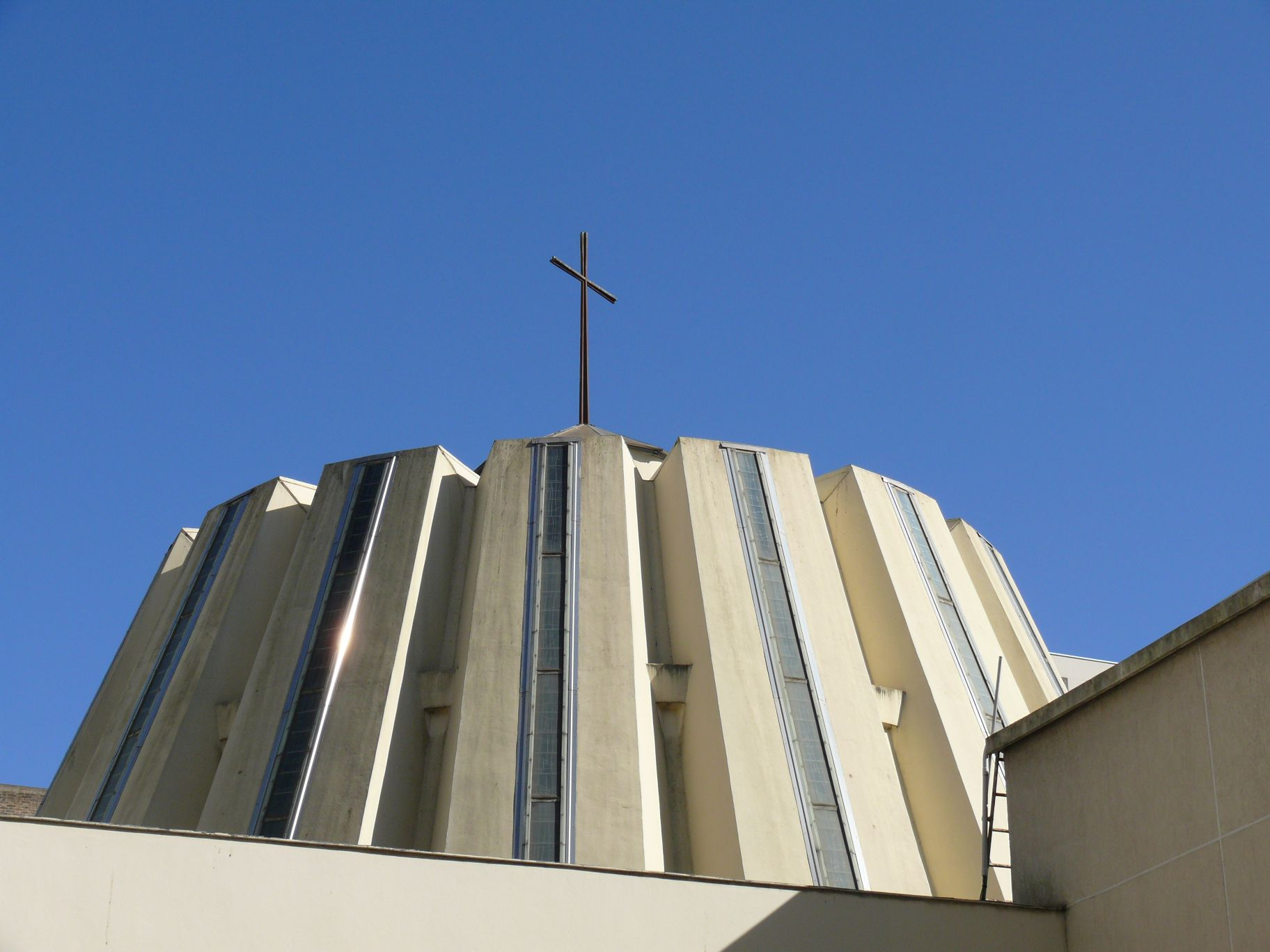
Dôme

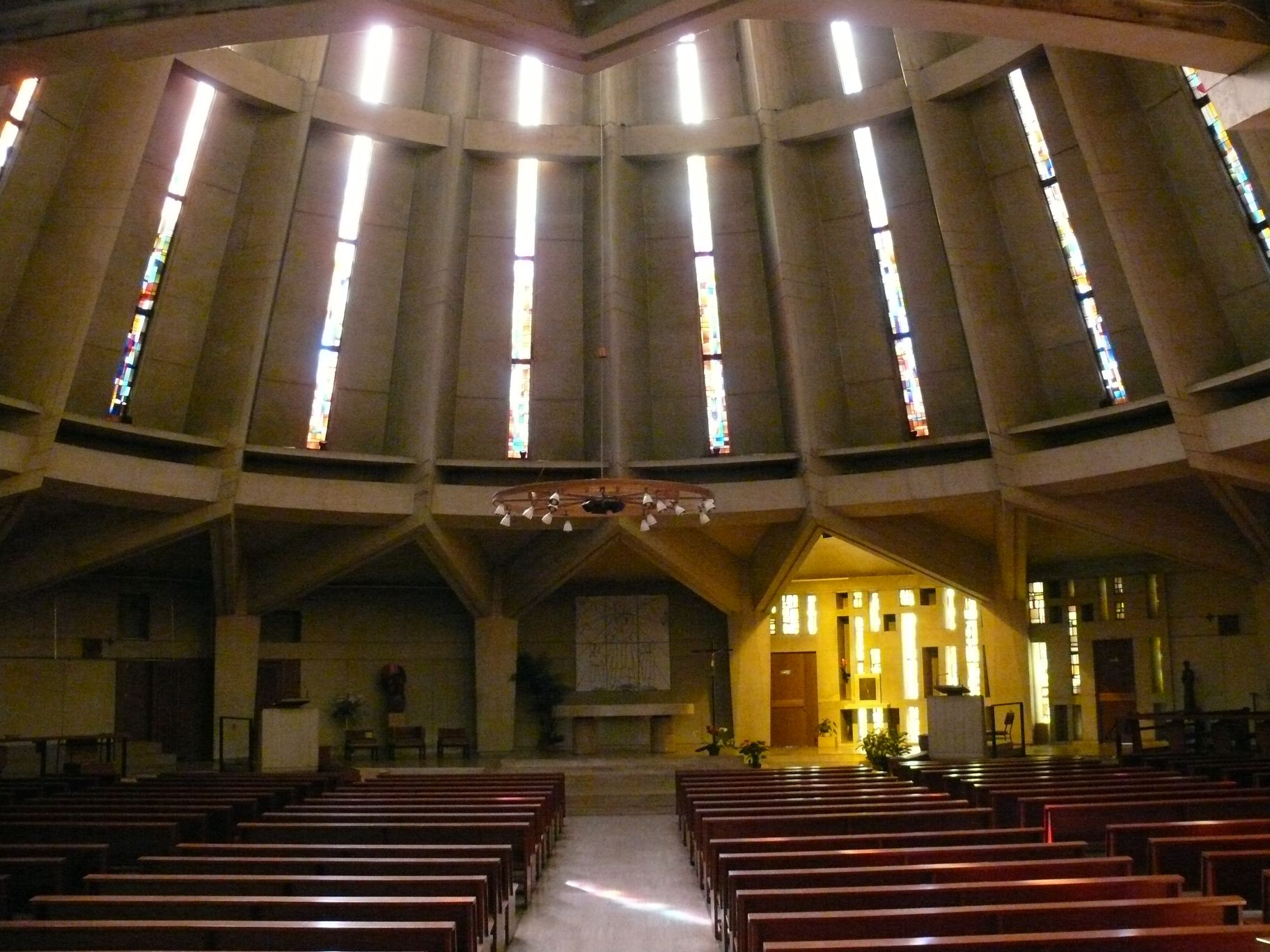
Interior

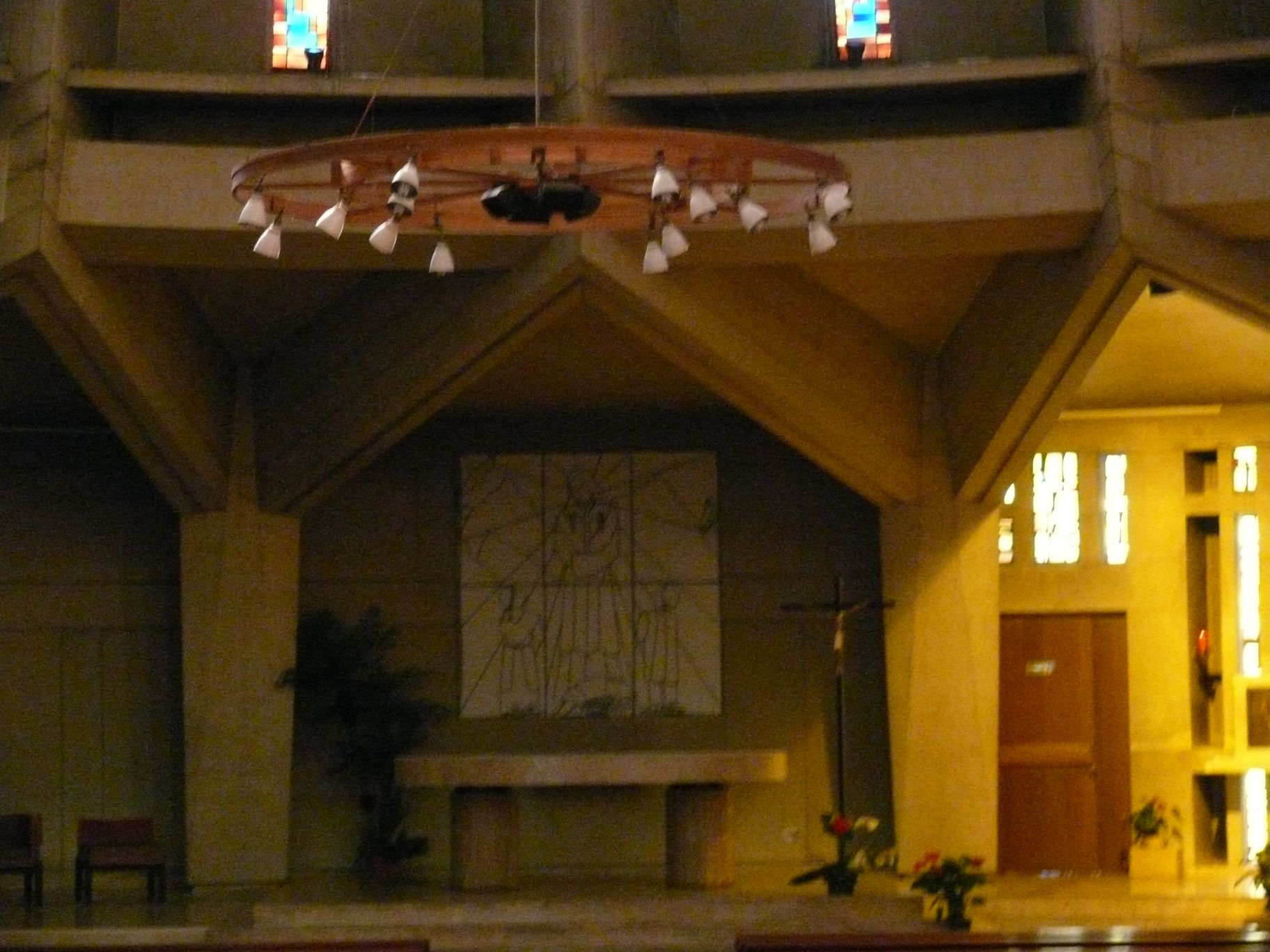
Interior

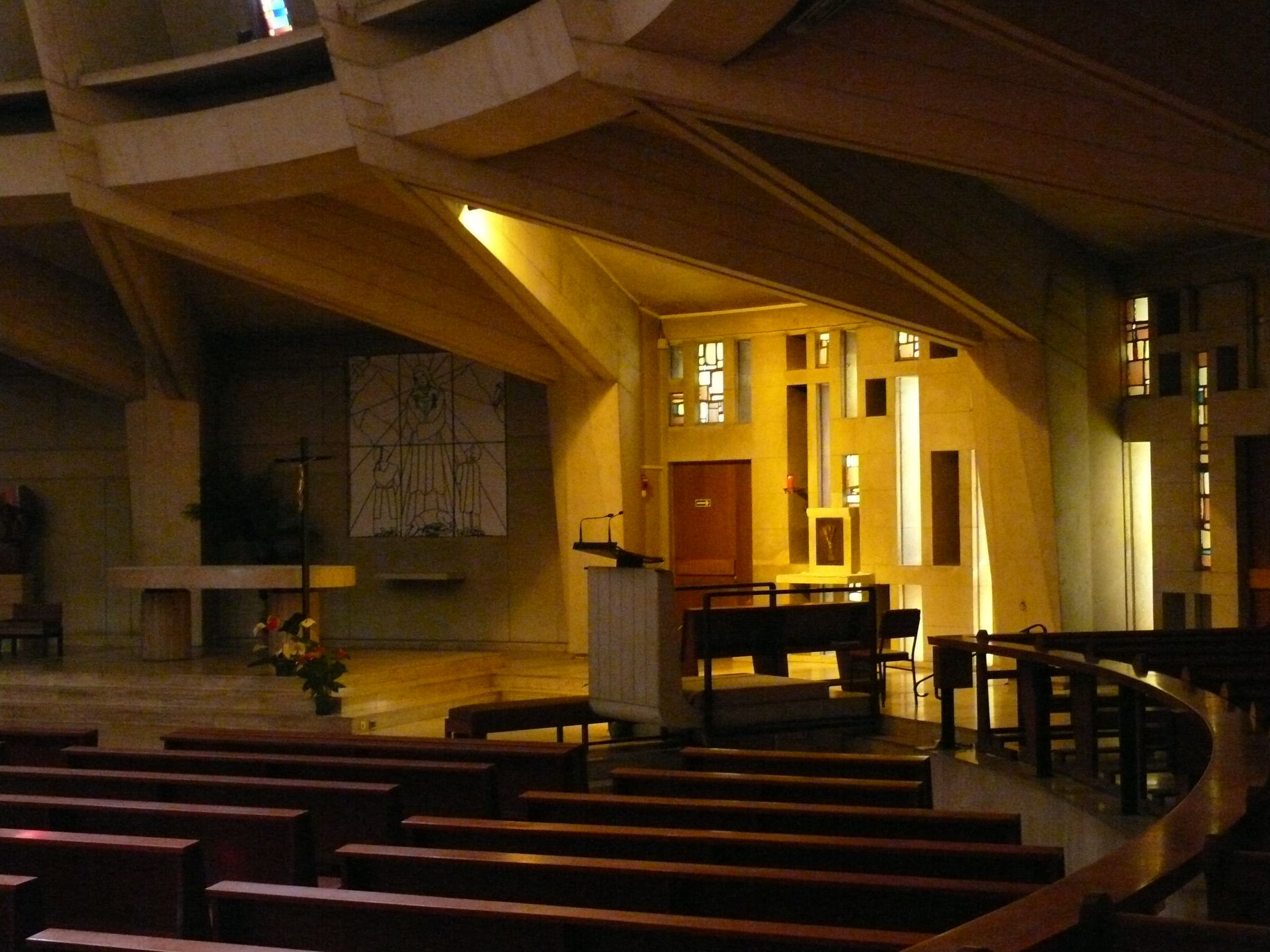
Interior

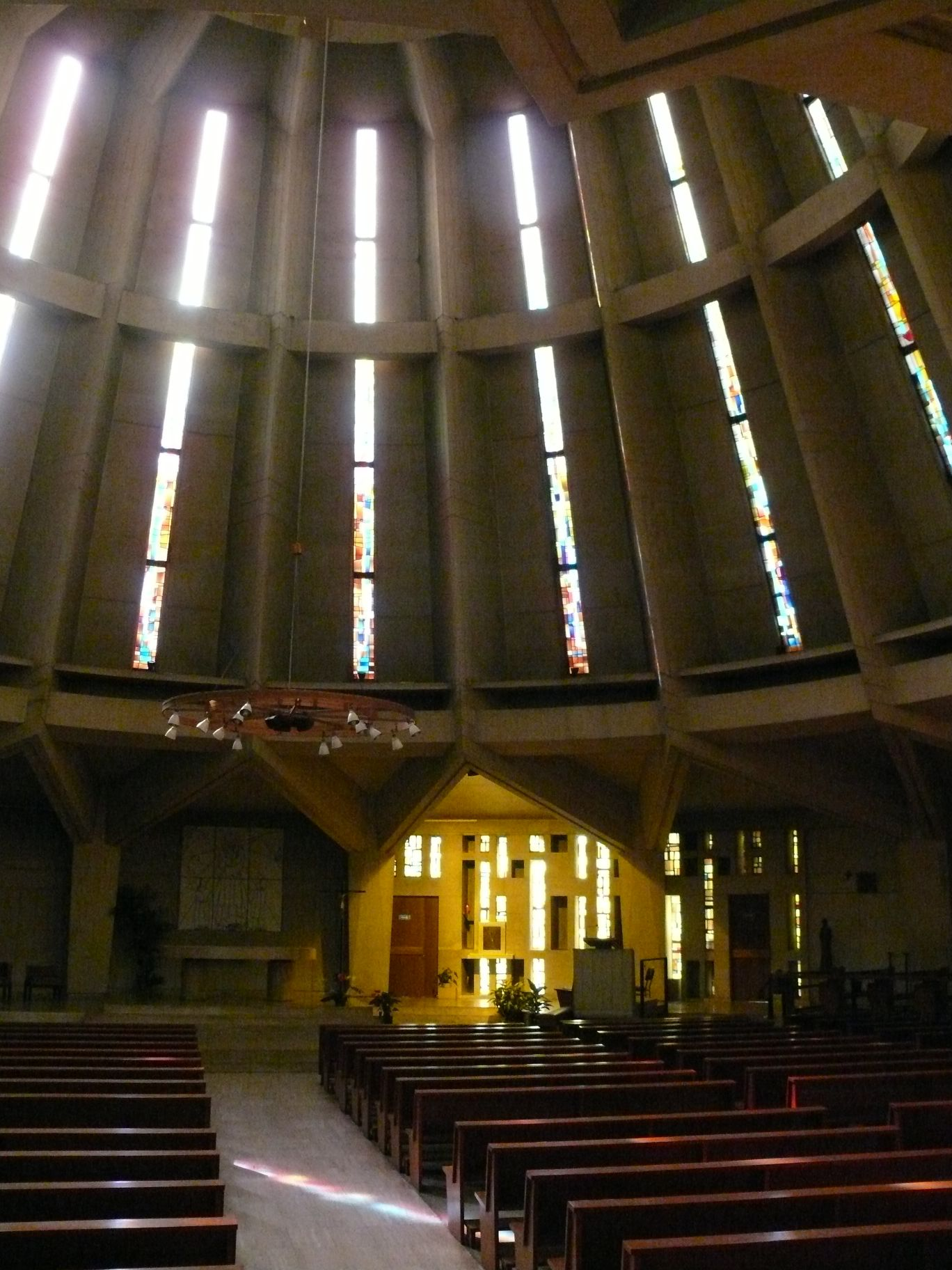
Interior

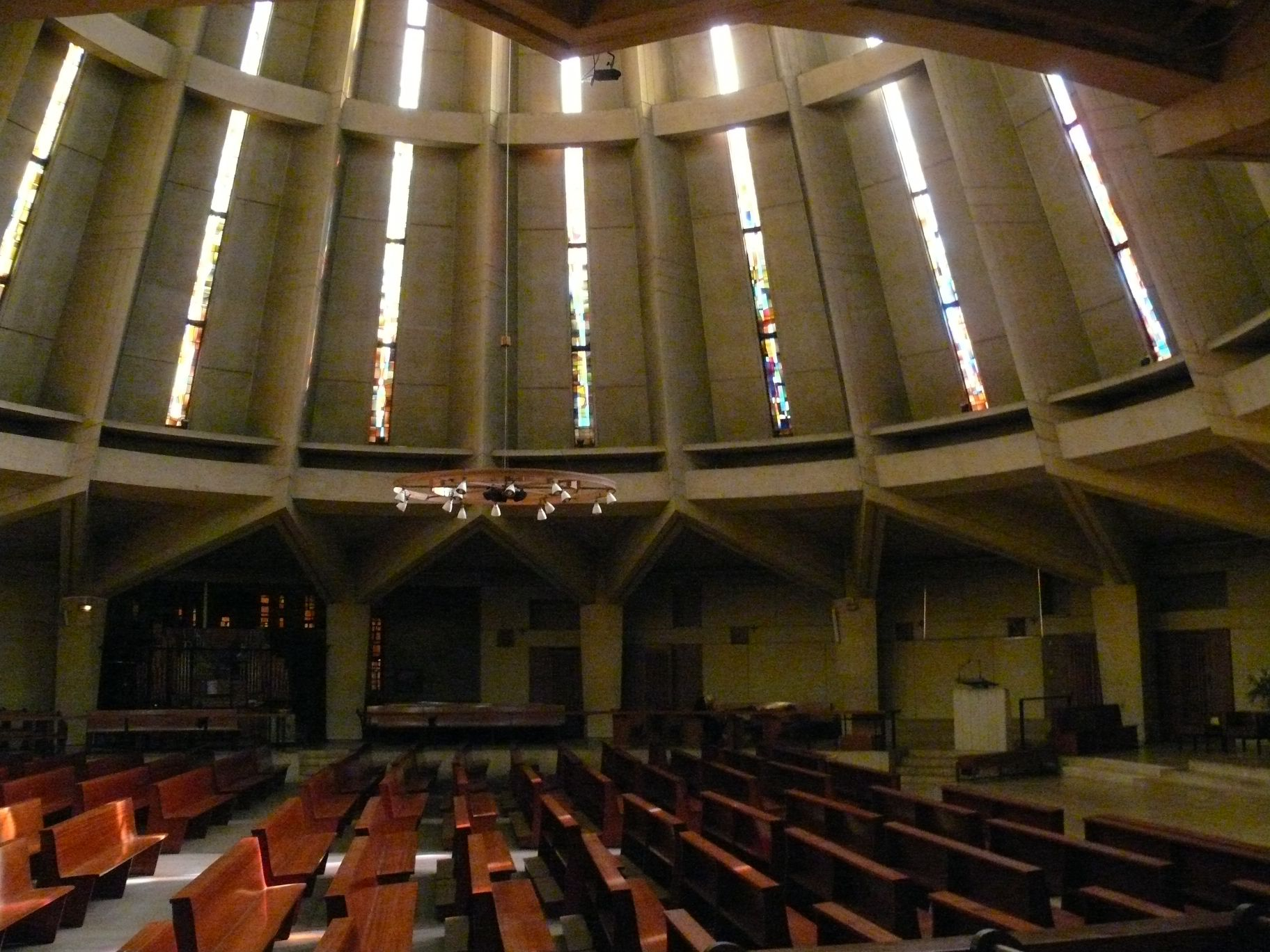
Interior

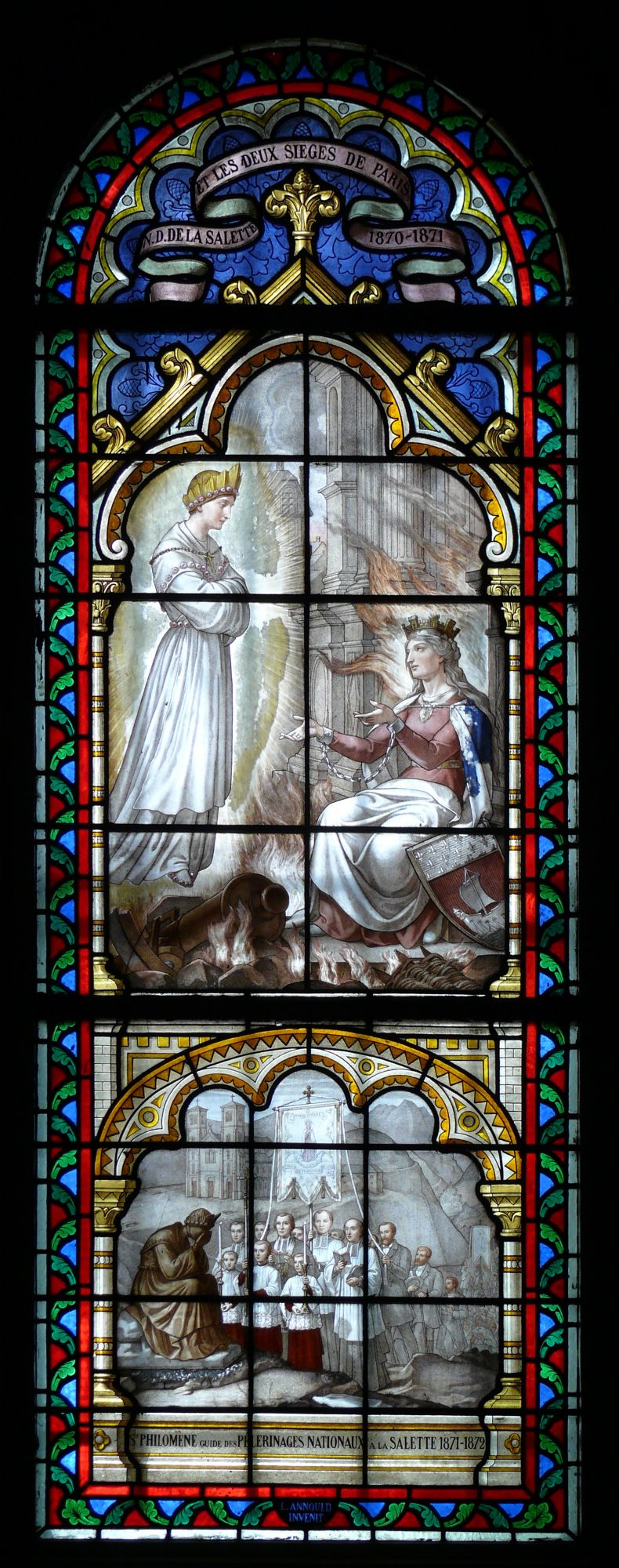
Stained glass

== Notes and references ==
The information on this page is partially translated from the equivalent page in French fr:Église Notre-Dame-de-la-Salette de Paris licensed under the Creative Commons/Attribution Sharealike . History of contributions can be checked here:.
