= Jérôme Fournel =

French civil servant (born 1967)

Chief of Staff to the Prime Minister
- In office 9 September 2024 – 4 December 2024
- Prime Minister: Michel Barnier
- Preceded by: Emmanuel Moulin
- Succeeded by: Nicolas Pernot

Personal details
- Born: 17 August 1967 (age 58)

Jérôme Laurent Fournel (born 17 August 1967) is a French civil servant. From September to December 2024, he served as chief of staff to prime minister Michel Barnier. From January to September 2024, he served as chief of staff to finance minister Bruno Le Maire. From 2019 to 2024, he served as director general of public finances. From 2017 to 2019, he served as chief of staff to public action and accounts minister Gérald Darmanin. From 2013 to 2017, he served as inspector general of finances. From 2007 to 2013, he served as director general of customs and indirect taxes.
