= Karl Olive =

French sports journalist and politician (born 1969)

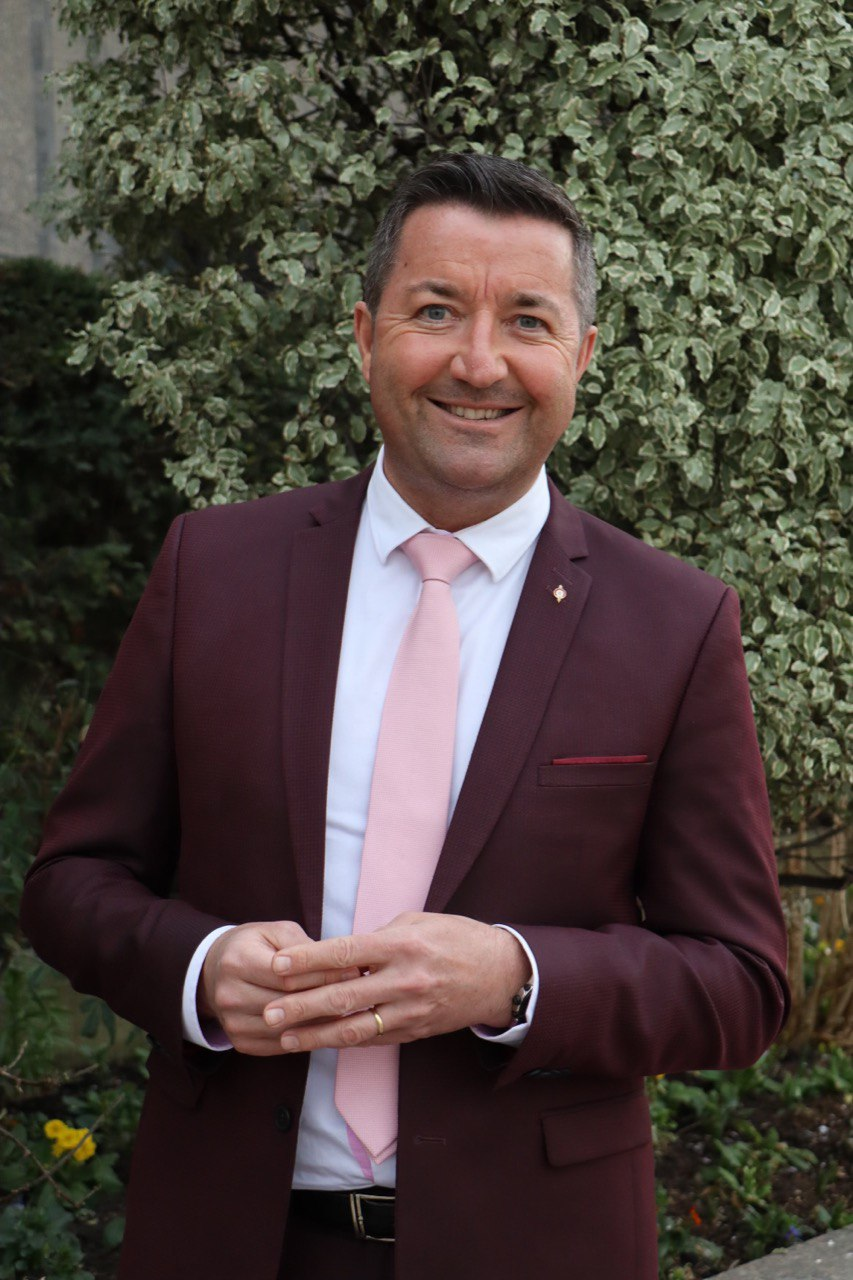
- Olive in 2022

Member of the National Assembly for Yvelines's 12th constituency
- Incumbent
- Assumed office 22 June 2022
- Preceded by: Florence Granjus

Mayor of Poissy
- In office 29 March 2014 – 3 July 2022
- Preceded by: Frédérik Bernard
- Succeeded by: Sandrine Berno Dos Santos

Personal details
- Born: Karl Franck Olive; 29 March 1969 (age 57) Saint-Germain-en-Laye, France
- Party: Renaissance (2022–present)
- Other political affiliations: Union for a Popular Movement (2010–2015); The Republicans (2015–2019); Independent (2019–2022)
- Relatives: Brigitte Olive (sister)
- Education: Paris 8 University Vincennes-Saint-Denis

Karl Franck Olive (French pronunciation: [kaʁl ɔliv]; born 29 March 1969) is a French sports journalist, television producer, entrepreneur and politician who has represented the 12th constituency of the Yvelines department in the National Assembly since 2022. He is a former member of The Republicans (LR), which he left in 2019 prior to joining La République En Marche! (LREM, now Renaissance) in 2022.

== Political career ==
Olive served as Mayor of Poissy from 2014 until his resignation in 2022 following his election to Parliament. In the National Assembly, he succeeded Florence Granjus who did not run for reelection, winning election as a deputy with 59.9% of the second-round vote. Olive has also held a seat in the Departmental Council of Yvelines since 2015 for the canton of Poissy.

Amid the first Yellow vests protests in 2018, Olive brought a group of mayors from his department, Yvelines, together with President Emmanuel Macron to explain to Macron how he needed to change.

== Personal life ==
Olive is the brother of former footballer Brigitte Henriques.

== Honours ==
- Knight of the Legion of Honour (2020)

== See also ==
- List of deputies of the 16th National Assembly of France
