= Bruno Millienne =

French politician

Member of the National Assembly for Yvelines's 9th constituency
- In office 21 June 2017 – 9 June 2024
- Preceded by: Jean-Marie Tétart
- Succeeded by: Dieynaba Diop

Member of the Regional Council of Île-de-France
- In office 13 December 2015 – 1 July 2021
- President: Valérie Pécresse

Personal details
- Born: 28 November 1959 (age 66) Argenteuil, France
- Party: MoDem

Bruno Millienne (born 28 November 1959) is a French politician of the Democratic Movement (MoDem) who represented the 9th constituency of the Yvelines department in the National Assembly from 2017 to 2024.

A sports journalist by occupation, Millienne worked for France Télévisions, Eurosport and Groupe M6 before he entered politics. He served as a municipal councillor in Jumeauville from 2014 to 2017 and a regional councillor of Île-de-France from 2015 to 2021. In parliament, he served on the Committee on Sustainable Development, Spatial and Regional Planning.

In 2025, Millienne was appointed communications adviser to Prime Mnister François Bayrou.
