= Yvelines's 8th constituency =

Constituency of the National Assembly of France

8th constituency of Yvelines
- inline Constituency of the National Assembly of France

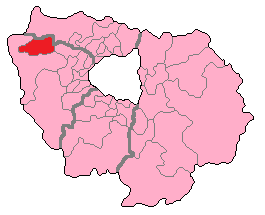
- Yvelines' 8th Constituency shown within Île-de-France
- Deputy: Benjamin Lucas; G.s
- Department: Yvelines
- Cantons: Limay · Mantes-la-Jolie · Mantes-la-Ville
- Registered voters: 71,086

The 8th constituency of Yvelines is a French legislative constituency in the Yvelines département.

== Description ==
The 8th constituency of Yvelines is located in the north of the department including the towns of Mantes-la-Jolie and Mantes-la-Ville south of the Seine and Limay on its northern bank. The two parts of the constituency are linked by two bridges across the Seine over the Île aux Dames. The three towns within the constituency form one urban area.

The constituency is one of only two in Yvelines held by the PS at the 2012 election. Historically it has always been something of a marginal seat swapping between right and left in line with the national trend.

== Historic Representation ==
Election	Member	Party
1967	Jacqueline Thome-Patenôtre	FGDS
1968	Jacqueline Thome-Patenôtre	FGDS
1973	Jacqueline Thome-Patenôtre	DVG
1978	Nicolas About	UDF
1981	Guy Malandain	PS
1986	Proportional representation – no election by constituency	
1988	Bernard Schreiner	PS
1993	Pierre Bédier	RPR
1997	Annette Peulvast-Bergeal	PS
2002	Pierre Bédier	UMP
2007	Pierre Bédier	UMP
2009	Cécile Dumoulin	UMP
2012	Françoise Descamps-Crosnier	PS
2017	Michel Vialay	LR
2022	Benjamin Lucas	G.s

== Election results ==
=== 2024 ===
Candidate	Party	Alliance	First round			Second round		
Candidate	Party	Alliance	Votes	%	+/–	Votes	%	+/–
Benjamin Lucas	G.s	NFP	20,416	44.92	+10.65	27,801	63.55	+7.14
Cyril Nauth	RN		14,076	30.97	+8.64	15,948	36.45	n/a
Alexis Costa	RE	ENS	6,436	14.16	-10.19			
Stephan Champagne	LR		2,592	5.70	-2.15			
Sabah El Asri	DVD		1,208	2.66	N/A			
Thierry Gonnot	LO		526	1.16	+0.17			
Nicolas Mangani	DIV		187	0.41	N/A			
Hugues Bovaere	REC		8	0.02	-3.48			
Léon Chevalier	DIV		3	0.01	N/A			
Valid votes			45,452	97.43	-0.60	43,749	93.87	-3.56
Blank votes			810	1.74	+0.24	2,238	4.80	+3.06
Null votes			389	0.83	+0.36	618	1.33	+0.50
Turnout			46,651	61.91	+20.66	46,605	61.84	-0.07
Abstentions			28,696	38.09	-20.66	28,760	38.16	0.07
Registered voters			75,347			75,365		
Source: Ministry of the Interior, Le Monde
Result						G.s HOLD		

=== 2022 ===
Legislative Election 2022: Yvelines's 8th constituency
Party	Candidate	Votes	%	±%
G.s (NUPÉS)	Benjamin Lucas	10,054	33.37	+6.73
LREM (Ensemble)	Edwige Hervieux	7,336	24.35	-0.52
RN	Cyril Nauth	6,729	22.33	+6.69
LR (UDC)	Michel Vialay	2,365	7.85	−9.34
REC	Anne Sicard	1,055	3.50	N/A
DIV	Bernard Kossoko	821	2.72	N/A
Others	N/A	1,772	5.88	
Turnout		30,132	41.25	−0.89
2nd round result
G.s (NUPÉS)	Benjamin Lucas	15,849	56.41	N/A
LREM (Ensemble)	Edwige Hervieux	12,246	43.59	−3.54
Turnout		28,095	40.48	+9.05
G.s gain from LR				

=== 2017 ===
Legislative Election 2017: Yvelines's 8th constituency
Party	Candidate	Votes	%	±%
LREM	Khadija Moudnib	7,744	24.87	
LR	Michel Vialay	5,351	17.19	
FN	François Simeoni	4,868	15.64	
LFI	Romain Carbonne	3,997	12.84	
PS	Françoise Descamps-Crosnier	2,904	9.33	
PCF	Eric Roulot	1,391	4.47	
DVD	Stéphane Hazan	1,316	4.23	
DIV	Abdelmajid Eddaikhane	776	2.49	
DLF	Michael Taverne	658	2.11	
Others	N/A	2,127		
Turnout		31,132	42.14	
2nd round result
LR	Michel Vialay	12,276	52.87	
LREM	Khadija Moudnib	10,945	47.13	
Turnout		23,221	31.43	
LR gain from PS				

=== 2012 ===
Legislative Election 2012: Yvelines's 8th constituency
Party	Candidate	Votes	%	±%
PS	Françoise Descamps-Crosnier	13,395	35.78	
UMP	Cécile Dumoulin	11,441	30.56	
FN	Patricia Cote	6,356	16.98	
FG	Eric Roulot	3,500	9.35	
EELV	Joël Mariojouls	832	2.22	
Others	N/A	1,914		
Turnout		37,987	53.43	
2nd round result
PS	Françoise Descamps-Crosnier	19,317	52.99	
UMP	Cécile Dumoulin	17,138	47.01	
Turnout		37,592	52.88	
PS gain from UMP				

=== 2007 ===
Legislative Election 2007: Yvelines's 8th constituency
Party	Candidate	Votes	%	±%
UMP	Pierre Bédier	15,417	41.11	
PS	Françoise Descamps-Crosnier	8,787	23.43	
PCF	Jacques Saint-Amaux	4,225	11.27	
FN	Jean-Claude Varanne	2,419	6.45	
MoDem	Aziz Senni	2,338	6.23	
MPF	Philippe Cadoux	921	2.46	
DVE	Marcel Bednar	806	2.15	
Others	N/A	2,592		
Turnout		38,348	56.95	
2nd round result
UMP	Pierre Bédier	17,860	50.67	
PS	Françoise Descamps-Crosnier	17,390	49.33	
Turnout		36,707	54.52	
UMP hold				

=== 2002 ===
Legislative Election 2002: Yvelines's 8th constituency
Party	Candidate	Votes	%	±%
UMP	Pierre Bédier	15,950	42.48	
PS	Annette Peulvast-Bergeal	9,207	24.52	
FN	Hèlène D'Andre	6,106	16.26	
PCF	Jacques Saint-Amaux	2,520	6.71	
Others	N/A	3,766		
Turnout		38,172	64.27	
2nd round result
UMP	Pierre Bédier	20,074	60.05	
PS	Annette Peulvast-Bergeal	13,353	39.95	
Turnout		35,011	58.95	
UMP gain from PS				

=== 1997 ===
Legislative Election 1997: Yvelines's 8th constituency
Party	Candidate	Votes	%	±%
FN	Marie-Caroline Le Pen	11,197	28.48	
RPR	Pierre Bédier	10,372	26.38	
PS	Annette Peulvast-Bergeal	9,656	24.56	
PCF	Jacques Saint-Amaux	3,853	9.80	
GE	Bernard Moscodier	1,745	4.44	
LO	Daniel Benard	880	2.24	
Others	N/A	1,608		
Turnout		40,612	69.93	
2nd round result
PS	Annette Peulvast-Bergeal	17,321	40.29	
RPR	Pierre Bédier	15,313	35.62	
FN	Marie-Caroline Le Pen	10,357	24.09	
Turnout		44,066	75.89	
PS gain from RPR				

== Sources ==
Official results of French elections from 2002: "Résultats électoraux officiels en France" (in French).
