= Florence Granjus =

French politician (born 1962)

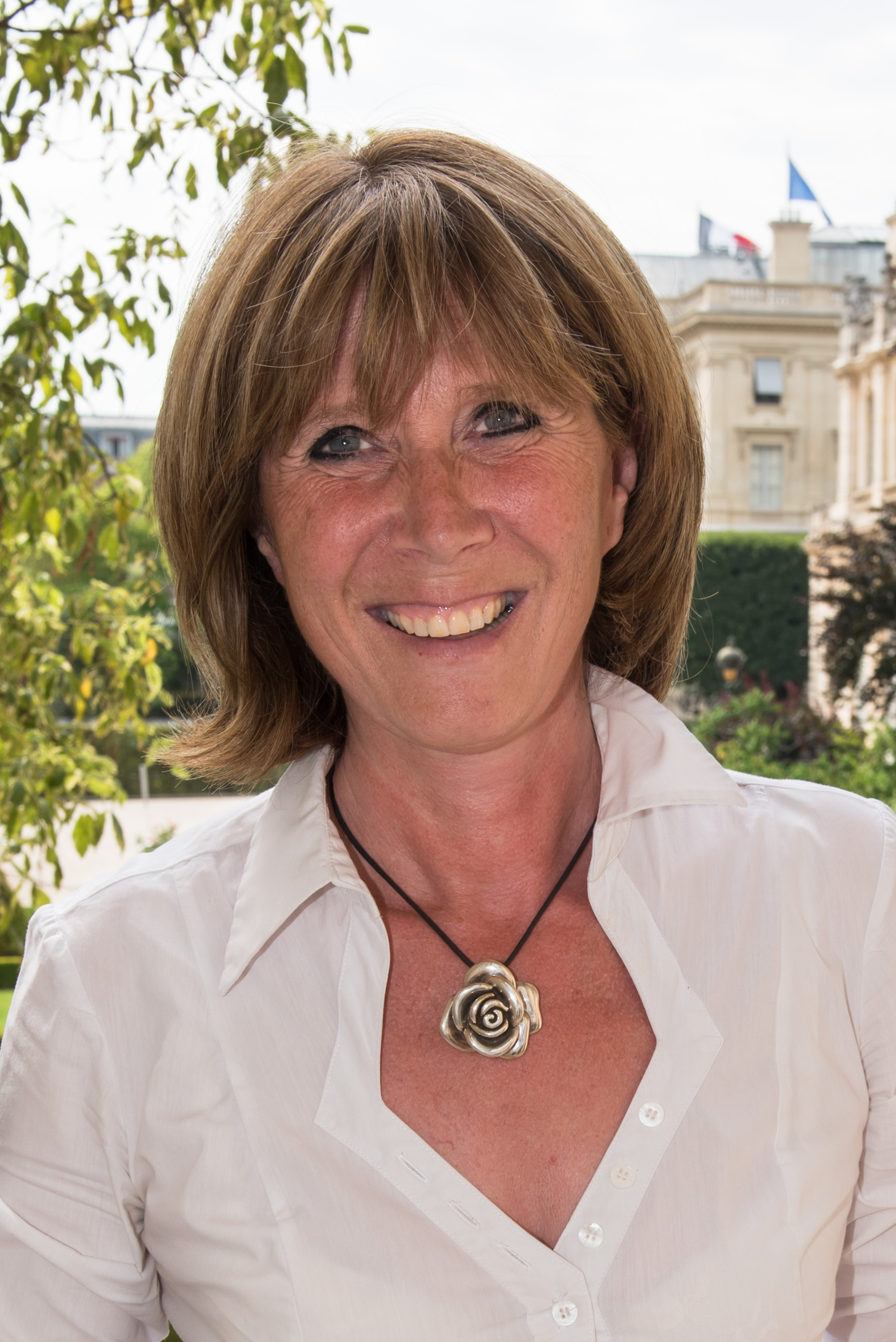

Member of the National Assembly for Yvelines's 12th constituency
- In office 21 June 2017 – 21 June 2022
- Preceded by: David Douillet
- Succeeded by: Karl Olive

Personal details
- Born: 17 May 1962 (age 63) Nanterre, France
- Party: La République En Marche!

Florence Granjus (born 17 May 1962) is a French politician of La République En Marche! (LREM) who represented the 12th constituency of the Yvelines department in the National Assembly from 2017 to 2022.

== Biography ==
On 18 June 2017, during the second round of the legislative elections, she came first against David Douillet with 56.63% of the votes cast. Before getting elected to the French National Assembly, Florence Granjus worked in the employment sector at the ANPE and later at Pôle emploi.

Granjus has been an advocate for gender equality. In November 2017 she launched a contest between primary schools in her constituency, the subject being equality between boys and girls. Her most significant political commitment being employment, she is quoted saying that it "is the identity of an individual".

She dismissed her two parliamentary staff in June 2018. They file a complaint against her for harassment.

== See also ==
- 2017 French legislative election
