= Carrières-sous-Poissy =

- Commune
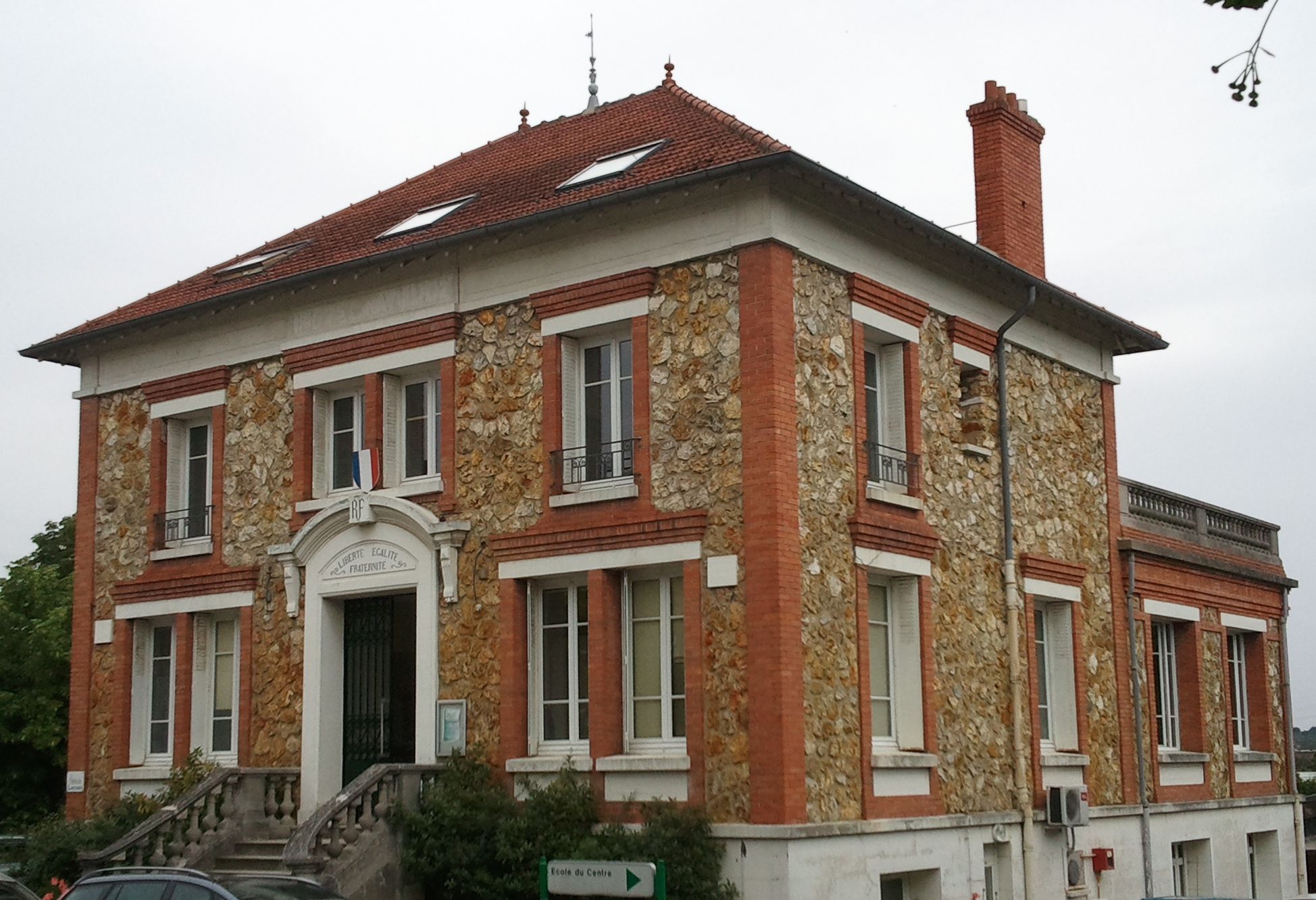
- The old town hall

- Coat of arms
- Location of Carrières-sous-Poissy
- Location within France Location within Île-de-France (region)
- Coordinates: 48°56′55″N 2°02′22″E
- Country: France
- Region: Île-de-France
- Department: Yvelines
- Arrondissement: Saint-Germain-en-Laye
- Canton: Poissy
- Intercommunality: CU Grand Paris Seine et Oise

Government
  - Mayor (2020–2026): Eddie Ait
- Area^{1}: 7.19 km^{2} (2.78 sq mi)
- Elevation: 33 m (108 ft)
- Highest elevation: 44 m (144 ft)
- Lowest elevation: 17 m (56 ft)
- Population (2023): 20,825
  - Density: 2,900/km^{2} (7,500/sq mi)
- Time zone: UTC+01:00 (CET)
  - Summer (DST): UTC+02:00 (CEST)
- INSEE/Postal code: 78123 /78955
- ^{1} French Land Register data, which excludes lakes, ponds, glaciers > 1 km^{2} (0.386 sq mi or 247 acres) and river estuaries.

Carrières-sous-Poissy (French: [kaʁjɛʁ su pwasi]) is a commune in the Yvelines department in the Île-de-France region in north-central France. The town sits on the bank of the Seine River, directly opposite the commune of Poissy. Notable landmarks in Carrières-sous-Poissy include the Château Champfleury, the Château Vanderbilt and St. Joseph's Church.

== Demographics ==
Historical population

Year	Pop.	±% p.a.
1793	371	—
1800	378	+0.27%
1806	451	+2.99%
1821	440	−0.16%
1831	497	+1.23%
1836	497	+0.00%
1841	503	+0.24%
1846	558	+2.10%
1851	500	−2.17%
1856	490	−0.40%
1861	530	+1.58%
1866	565	+1.29%
1872	612	+1.34%
1876	612	+0.00%
1881	724	+3.42%
1886	810	+2.27%
1891	783	−0.68%
1896	823	+1.00%
1901	973	+3.41%

Year	Pop.	±% p.a.
1906	1,130	+3.04%
1911	1,296	+2.78%
1921	1,392	+0.72%
1926	1,696	+4.03%
1931	2,129	+4.65%
1936	2,136	+0.07%
1946	2,119	−0.08%
1954	2,444	+1.80%
1962	4,222	+7.07%
1968	6,054	+6.19%
1975	10,324	+7.92%
1982	10,244	−0.11%
1990	11,353	+1.29%
1999	13,472	+1.92%
2007	13,976	+0.46%
2012	14,943	+1.35%
2017	16,212	+1.64%
2023	20,825	+4.26%

Source: EHESS and INSEE (1968-2023)

== See also ==
- Communes of the Yvelines department
