= Yvelines's 12th constituency =

Constituency of the National Assembly of France

12th constituency of Yvelines
- inline Constituency of the National Assembly of France

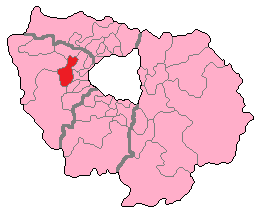
- Yvelines' 12th Constituency shown within Île-de-France
- Deputy: Karl Olive; RE
- Department: Yvelines
- Cantons: Poissy-Sud, Montfort-l'Amaury (part), Plaisir (part), Poissy-Nord (part)
- Registered voters: 66,387

The 12th constituency of Yvelines is a French legislative constituency in the Yvelines département.

== Description ==
The 12th constituency of Yvelines lies in the centre of the ward and is formed of the very western fringes of the Parisian suburbs around the town of Poissy.

The seat has returned conservative deputies to the National Assembly in every election since 1988. In 2009, Jacques Masdeu-Arus was replaced by his substitute David Douillet upon his appointment to the Constitutional Council. David Douillet was himself replaced by Joël Regnault in 2011 after having been appointed to serve in the government of François Fillon.

== Historic Representation ==
Election	Member	Party
1986	Proportional representation – no election by constituency	
1988	Jacques Masdeu-Arus	RPR
1993	Jacques Masdeu-Arus	RPR
1997	Jacques Masdeu-Arus	RPR
2002	Jacques Masdeu-Arus	UMP
2007	Jacques Masdeu-Arus	UMP
2009	David Douillet	UMP
2011	Joël Regnault	UMP
2012	David Douillet	UMP
2017	Florence Granjus	LREM
2022	Karl Olive	RE

== Election results ==
=== 2024 ===
Candidate	Party	Alliance	First round			Second round		
Candidate	Party	Alliance	Votes	%	+/–	Votes	%	+/–
Karl Olive	RE	ENS	20,610	40.75	+1.90	22,452	45.07	-14.87
Christophe Massieux	LÉ	NFP	15,333	30.32	+6.22	15,375	30.86	-9.20
Jean-Louis Mettelet	RN		12,585	24.88	+12.72	11,993	24.07	n/a
Bruno Jay	REC		743	1.47	-4.35			
Jean-Pierre Mercier	LO		537	1.06	+0.12			
Patrick Scieller	DIV		400	0.79	N/A			
Diabé Kamara	DIV		369	0.73	N/A			
Valid votes			50,577	97.89	-0.59	49,820	98.16	+0.27
Blank votes			820	1.59	+0.44	728	1.43	-0.16
Null votes			268	0.52	+0.15	208	0.41	-0.11
Turnout			51,665	71.42	+19.90	50,756	70.15	-1.27
Abstentions			20,675	28.58	-19.90	21,597	29.85	+1.28
Registered voters			72,340			72,353		
Source: Ministry of the Interior, Le Monde
Result						REN HOLD		

=== 2022 ===
Legislative Election 2022: Yvelines's 12th constituency
Party	Candidate	Votes	%	±%
LREM (Ensemble)	Karl Olive	14,028	38.85	-2.70
EELV (NUPÉS)	Edwin Legris	8,704	24.10	+6.43
RN	Jean-Louis Mettelet	4,393	12.16	+5.81
LR (UDC)	François Moutot	2,700	7.48	−19.81
REC	Savine Clement	2,100	5.82	N/A
DVE	Dimitri Carbonnelle	1,445	4.00	N/A
DVE	Isabelle Fourniere	1,261	3.49	N/A
Others	N/A	1,481	4.10	
Turnout		36,112	51.52	−0.22
2nd round result
LREM (Ensemble)	Karl Olive	20,069	59.94	+3.31
EELV (NUPÉS)	Edwin Legris	13,414	40.06	N/A
Turnout		33,483	50.21	+8.03
LREM hold				

=== 2017 ===
Legislative Election 2017: Yvelines's 12th constituency
Party	Candidate	Votes	%	±%
LREM	Florence Granjus	14,835	41.55	
LR	David Douillet	9,744	27.29	
LFI	Antoine Baro	3,536	9.90	
FN	Jean-Luc Gallais	2,266	6.35	
PS	Marie-Noëlle Bas	1,731	4.85	
EELV	Patricia Charton	1,043	2.92	
DLF	Fabian Metais	732	2.05	
Others	N/A	1,816		
Turnout		35,703	51.74	
2nd round result
LREM	Florence Granjus	16,484	56.63	
LR	David Douillet	12,625	43.37	
Turnout		29,109	42.18	
LREM gain from LR				

=== 2012 ===
Legislative Election 2012: Yvelines's 12th constituency
Party	Candidate	Votes	%	±%
UMP	David Douillet	16,244	41.69	
PS	Frédérik Bernard	13,240	33.98	
FN	Bernard Huet	3,885	9.97	
EELV	Sophie Renard	2,220	5.70	
FG	Michèle Valladon	1,666	4.28	
Others	N/A	1,708		
Turnout		39,435	59.40	
2nd round result
UMP	David Douillet	20,719	54.59	
PS	Frédérik Bernard	17,237	45.41	
Turnout		39,052	58.82	
UMP hold				

=== 2007 ===
Legislative Election 2007: Yvelines's 12th constituency
Party	Candidate	Votes	%	±%
UMP	Jacques Masdeu-Arus	17,362	41.91	
PS	Eddit Ait	8,933	21.56	
MoDem	Richard Bertrand	5,234	12.63	
FN	Karine Puech	1,580	3.81	
LV	Elisabeth Kleiber	1,429	3.45	
NM	Bernard Biron	1,400	3.38	
Far left	Lydia Chenal	1,159	2.80	
PCF	Hegera Ben-Salah	833	2.01	
Others	N/A	3,499		
Turnout		42,212	58.95	
2nd round result
UMP	Jacques Masdeu-Arus	19,321	52.32	
PS	Eddit Ait	17,610	47.68	
Turnout		38,807	54.20	
UMP hold				

=== 2002 ===
Legislative Election 2002: Yvelines's 12th constituency
Party	Candidate	Votes	%	±%
UMP	Jacques Masdeu-Arus	20,483	48.69	
LV	Alain Dorange	12,048	28.64	
FN	Jean-Louis Renault	4,222	10.04	
PCF	Gerard Senevat	1,245	2.96	
DVE	Herve Poggi	1,022	2.43	
Others	N/A	3,048		
Turnout		42,695	64.97	
2nd round result
UMP	Jacques Masdeu-Arus	23,014	60.74	
LV	Alain Dorange	14,876	39.26	
Turnout		39,025	59.39	
UMP hold				

=== 1997 ===
Legislative Election 1997: Yvelines's 12th constituency
Party	Candidate	Votes	%	±%
RPR	Jacques Masdeu-Arus	13,913	33.92	
PS	Marie-France Ladet	8,704	21.22	
FN	Jean-Claude Varanne	6,466	15.77	
PCF	Jeanine Thomas-Flores	3,791	9.24	
LV	Alain Dorange	2,303	5.62	
DVD	Christophe Bellenge	1,200	2.93	
GE	Eléonore Gabarain	1,079	2.63	
LO	Elie Abadie	1,034	2.52	
DVE	Jean-Jacques Mercier	892	2.17	
Others	N/A	1,632		
Turnout		42,633	66.04	
2nd round result
RPR	Jacques Masdeu-Arus	23,205	54.14	
PS	Marie-France Ladet	19,658	45.86	
Turnout		45,322	70.21	
RPR hold				

== Sources ==
Official results of French elections from 2002: "Résultats électoraux officiels en France" (in French).
