= Pierre Bédier =

French politician (born 1957)

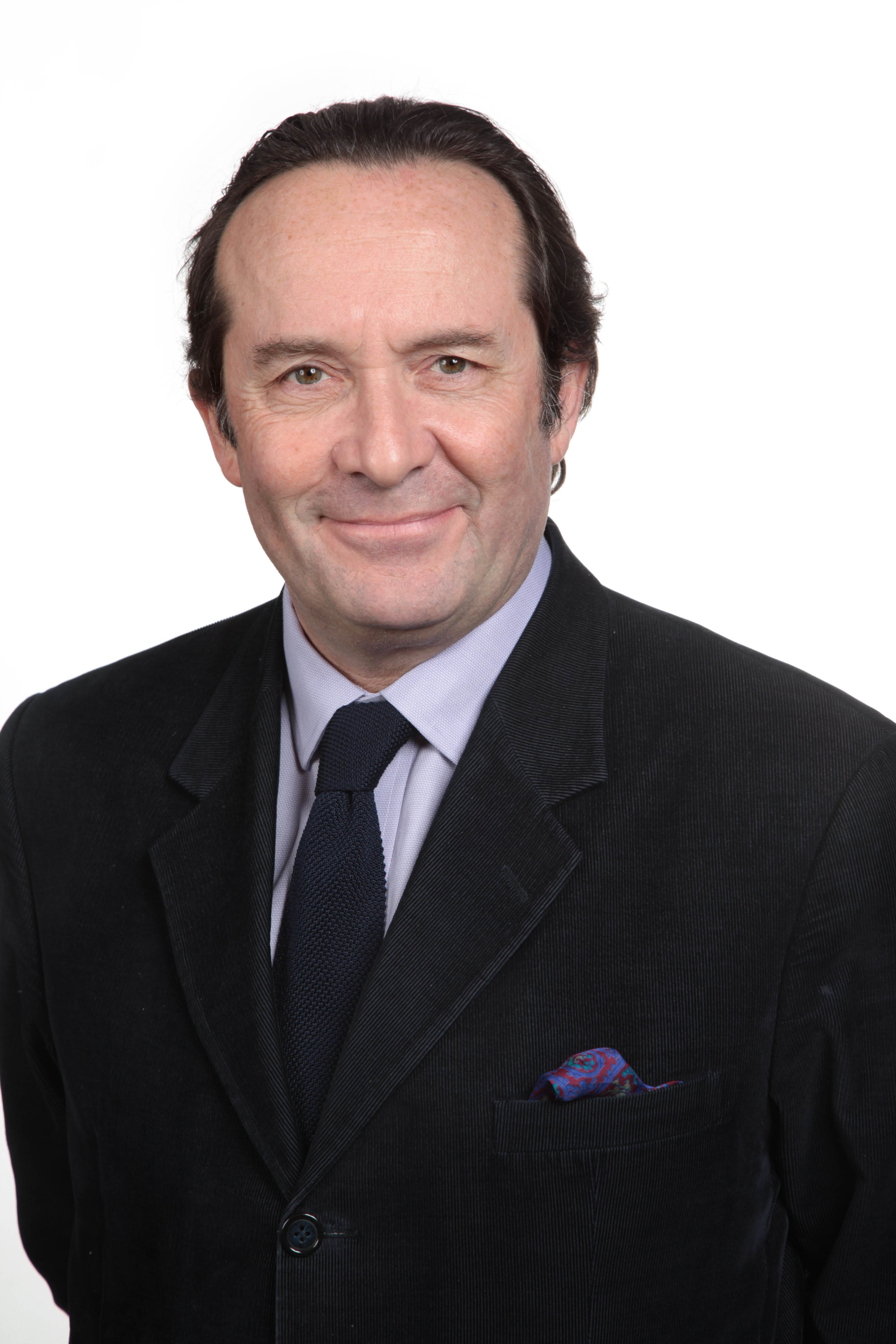

President of the Departmental Council of Yvelines
- Incumbent
- Assumed office 11 April 2014
- Preceded by: Alain Schmitz
- In office 15 September 2005 – 25 May 2009
- Preceded by: Franck Borotra
- Succeeded by: Alain Schmitz

Mayor of Mantes-la-Jolie
- In office 12 February 2004 – 3 January 2005
- Preceded by: Michel Sevin
- Succeeded by: Michel Vialay
- In office 19 June 1995 – 7 July 2002
- Preceded by: Paul Picard
- Succeeded by: Michel Sevin

Member of the French National Assembly for Yvelines' 8th constituency
- In office 7 December 2004 – 15 April 2009
- Preceded by: André Samitier
- Succeeded by: Cécile Dumoulin
- In office 2 April 1993 – 21 April 1997
- Preceded by: Bernard Schreiner
- Succeeded by: Annette Peulvast-Bergeal

Personal details
- Born: 30 September 1957 (age 68) Mont-de-Marsan, Landes
- Party: The Republicans
- Education: Sciences Po; ESSEC Business School

Pierre Bédier (French pronunciation: [pjɛʁ bedje]; born 30 September 1957 in Mont-de-Marsan, Landes) is a former member of the National Assembly of France. He represented the Yvelines department. Since 2014, he is President of the Departmental Council of Yvelines.

In 2009 Bedier was convicted of corruption.
