= Cantons of the Yvelines department =

The following is a list of the 21 cantons of the Yvelines department, in France, following the French canton reorganisation which came into effect in March 2015:

- Aubergenville
- Bonnières-sur-Seine
- Chatou
- Le Chesnay-Rocquencourt
- Conflans-Sainte-Honorine
- Houilles
- Limay
- Mantes-la-Jolie
- Maurepas
- Montigny-le-Bretonneux
- Les Mureaux
- Plaisir
- Poissy
- Rambouillet
- Saint-Cyr-l'École
- Saint-Germain-en-Laye
- Sartrouville
- Trappes
- Verneuil-sur-Seine
- Versailles-1
- Versailles-2
