= Departmental Council of Yvelines =

Departmental legislature in France

Departmental Council of Yvelines Conseil départemental des Yvelines
- Flag of Yvelines

Leadership
- President: Pierre Bedier, LR

Meeting place
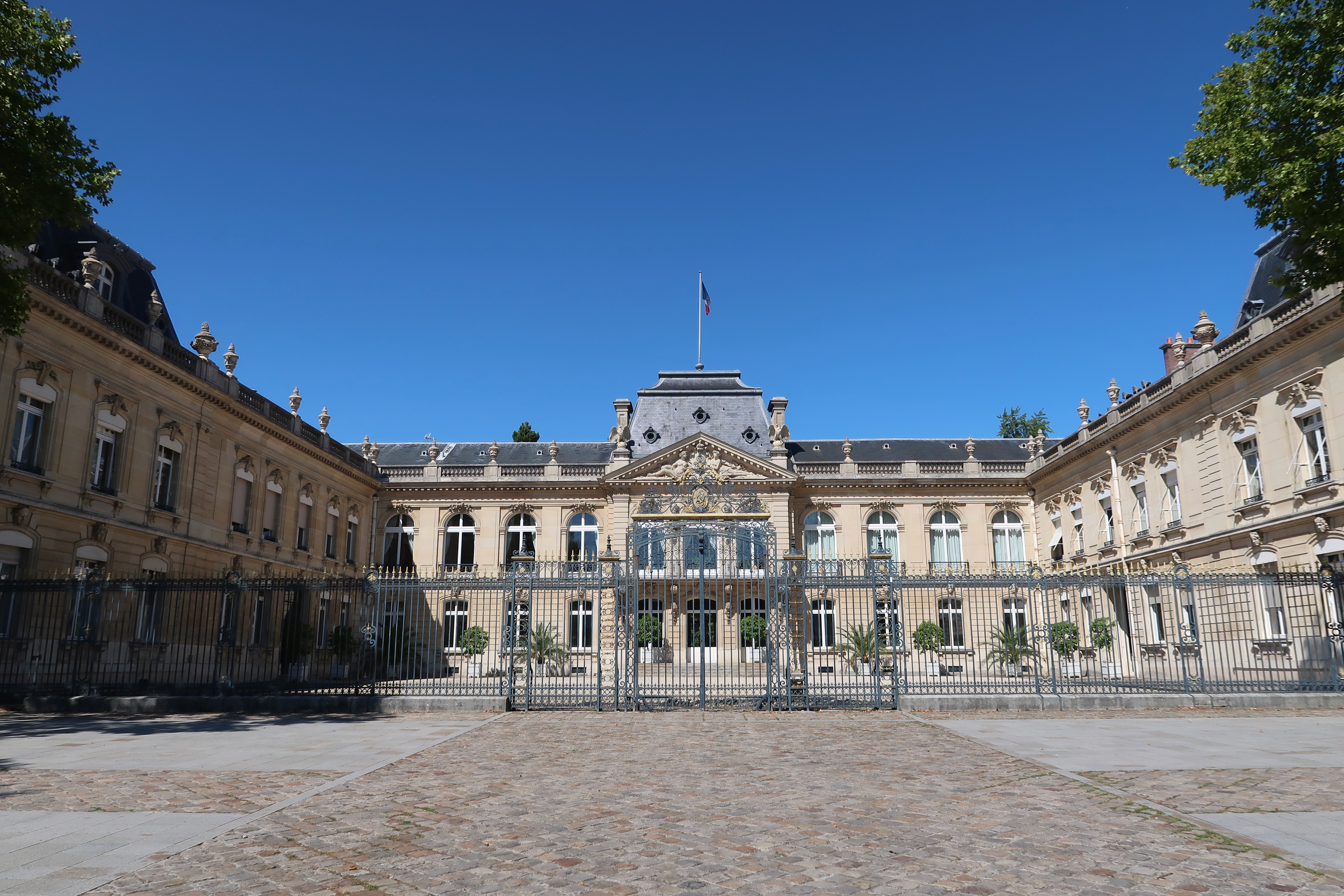
- Hôtel de la Préfecture, Versailles

Website
- yvelines.fr

The Departmental Council of Yvelines (French: Conseil départemental des Yvelines) is the deliberative assembly of the Yvelines department. Its headquarters are in Versailles in the Hôtel de la Préfecture.

== Executive ==
=== President ===
Pierre Bédier (LR) is the president of the departmental council since July 2021.

=== Vice-Presidents ===
The president of the departmental council is assisted by 12 vice-presidents chosen from among the departmental advisers. Each of them has a delegation of authority.

List of vice-presidents of the departmental council of Yvelines
Order	Name	Canton (constituency)	Delegation
1st	Pierre Fond	Sartrouville	Intercommunality, Europe and the metropolis of Paris
2nd	Marie-Hélène Aubert	Versailles-2	Autonomy and decentralized cooperation
3rd	Karl Olive	Poissy	Communication and spokesperson
4th	Catherine Arenou	Conflans-Sainte-Honorine	Integration and urban renewal
5th	Richard Delepierre	Le Chesnay-Rocquencourt	Mobility and transport
6th	Cécile Dumoulin	Limay	Colleges and digital schooling
7th	Nicolas Dainville	Trappes	Higher education, research, industry and technology
8th	Joséphine Kollmannsberger	Plaisir	Culture and tourism
9th	Laurent Richard	Aubergenville	Health
10th	Pauline Winocour-Lefèvre	Aubergenville	Rurality, agriculture, food and circuit courts
11th	Geoffroy Bax de Keating	Rambouillet	Child protection
12th	Nicole Bristol	Houilles	Biodiversity, climate and sustainable development

== Composition ==
The departmental council of Yvelines includes 42 departmental councilors from the 21 cantons of Yvelines.

Composition by party (as of 2021)
Party	Acronym	Seats	Groups
Majority (42 seats)
The Republicans	LR	33	Together for the Yvelines; (French: Ensemble pour les Yvelines)
Union of Democrats and Independents	UDI	4	Together for the Yvelines; (French: Ensemble pour les Yvelines)
Miscellaneous right	DVD	2	Together for the Yvelines; (French: Ensemble pour les Yvelines)
National Centre of Independents and Peasants	CNIP	1	Together for the Yvelines; (French: Ensemble pour les Yvelines)
VIA, the Way of the People	VIA	1	Together for the Yvelines; (French: Ensemble pour les Yvelines)
VIA, the Way of the People	VIA	1	Not registered
