= Annette Peulvast-Bergeal =

French politician

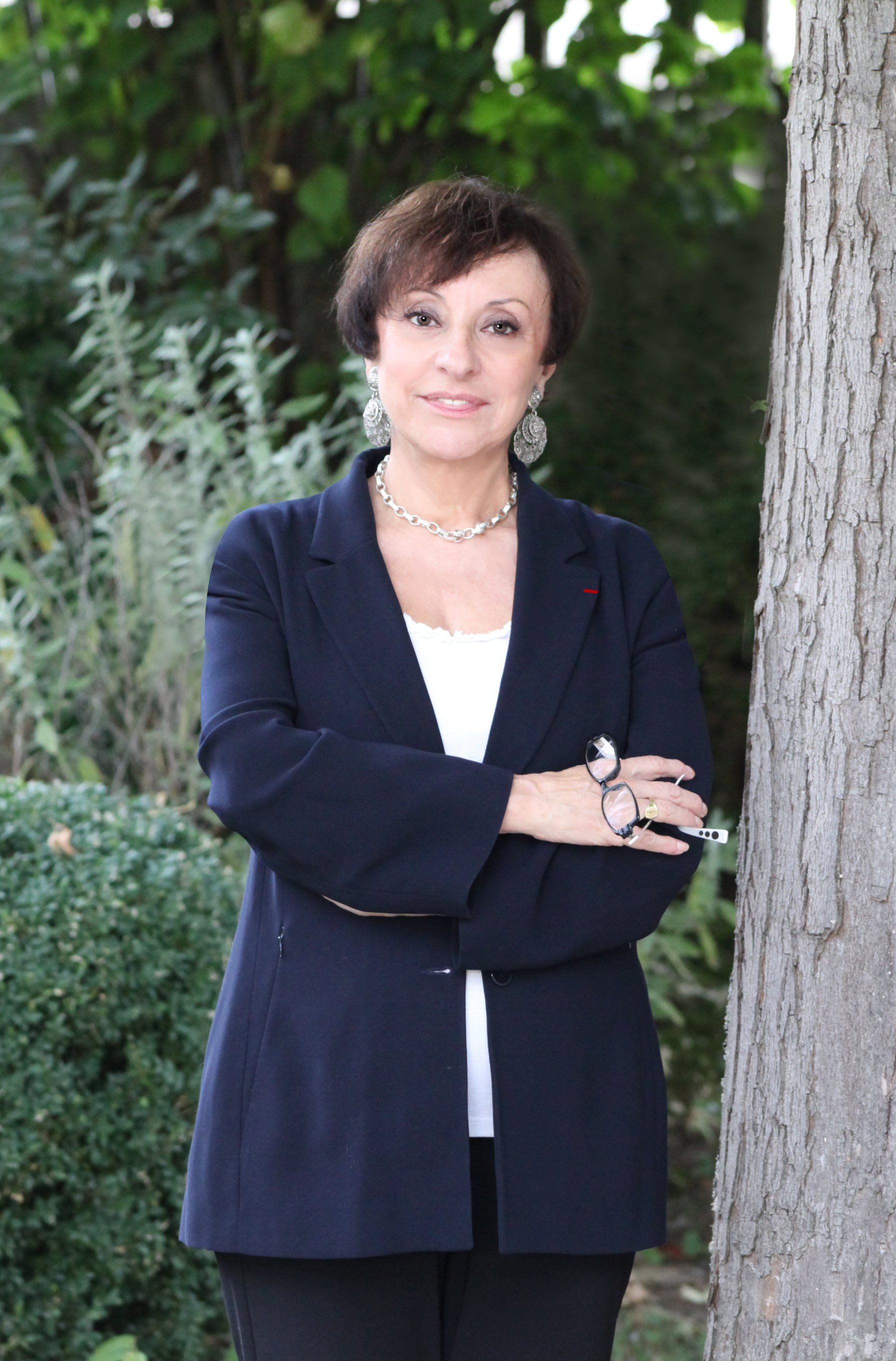

Member of the French National Assembly for Yvelines' 8th constituency
- In office 1 June 1997 – 18 June 2002
- Preceded by: Pierre Bedier
- Succeeded by: Pierre Bedier

Mayor of Mantes-la-Ville
- In office June 1995 – 21 March 2008
- Preceded by: Jacques Boyer
- Succeeded by: Monique Brochot

Personal details
- Born: 21 August 1946 (age 80) Mantes-la-Ville, Yvelines
- Party: Socialist Party (1963-2013); Miscellaneous left (2013-present)

Annette Peulvast-Bergeal (born August 21, 1946 in Mantes-la-Ville, Yvelines) is a former member of the National Assembly of France, a former member of the Socialist Party, and is now affiliated with the Miscellaneous left. In April 2000, Jean-Marie Le Pen of the Front National was found guilty of physical assault against Peulvast-Bergeal, which led to his temporary suspension from the European Parliament.
