= Michel Vialay =

French politician

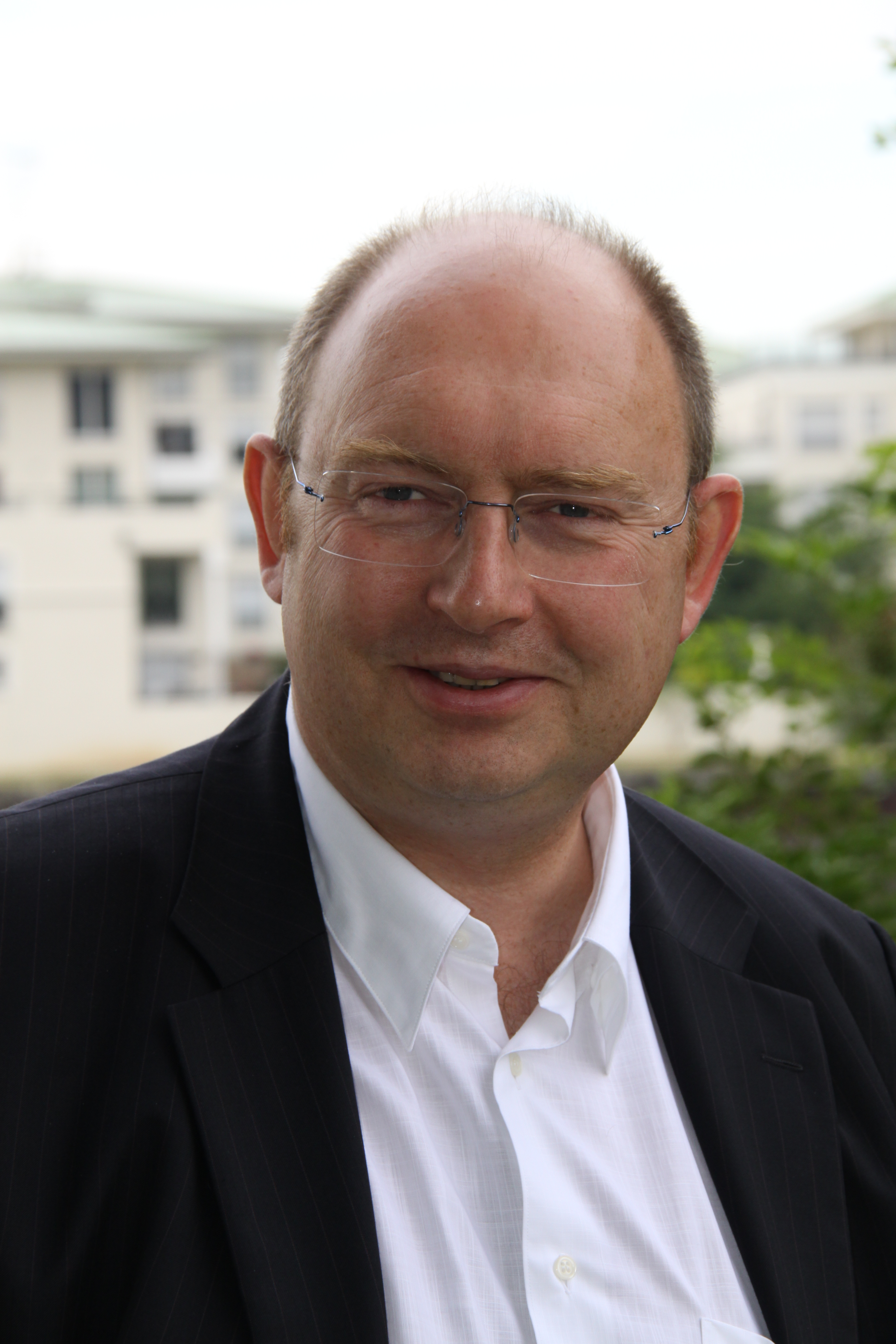

Member of the National Assembly for Yvelines's 8th constituency
- In office 21 June 2017 – 21 June 2022
- Preceded by: Françoise Descamps-Crosnier
- Succeeded by: Benjamin Lucas

Mayor of Mantes-la-Jolie
- In office 2005–2017
- Preceded by: Pierre Bédier
- Succeeded by: Raphaël Cognet

Personal details
- Born: 6 January 1960 (age 66) Paris, France
- Party: The Republicans
- Other political affiliations: RPR (until 2002); UMP (until 2015)

Michel Vialay (French pronunciation: [miʃɛl vjalɛ]; born 6 January 1960) is a French Republican politician who has represented Yvelines's 8th constituency in the National Assembly between 2017 and 2022.
