= Hôtel de préfecture des Yvelines =

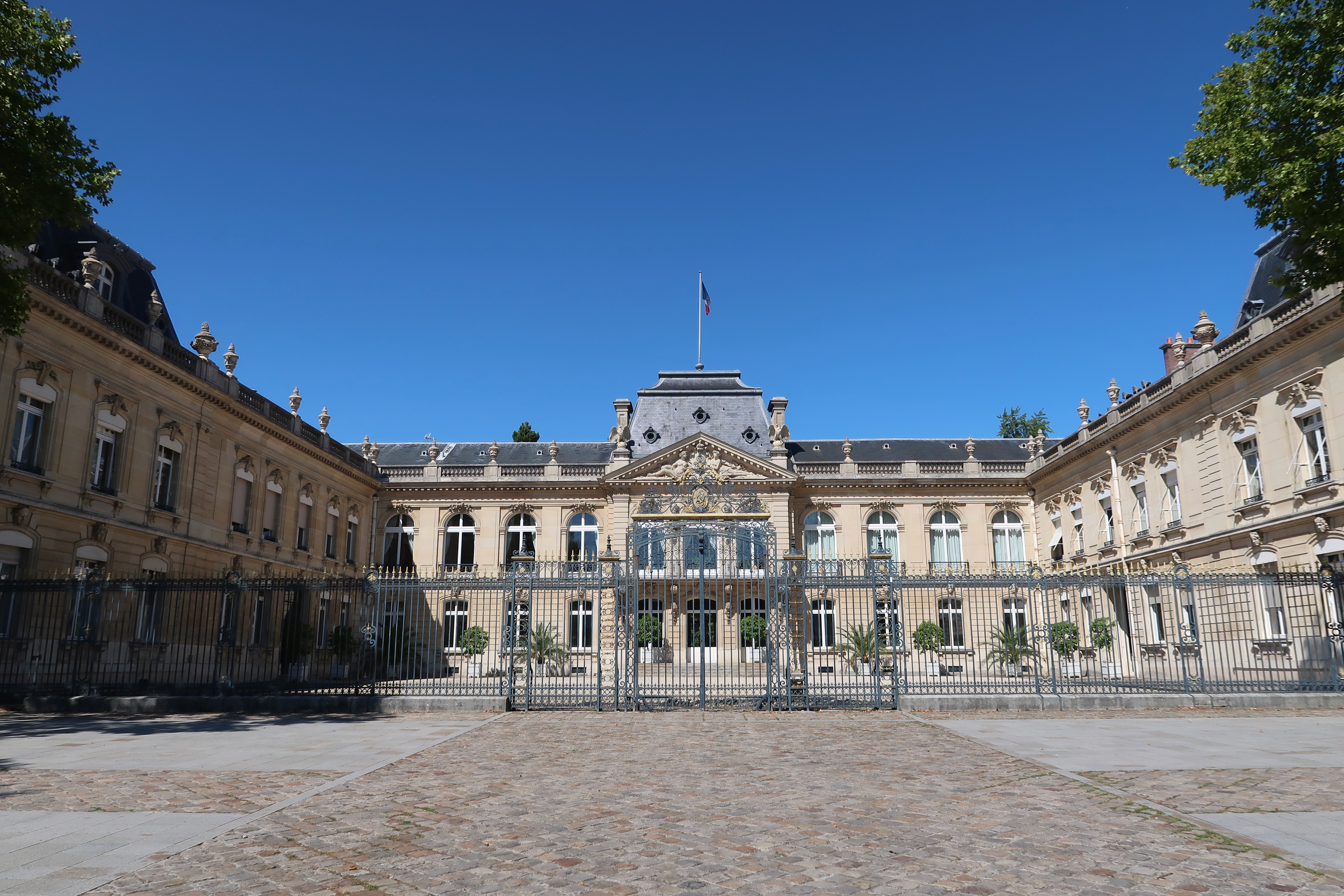
- Hôtel de prefecture of Yvelines, avenue de Paris in Versailles
- Interactive map of the Hôtel de préfecture des Yvelines area

General information
- Location: Versailles, France
- Coordinates: 48°48′09″N 2°07′57″E
- Construction started: 1863
- Completed: 1866

Design and construction
- Architect: Amédée Manuel

The Hôtel de Préfecture des Yvelines is a freestone building, located in Versailles, France. It is, since 1968, the year of creation of the department, the seat of the prefecture and the departmental council of Yvelines.

== Location ==
The prefecture hotel is located in Versailles, at 11–13, avenue de Paris (avenue which is in the axis of the Palace of Versailles ) at the corner of rue Jean Houdon.

== History ==
The hotel of the prefecture of Versailles was built from 1863 to 1866 on the site of the former royal kennel (French: Chenil du Roi), by the Versailles architect Amédée Manuel on an order from the prefect Édouard Charton. It was inaugurated on June 19, 1867.

In 1870, it became the seat of the Prussian General Staff, then during the period of the Paris Commune, it housed the government of Adolphe Thiers and then of Patrice de MacMahon. From 1880, it was the seat of the prefecture of Seine-et-Oise, and from 1968, that of the prefecture of Yvelines.

== Architecture ==
The triangular pediment which crowns the central avant-corps of the building is decorated with a bas-relief due to the sculptor Georges Clère, which represents the Oise and the Seine personified.
