= Henri Cuq =

French politician

Minister for the Relations with the Parliament
- In office 2004–2007
- President: Jacques Chirac
- Prime Minister: Jean-Pierre Raffarin; Dominique de Villepin
- Preceded by: Jean-François Copé
- Succeeded by: Roger Karoutchi

Member of the National Assembly for Yvelines's 9th constituency
- In office 2007–2010
- Preceded by: Pierre Amouroux
- Succeeded by: Sophie Primas

Personal details
- Born: 12 March 1942 Toulouse, France
- Died: 11 June 2010 (aged 68) Paris, France
- Party: UMP
- Education: Institut d'études politiques de Toulouse

Henri Cuq (12 March 1942 – 11 June 2010) was a member of the National Assembly of France. He represented the Yvelines department, and was a member of the Union for a Popular Movement.
