= Brigitte Henriques =

French footballer (born 1971)

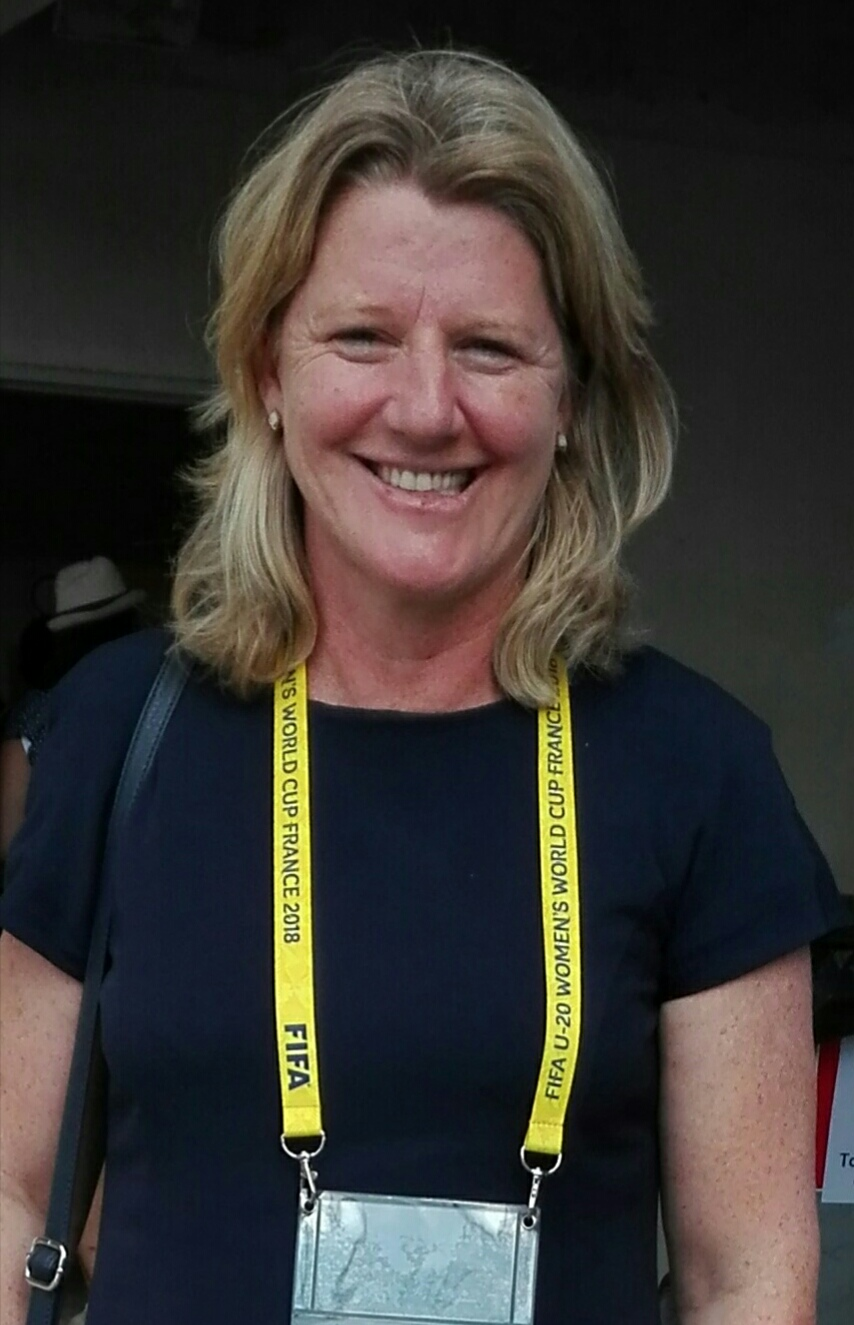
- Henriques in 2018

Personal information
- Full name: Brigitte Maria De Jésus Catherine Henriques
- Birth name: Brigitte Maria De Jésus Catherine Olive
- Date of birth: 4 March 1971 (age 55)
- Place of birth: Saint-Germain-en-Laye, France
- Position: Midfielder

Senior career*
Years	Team	Apps	(Gls)
1983-1992	Féminine Poissy JS		
1992-1997	FCF Juvisy		
1997-1999	ASJ Soyaux		

International career
1988-1997	France	32	(2)
- * Club domestic league appearances and goals

Brigitte Maria De Jésus Catherine Henriques (née Olive) is a French former footballer who played as a forward for FCF Juvisy of the Division 1 Féminine. She is now president of the French National Olympic and Sports Committee. Henriques succeeded Denis Masseglia. In 2022, Henriques resigned. Her brother is Karl Olive.

== International career ==
Henriques represented France 32 times from 1988-1997.

== Honours ==
- Knight of the National Order of Merit: 2015
