= Arrondissements of the Yvelines department =

Administrative divisions of Yvelines, France

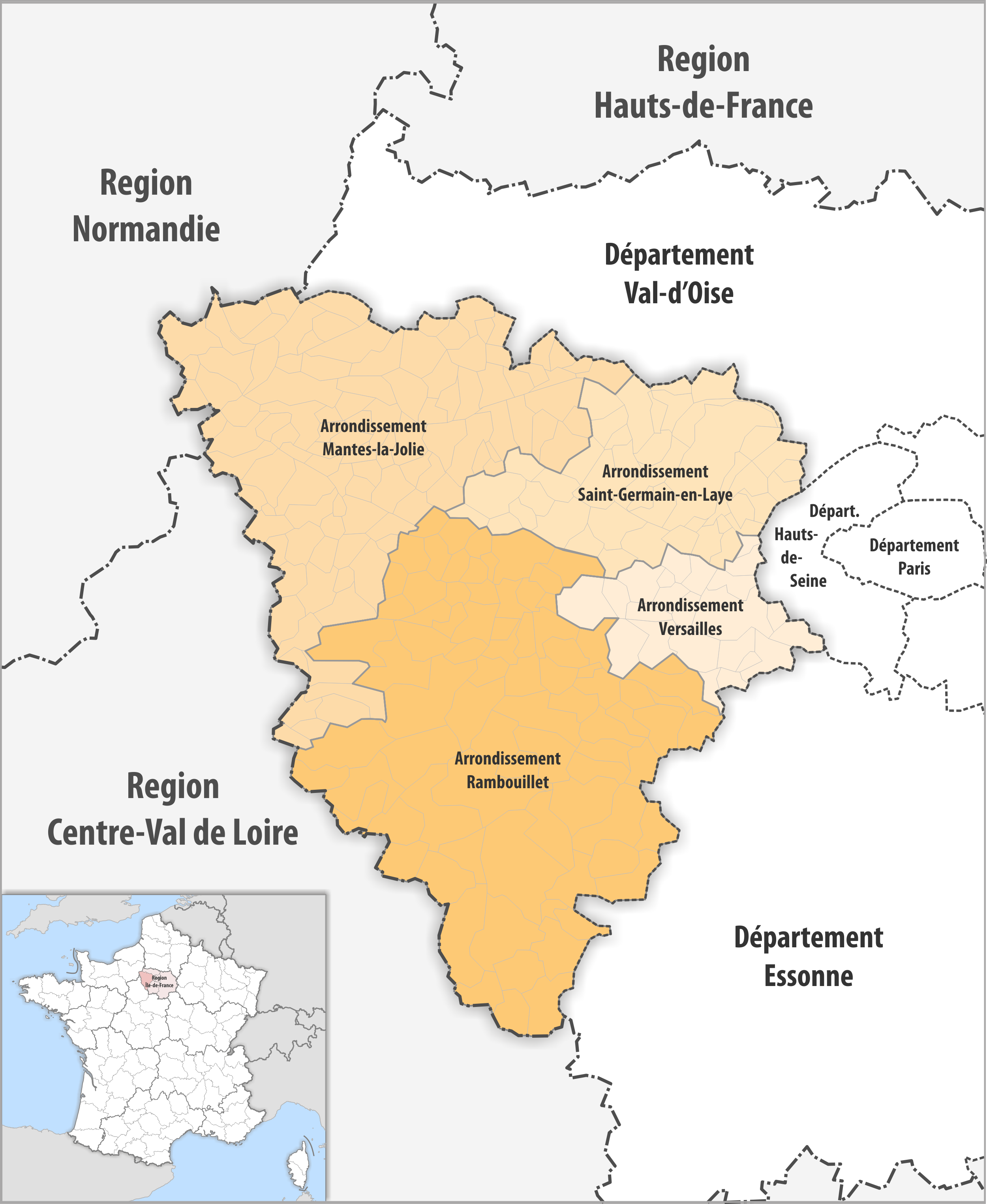
Map of arrondissements of the Yvelines department.

The 4 arrondissements of the Yvelines department are:

1. Arrondissement of Mantes-la-Jolie, (subprefecture: Mantes-la-Jolie) with 109 communes. The population of the arrondissement was 280,641 in 2021.
2. Arrondissement of Rambouillet, (subprefecture: Rambouillet) with 83 communes. The population of the arrondissement was 230,545 in 2021.
3. Arrondissement of Saint-Germain-en-Laye, (subprefecture: Saint-Germain-en-Laye) with 44 communes. The population of the arrondissement was 527,408 in 2021.
4. Arrondissement of Versailles, (prefecture of the Yvelines department: Versailles) with 23 communes. The population of the arrondissement was 417,771 in 2021.

== History ==
In 1800 the arrondissements of Versailles and Mantes were established as part of the department Seine-et-Oise. The arrondissement of Rambouillet was created in 1812. The arrondissement of Mantes was disbanded in 1926, and restored in 1943. The arrondissement of Saint-Germain-en-Laye was created in 1962. In 1968 the department Seine-et-Oise was disbanded, and the arrondissements of Versailles, Mantes-la-Jolie, Rambouillet and Saint-Germain-en-Laye became part of the new department Yvelines.

The borders of the arrondissements of Yvelines were modified in January 2017:

- one commune from the arrondissement of Mantes-la-Jolie to the arrondissement of Rambouillet
- six communes from the arrondissement of Mantes-la-Jolie to the arrondissement of Saint-Germain-en-Laye
- six communes from the arrondissement of Saint-Germain-en-Laye to the arrondissement of Versailles
- one commune from the arrondissement of Versailles to the arrondissement of Rambouillet
