= Yvelines's 9th constituency =

Constituency of the National Assembly of France

9th constituency of Yvelines
- inline Constituency of the National Assembly of France

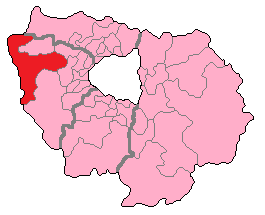
- Yvelines' 9th Constituency shown within Île-de-France
- Deputy: Dieynaba Diop; PS
- Department: Yvelines
- Cantons: Aubergenville · Bonnières-sur-Seine · Guerville · Houdan ·
- Registered voters: 89,312

The 9th constituency of Yvelines is a French legislative constituency in the Yvelines département.

== Description ==
The 9th constituency of Yvelines is one of the larger constituencies in the department and covers its western territory including the border with Eure-et-Loir.

The seat was created in 1988 and since then has continuously elected conservative deputies. The seat was left vacant in 2011 following the elevation of Sophie Primas to the France.

== Historic Representation ==
Election	Member	Party
1986	Proportional representation – no election by constituency	
1988	Henri Cuq	RPR
1993	Henri Cuq	RPR
1997	Henri Cuq	RPR
2002	Henri Cuq	UMP
2007	Henri Cuq	UMP
2010	Sophie Primas	UMP
2012	Jean-Marie Tétart	UMP
2017	Bruno Millienne	MoDem
2022	Bruno Millienne	MoDem
2024	Dieynaba Diop	PS

== Election results ==
=== 2024 ===
Candidate	Party	Alliance	First round			Second round		
Candidate	Party	Alliance	Votes	%	+/–	Votes	%	+/–
Laurent Morin	RN		21,551	34.49	+12.04	26,477	46.03	+23.58
Dieynaba Diop	PS	NFP	18,520	29.64	+7.39	31,042	53.97	n/a
Bruno Millienne	MoDem	ENS	13,340	21.35	-4.99	WITHDREW		
Hervé Riou	LR		5,563	8.90	-1.32			
Rachid Zerouali	DIV		1,780	2.85	+2.04			
Christophe Le Hot	REC		802	1.28	-4.16			
Philippe Gommard	LO		601	0.96	+0.01			
Sendil-Sébastien Djearamane	DIV		336	0.54	N/A			
Valid votes			62,493	97.78	+0.08	57,519	90.71	-7.07
Blank votes			1,037	1.62	-0.04	4,863	7.67	+6.05
Null votes			381	0.60	+0.12	1,025	1.62	+1.02
Turnout			63,911	67.90	+20.84	63,407	67.35	-0.55
Abstentions			30,212	32.10	-20.84	30,740	32.65	+0.55
Registered voters			94,123			94,147		
Source: Ministry of the Interior, Le Monde
Result						PS GAIN FROM MoDem		

=== 2022 ===
Legislative Election 2022: Yvelines's 9th constituency
Party	Candidate	Votes	%	±%
MoDem (Ensemble)	Bruno Millienne	11,275	26.34	-11.42
RN	Laurent Morin	9,613	22.45	+7.15
LFI (NUPÉS)	Victor Pailhac	9,525	22.25	+4.39
LR (UDC)	Pauline Winocour Lefevre	4,376	10.22	−10.09
REC	Christophe Le Hot	2,331	5.44	N/A
DVE	Magà Ettori	1,400	3.27	N/A
DVD	Babette De Rozieres	1,246	2.91	N/A
DIV	Fatma Lamir	1,206	2.82	N/A
Others	N/A	1,841	4.30	
Turnout		42,813	47.06	+0.34
2nd round result
MoDem (Ensemble)	Bruno Millienne	21,452	57.85	+3.36
RN	Laurent Morin	15,631	42.15	N/A
Turnout		37,083	44.11	+7.95
MoDem hold				

=== 2017 ===
Legislative Election 2017: Yvelines's 9th constituency
Party	Candidate	Votes	%	±%
MoDem	Bruno Millienne	16,048	37.76	
LR	Jean-Marie Tetart	8,634	20.31	
FN	Emmanuel Norbert-Couade	6,501	15.30	
LFI	Guillaume Quintin	4,794	11.28	
PS	Ali Mohammad	1,616	3.80	
EELV	Salah Anouar	1,181	2.78	
DLF	Marie-France Lavenne-Reynaert	948	2.23	
Others	N/A	2,781		
Turnout		42,503	46.72	
2nd round result
MoDem	Bruno Millienne	17,926	54.49	
LR	Jean-Marie Tetart	14,971	45.51	
Turnout		32,897	36.16	
MoDem gain from LR				

=== 2012 ===
Legislative Election 2012: Yvelines's 9th constituency
Party	Candidate	Votes	%	±%
UMP	Jean-Marie Tetart	17,502	36.06	
EELV	Mounir Satouri	16,146	33.26	
FN	Pierre Chassin	9,134	18.82	
FG	Navid Hussain-Zaidi	2,332	4.80	
Others	N/A	3,428		
Turnout		49,483	55.40	
2nd round result
UMP	Jean-Marie Tetart	26,582	56.83	
EELV	Mounir Satouri	20,192	43.17	
Turnout		48,366	54.15	
UMP hold				

=== 2007 ===
Legislative Election 2007: Yvelines's 9th constituency
Party	Candidate	Votes	%	±%
UMP	Henri Cuq	26,664	52.86	
PS	Dominique Francesconi	9,264	18.37	
MoDem	Monique Le Saux	3,828	7.59	
FN	Jean-Louis D'Andre	3,084	6.11	
LV	Mohammed Sik	1,875	3.72	
PCF	Joseph Trehel	1,380	2.74	
Far left	Martine Petitpain	1,346	2.67	
Others	N/A	3,001		
Turnout		51,272	59.23	
UMP hold				

=== 2002 ===
Legislative Election 2002: Yvelines's 9th constituency
Party	Candidate	Votes	%	±%
UMP	Henri Cuq	24,021	47.74	
LV	Albert Bischerour	11,979	23.81	
FN	Jean-Louis D'Andre	7,904	15.71	
PCF	Armelle Herve	1,570	3.12	
Others	N/A	4,847		
Turnout		51,218	65.27	
2nd round result
UMP	Henri Cuq	28,299	63.52	
LV	Albert Bischerour	16,251	36.48	
Turnout		46,194	58.88	
UMP hold				

=== 1997 ===
Legislative Election 1997: Yvelines's 9th constituency
Party	Candidate	Votes	%	±%
RPR	Henri Cuq	16,609	32.97	
FN	Michel Bayvet	11,893	23.61	
PS	Jean-Alain Rousseau	9,870	19.59	
PCF	Joseph Tréhel	3,621	7.19	
GE	Jean-Pierre Delhaye	2,028	4.03	
DVE	Albert Bischerour	1,526	3.03	
LO	Alain Luguet	1,479	2.94	
DVD	Anne La Marcis	1,283	2.55	
Others	N/A	2,074		
Turnout		52,350	70.18	
2nd round result
RPR	Henri Cuq	25,320	46.39	
PS	Jean-Alain Rousseau	19,273	35.31	
FN	Michel Bayvet	9,982	18.29	
Turnout		56,209	75.35	
RPR hold				

== Sources ==
Official results of French elections from 2002: "Résultats électoraux officiels en France" (in French).
