= Sophie Primas =

French politician (born 1962)

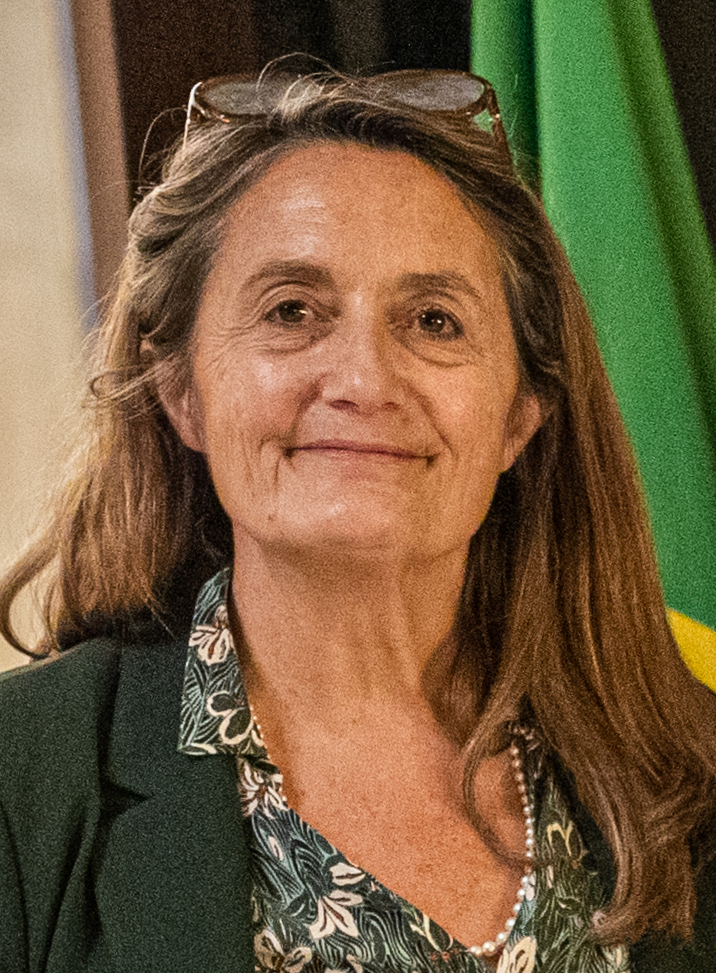

Spokesperson of the Government
- In office 23 December 2024 – 9 September 2025
- Prime Minister: François Bayrou
- Preceded by: Maud Bregeon
- Succeeded by: Aurore Bergé

Minister Delegate for Foreign Trade and the French Abroad
- In office 21 September 2024 – 5 December 2024
- Prime Minister: Michel Barnier
- Preceded by: Franck Riester
- Succeeded by: Laurent Saint-Martin

Senator for Yvelines
- Incumbent
- Assumed office 10 October 2025
- In office 1 October 2011 – 21 October 2024

Member of the National Assembly for Yvelines's 9th constituency
- In office 11 June 2010 – 30 September 2011
- Preceded by: Henri Cuq
- Succeeded by: Jean-Marie Tétart

Mayor of Aubergenville
- In office 4 April 2014 – 27 October 2017
- Preceded by: François Bony
- Succeeded by: Thierry Montangerand

Personal details
- Born: 7 June 1962 (age 64) Saint-Mandé, France
- Party: Rally for the Republic (until 2002); Union for a Popular Movement (2001–2015); The Republicans (2015–2024, 2024–present)
- Other political affiliations: New Energy (2021–present)
- Education: ESSEC Business School; Unilasalle

Sophie Primas (French pronunciation: [sɔfi pʁima]; born 7 June 1962) is a French politician who served as Spokesperson in the government of Prime Minister François Bayrou from 2024 to 2025. A member of The Republicans (LR), which she briefly left amid the 2024 The Republicans alliance crisis, she previously served as Minister Delegate for Foreign Trade and the French Abroad in the government of Prime Minister Michel Barnier between September and December 2024.

Prior to her appointment to the Barnier government, Primas represented Yvelines in the National Assembly (2010–2011), then in the Senate (2011–2024). Following the dismissal of the Bayrou government by the National Assembly, she regained her Senate seat.

== Political career ==
Primas was elected a municipal councillor of Aubergenville at age 20 in 1983, before she became deputy mayor for finance in 2001. She was elected mayor of Aubergenville in the 2014 municipal election, after her list won over 80% of the first-round vote.

Primas replaced Henri Cuq in the National Assembly in 2010 following his death, as she ran as his substitute in the 2007 legislative election in the 9th constituency of Yvelines. She held the seat from 11 June 2010 until 30 September 2011, when she resigned upon her election to the Senate.

In the 2011 Senate election, Primas was second on the list led by Senate President Gérard Larcher in Yvelines. From 2017 to 2023, she chaired the Senate's Committee on Economic Affairs; she was the first woman to hold this position. From 2023 to 2024, she was one of the Senate's vice presidents.

In The Republicans primary ahead of the 2017 French presidential election, Primas endorsed François Fillon. She had already supported Fillon in the 2012 Union for a Popular Movement leadership election.

Ahead of the 2022 presidential election, Primas was part of The Republicans candidate Valérie Pécresse's campaign team.

In 2024, she was appointed to the Barnier government as Minister Delegate for Foreign Trade and the French Abroad. In the Bayrou government she was Government Spokesperson.

In the 2025 The Republicans leadership election, Primas endorsed Bruno Retailleau for the party leadership.
