= Jacques Masdeu-Arus =

French politician (1942–2018)

Member of the 12th Constituency of Yvelines
- In office 5 April 1988 – 6 August 2009
- Preceded by: Robert Wagner
- Succeeded by: David Douillet

Mayor of Poissy
- In office 13 March 1983 – 21 April 2008
- Preceded by: Joseph Tréhel
- Succeeded by: Frédérik Bernard
- Parliamentary group: RPR & UMP

Personal details
- Born: 7 August 1942 Paris, France
- Died: 14 November 2018 (aged 76)

Jacques Masdeu-Arus (7 August 1942 – 4 November 2018) was a member of the National Assembly of France. He represented the Yvelines department, and was a member of the Union for a Popular Movement.

== Biography ==
After an early career as an engineer, Jacques Masdeu-Arus became a councillor of Poissy in 1981 under Mayor Joseph Tréhel. Masdeu-Arus would succeed Tréhel as mayor after the municipal elections of 1983. He was also on the General Council of Yvelines from 1982 to 1988.

Following Robert Wagner's death in 1988, Masdeu-Arus became a member of the 12th constituency of Yvelines. He served until 2009, when the constituency was ended by the Constitutional Council.

In 2004, Masdeu-Arus supported a bill for the death penalty for terrorists, but voted against the death penalty in 2007. In the National Assembly, he was a member of the Study of Tibet Committee.
