= Dieynaba Diop =

French politician (born 1974)

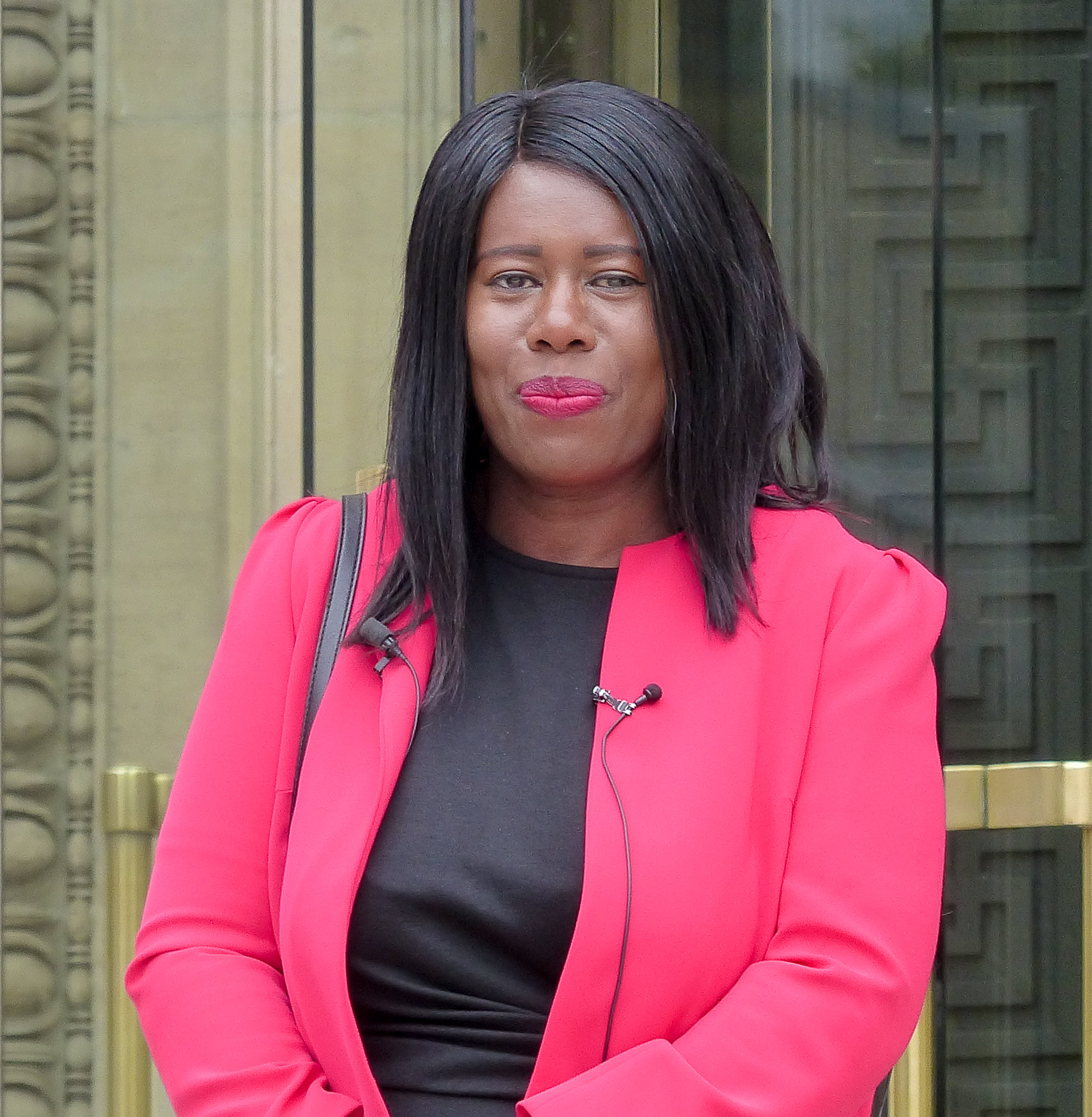

Member of the National Assembly for Yvelines's 9th constituency
- Incumbent
- Assumed office 18 July 2024
- Preceded by: Bruno Millienne

Personal details
- Born: 15 July 1974 (age 52) Mantes-la-Jolie, France
- Citizenship: France; Senegal
- Party: Socialist Party
- Education: Paris Nanterre University
- Profession: Teacher

Dieynaba Diop (born 15 July 1974) is a French politician of the Socialist Party who was elected member of the National Assembly for Yvelines's 9th constituency in 2024. She serves as deputy mayor of Les Mureaux and as a member of the Regional Council of Île-de-France. Within the Socialist Party she serves as a spokesperson and as its departmental secretary in Yvelines. She was a candidate for the European Parliament in the 2024 European Parliament election. Diop is a Franco-Senegalese dual national.
