= Françoise Descamps-Crosnier =

French politician

Member of the French National Assembly for Yvelines' 8th constituency
- In office 20 June 2012 – 20 June 2017
- Preceded by: Cécile Dumoulin
- Succeeded by: Michel Vialay

Mayor of Rosny-sur-Seine
- In office 2001 – March 2013
- Preceded by: Position established
- Succeeded by: Valérie Gargani

Personal details
- Born: 13 October 1955 (age 70) Mantes-la-Jolie, France
- Party: Socialist Party

Françoise Descamps-Crosnier (born 13 October 1955) is a French politician who was member of the National Assembly of France as member of the Socialist Party.
