= Cécile Dumoulin =

French politician (born 1966)

Member of the French National Assembly for Yvelines' 8th constituency
- In office 17 April 2009 – 17 June 2012
- Preceded by: Pierre Bédier
- Succeeded by: Françoise Descamps-Crosnier

Department Councilor for the Canton of Limay
- Incumbent
- Assumed office 2 April 2015 Serving with Guy Muller

Personal details
- Born: 10 November 1966 (age 59) Hennebont, Morbihan
- Party: Union for a Popular Movement

Cécile Dumoulin (born 10 November 1966 in Hennebont, Morbihan) is a former member of the National Assembly of France and is a member of the Union for a Popular Movement. She is currently a departmental councilor for the Canton of Limay. She is a trained veterinarian.
