= Benjamin Lucas-Lundy =

French politician

Benjamin Lucas
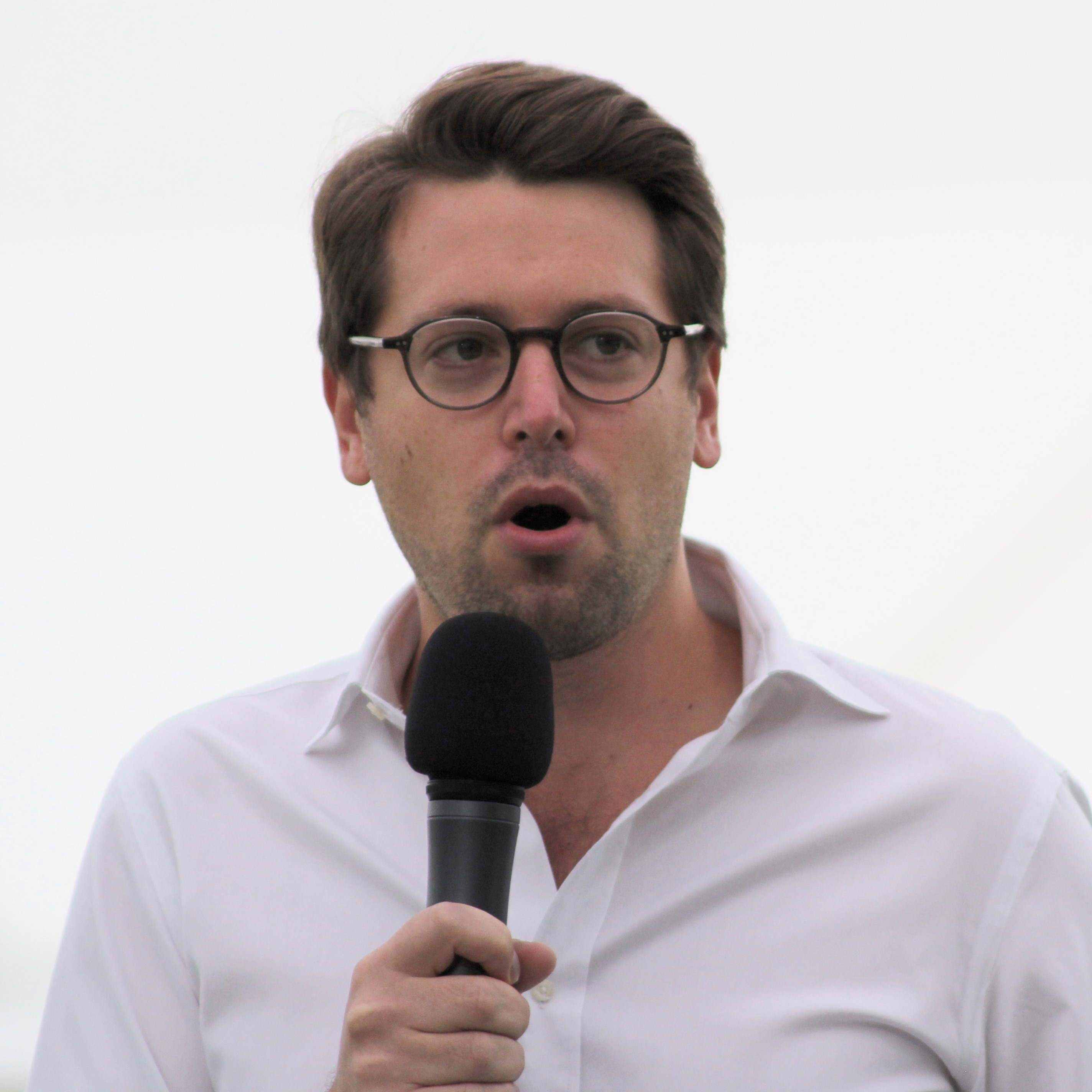
- Benjamin Lucas in 2021

Member of the National Assembly for Yvelines's 8th constituency
- Incumbent
- Assumed office 22 June 2022
- Preceded by: Michel Vialay

President of the Young Socialist Movement
- In office 2015–2018
- Preceded by: Laura Slimani
- Succeeded by: Roxane Lundy

Personal details
- Born: 8 October 1990 (age 35) Amiens, France
- Party: Socialist Party; Génération.s
- Spouse: Roxane Lundy (m. 2023)
- Education: University of Picardy Jules Verne

Benjamin Lucas-Lundy (née Lucas; born 8 October 1990) is a French politician from Génération.s. He has been Member of Parliament for Yvelines's 8th constituency since 2022.

== Career ==
Lucas was president of the Young Socialist Movement from 2015 to 2018.

== See also ==
- List of deputies of the 16th National Assembly of France
