= Canton of Poissy =

Coordinates: 48.93°N 2.04°E

Poissy
- Canton
- Interactive map of Poissy
- Country: France
- Region: Île-de-France
- Department: Yvelines
- No. of communes: {{{nbcomm}}}

Government
  - Representatives (2021–2028): Karl Olive; Suzanne Jaunet
- Area: 29.91 km^{2} (11.55 sq mi)
- Population (2023): 84,049
  - Density: 2,810/km^{2} (7,278/sq mi)
- INSEE code: 78 13

The canton of Poissy is an administrative division of the Yvelines department, northern France. It was created at the French canton reorganisation which came into effect in March 2015. Its seat is in Poissy.

== Composition ==
It consists of the following communes:

1. Achères
2. Carrières-sous-Poissy
3. Poissy

== Councillors ==
Election	Councillors	Party	Occupation
2015	Karl Olive	LR	Mayor of Poissy
2015	Élodie Sornay	LR	Councillor of Achères

== Pictures of the canton ==
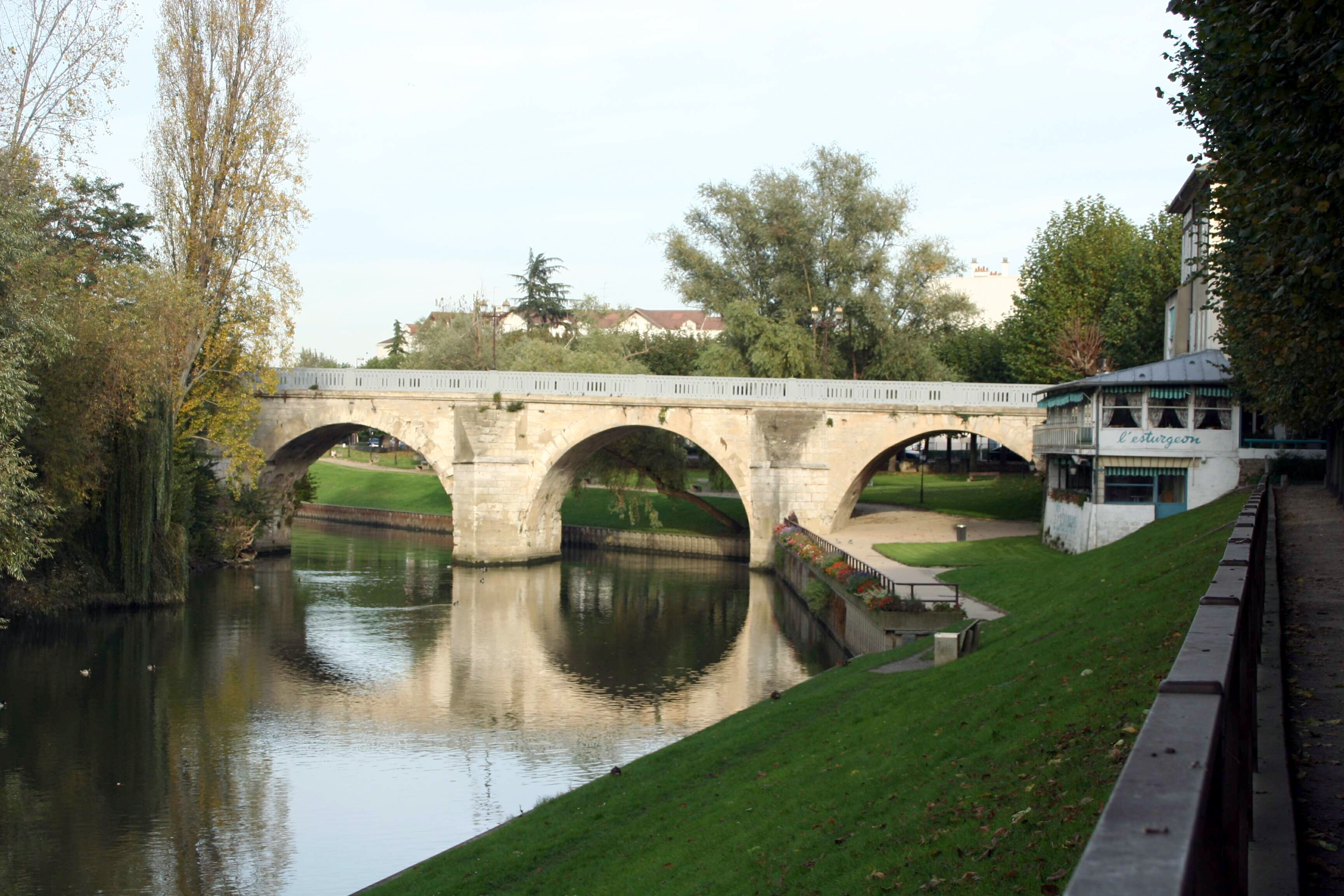
Old Poissy's bridge

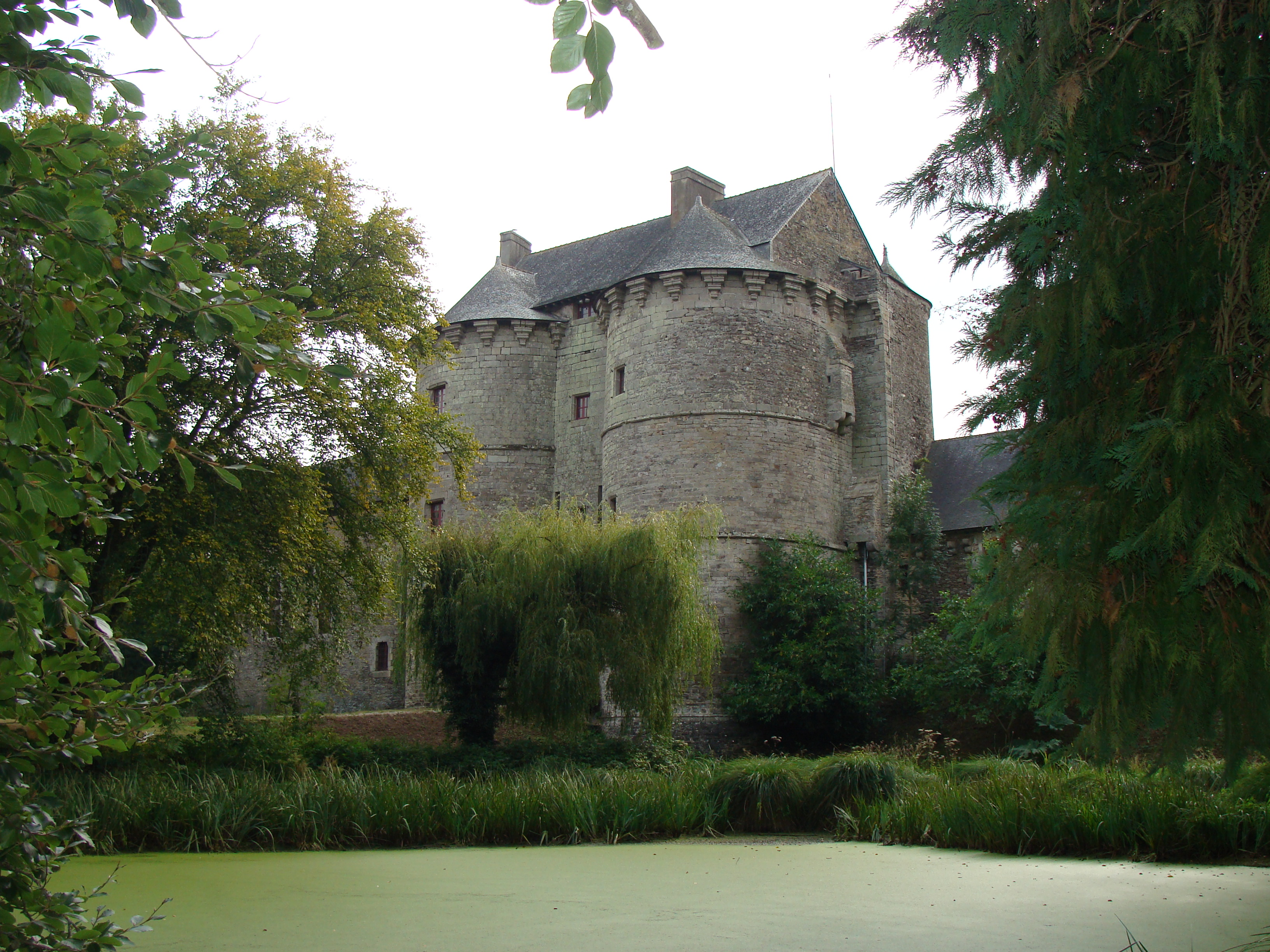
View of Achères

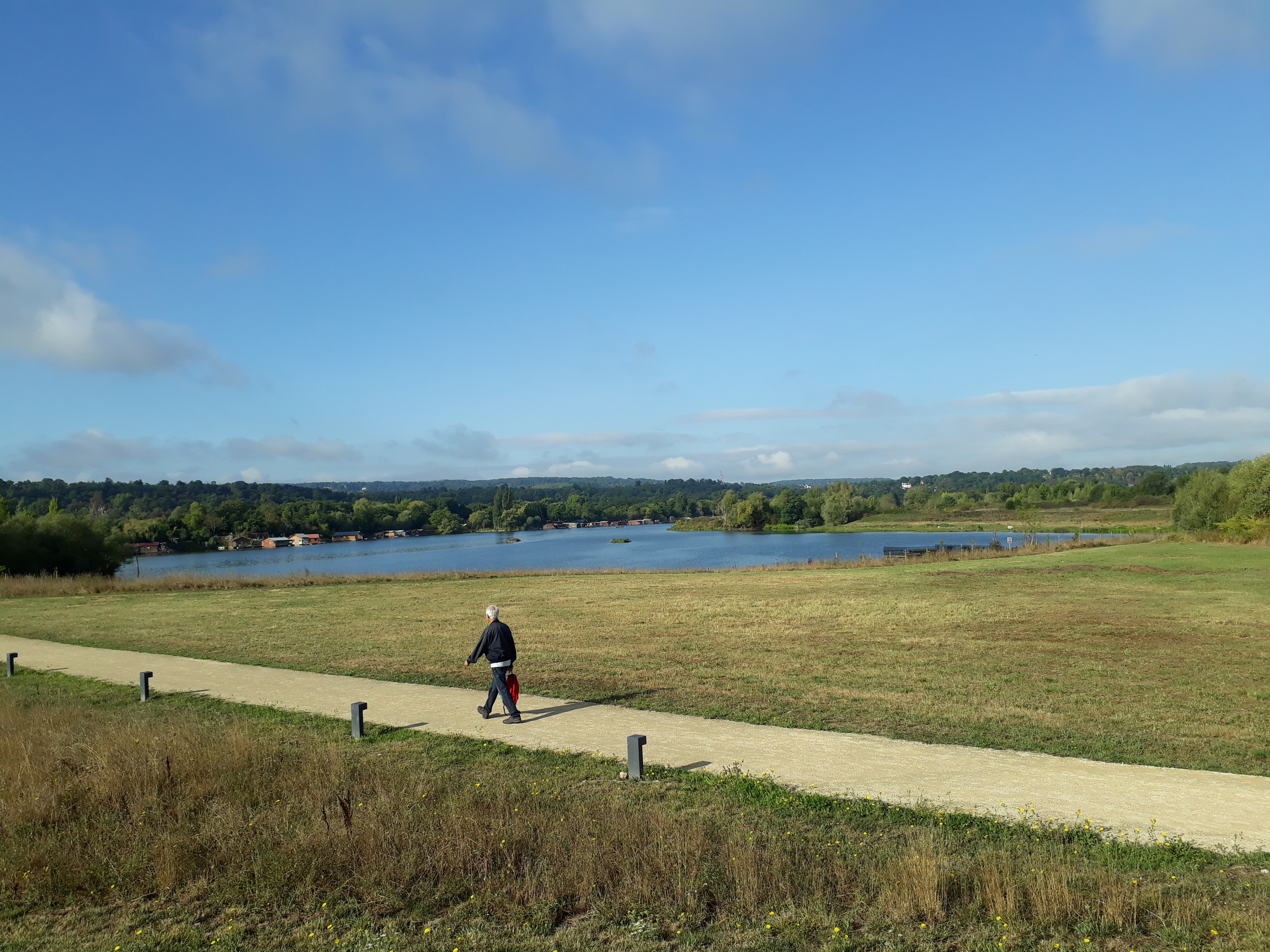
Carrières-sous-Poissy's park
