= Bernard Schreiner =

French politician (1937–2020)

Bernard Schreiner (16 August 1937 – 24 March 2020), was a French politician.

Schreiner was born in Brumath, Bas-Rhin. He fought in the Algerian War and was decorated with the Croix de la Valeur Militaire.

He was elected as a representative on 16 June 2002 for the XIIth legislature (2002–2007), representing the Bas-Rhin district. He was a member of the Union for a Popular Movement (UMP) party.

Schreiner died on 24 March 2020.

== Offices ==
- 03/25/1977 – 03/13/1983: Mayor of Brumath (Bas-Rhin)
- 03/14/1983 – 03/19/1989: Mayor of Brumath (Bas-Rhin)
- 03/16/1986 – 01/31/1989: Member of the Regional Counsel of Alsace
- 06/18/1988 – 04/01/1993: Legislator
- 01/03/1988 – 03/27/1994: Member of the General Counsel of Bas-Rhin
- 03/20/1989 – 06/18/1995: Mayor of Brumath (Bas-Rhin)
- 04/02/1993 – 04/21/1997: Legislator
- 03/28/1994 – 03/18/2001: Member of the General Counsel of Bas-Rhin
- 06/19/1995 – 03/18/2001: Mayor of Brumath (Bas-Rhin)
- 06/01/1997 – 06/18/2002: Legislator

As of 16 June 2002:

- Member of the General Counsel of Bas-Rhin
