= Yvelines =

Department of France in Île-de-France

- Department of France
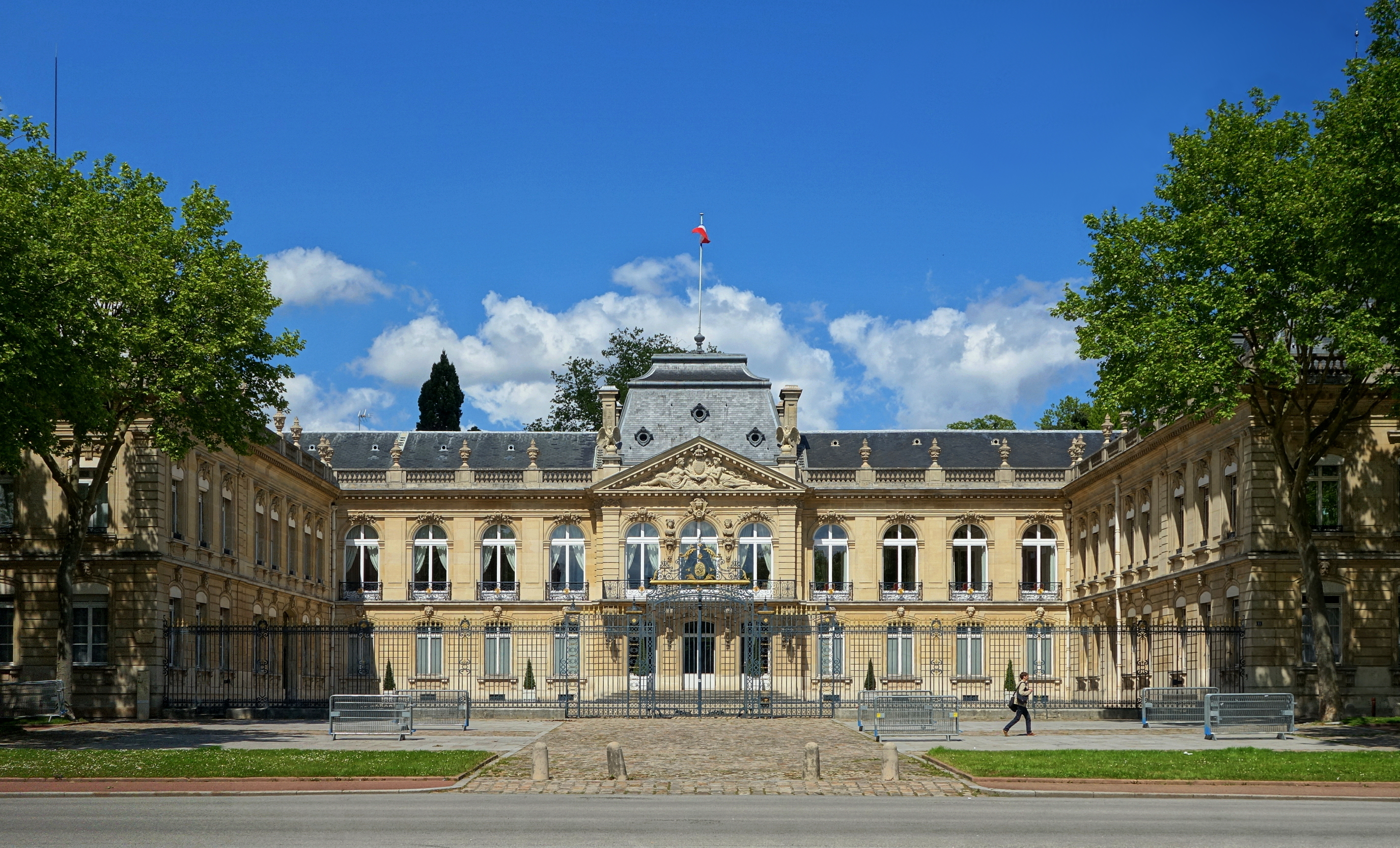
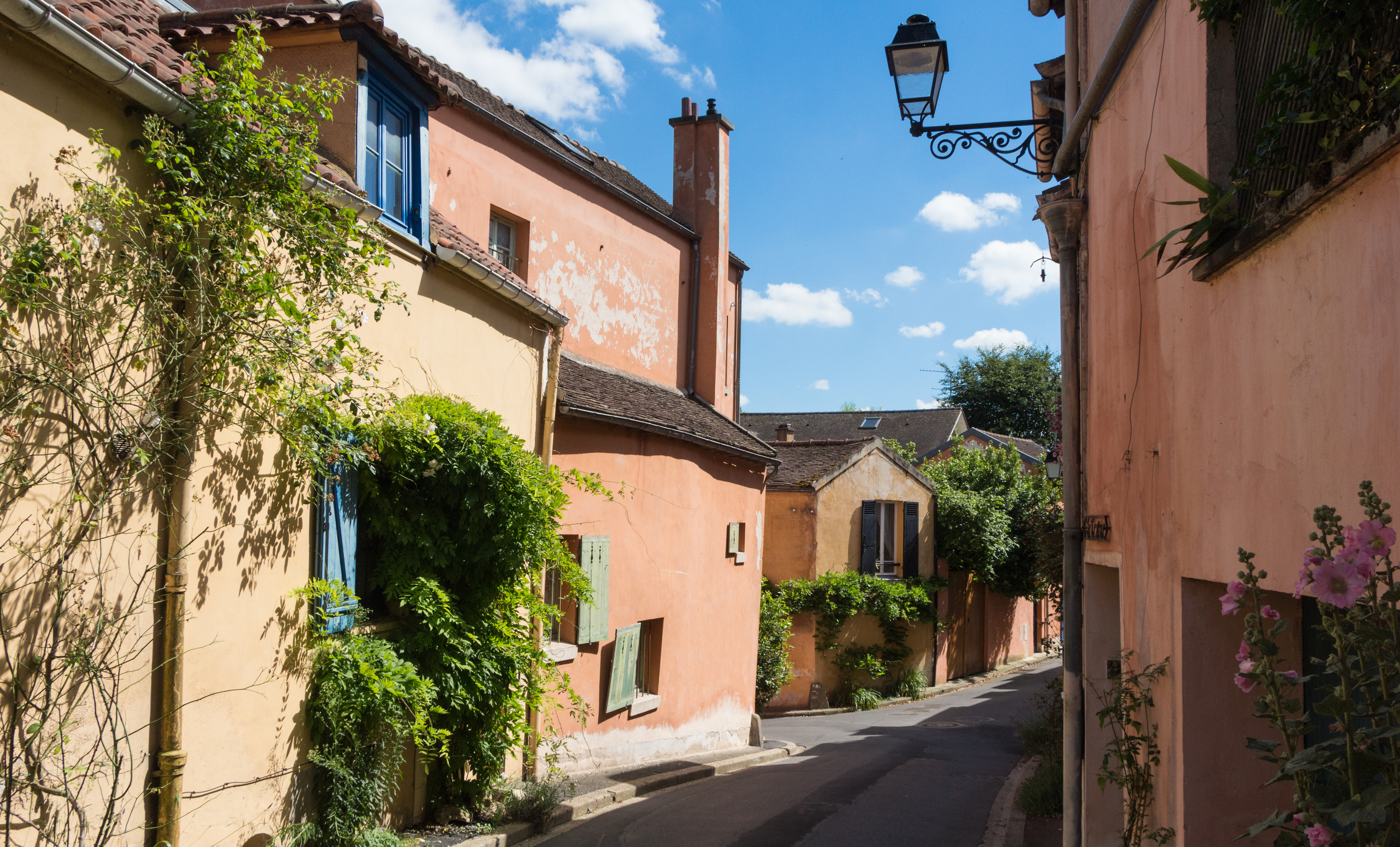
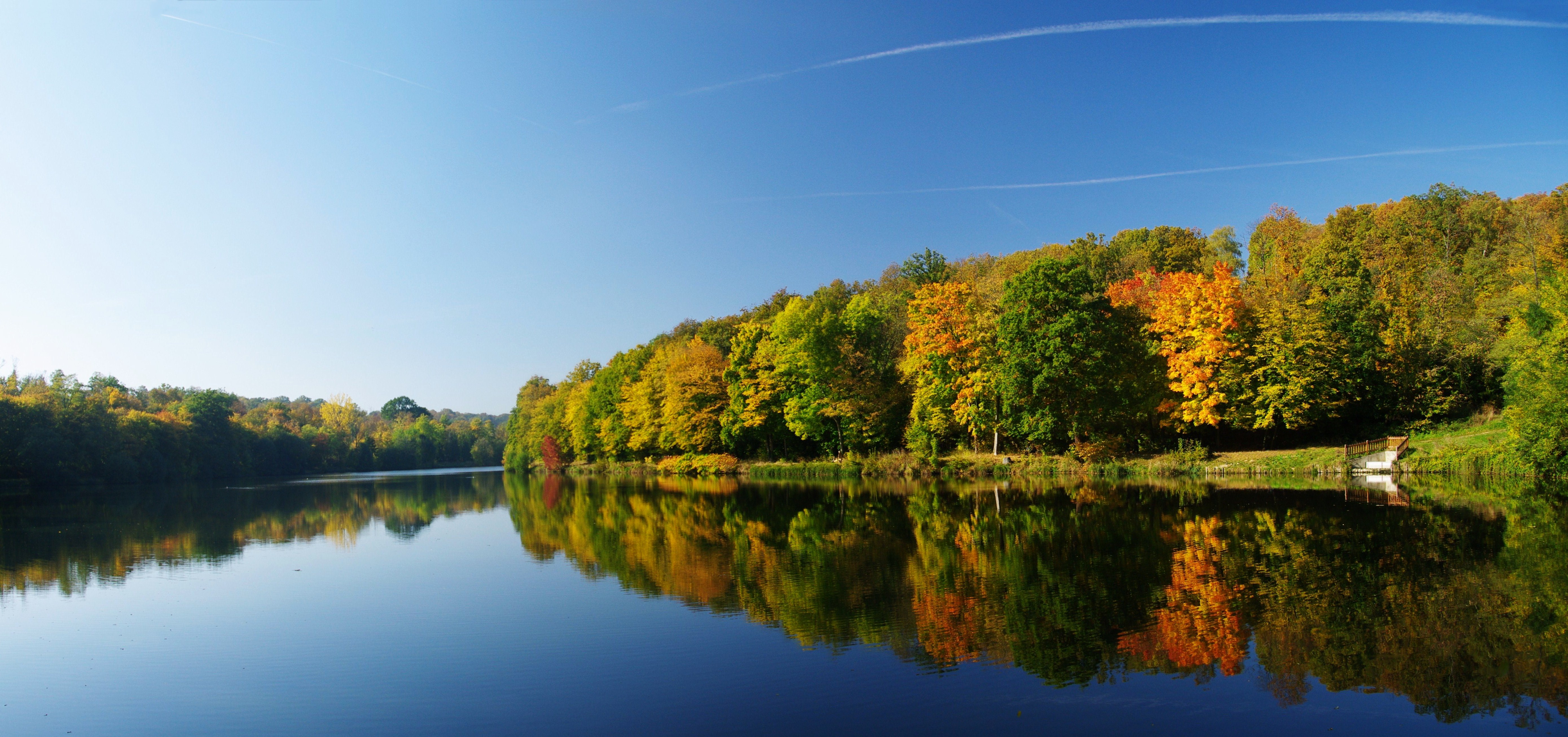
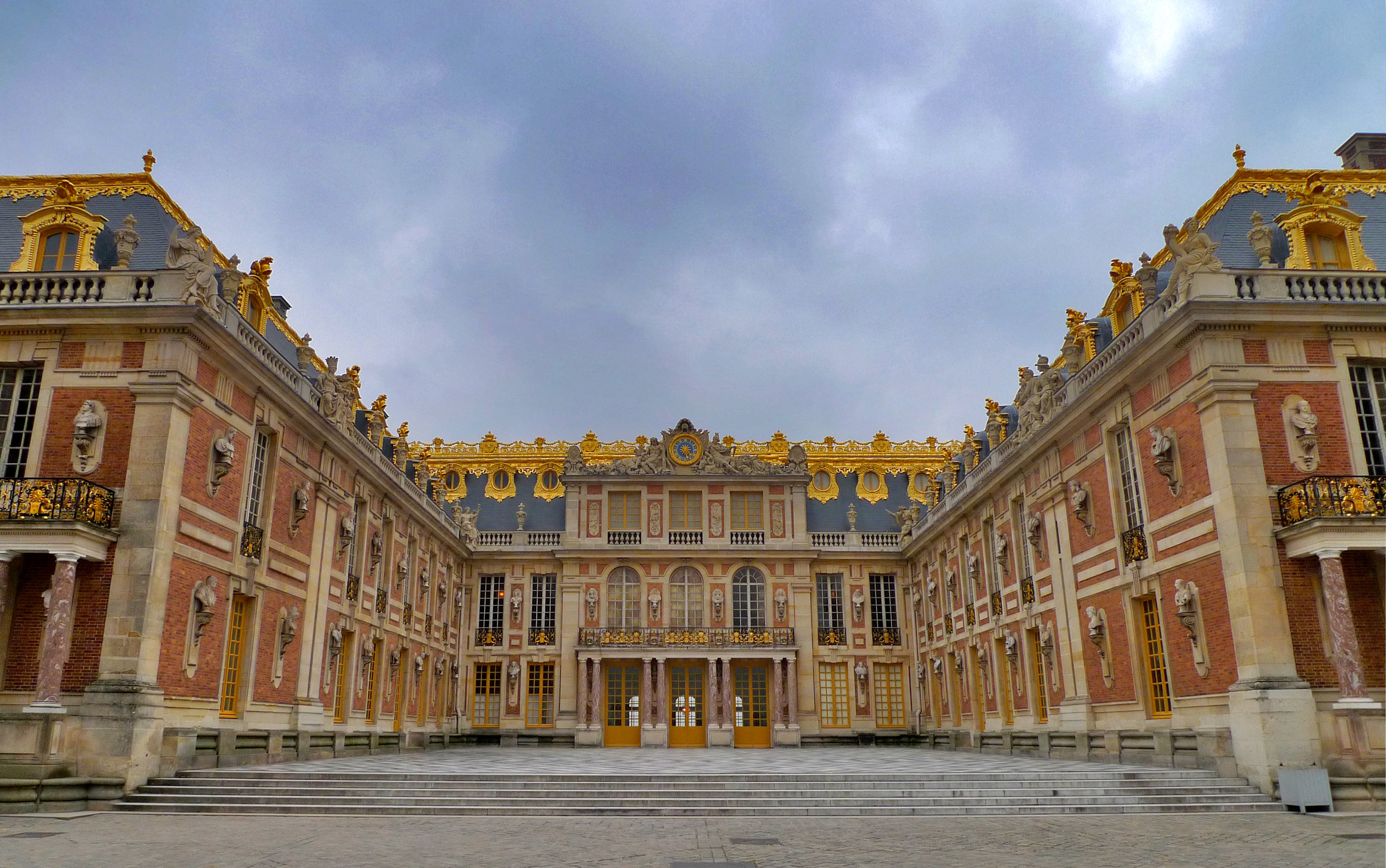
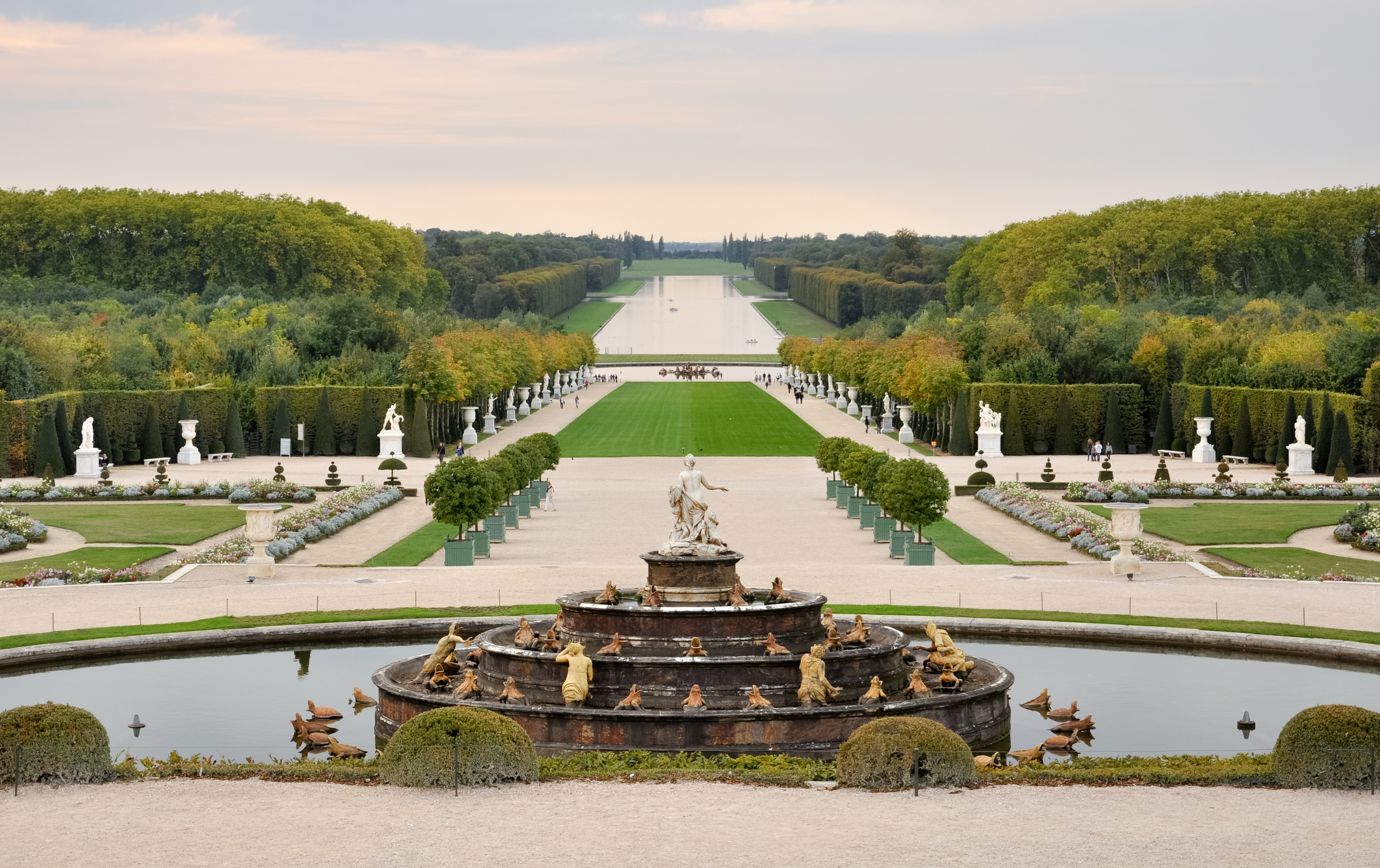
- From top down, left to right: prefecture building in Versailles, view of La Celle-Saint-Cloud, forest and lake in Guyancourt, marble courtyard and gardens of the Palace of Versailles

- Flag Coat of arms

- Location of Yvelines in France
- Coordinates: 48°50′N 1°55′E
- Country: France
- Region: Île-de-France
- Prefecture: Versailles
- Subprefectures: Mantes-la-Jolie; Rambouillet; Saint-Germain- en-Laye

Government
  - President of the Departmental Council: Pierre Bédier (LR)

Area^{1}
  - Total: 2,284 km^{2} (882 sq mi)

Population (2023)
  - Total: 1,485,086
  - Rank: 8th
  - Density: 650.2/km^{2} (1,684/sq mi)

GDP
  - Total: €60.058 billion (2021)
  - Per capita: €42,238 (2021)
- Time zone: UTC+1 (CET)
  - Summer (DST): UTC+2 (CEST)
- Department number: 78
- Arrondissements: 4
- Cantons: 21
- Communes: 259
- ^1 French Land Register data, which exclude estuaries and lakes, ponds and glaciers larger than 1 km^{2}.

Yvelines (French pronunciation: [ivlin]) is a department in the western part of the Île-de-France region in Northern France. In 2023, it had a population of 1,485,086. Its prefecture is Versailles, home to the Palace of Versailles, the principal residence of the King of France from 1682 until 1789, a UNESCO World Heritage Site since 1979. Yvelines's subprefectures are Saint-Germain-en-Laye, Mantes-la-Jolie and Rambouillet. Yvelines was created on 1 January 1968 from the western part of the former department of Seine-et-Oise.

== History ==
Yvelines was created from the western part of the former department of Seine-et-Oise on 1 January 1968 in accordance with a law passed on 10 January 1964 and a décret d'application (a decree specifying how a law should be enforced) from 26 February 1965. It inherited Seine-et-Oise's official number of 78 since it took up the largest portion of its territory. In addition to this, it inherited Seine-et-Oise's prefecture, Versailles.

Yvelines derives its name from the Forest of Yveline, next to Rambouillet.

It gained the communes of Châteaufort and Toussus-le-Noble from the adjacent department of Essonne in 1969.

The departmental capital, Versailles, which grew up around Louis XIV's château, was also the French capital for more than a century under the Ancien Régime and again between 1871 and 1879 during the early years of the Third Republic. Since then the château has continued to welcome the French Parliament when it is called upon to sit in a congressional sitting (with both houses sitting together) in order to enact constitutional changes or to listen to a formal declaration by the President.

== Geography ==
=== Situation ===
Yvelines is bordered by the departments of Val-d'Oise on the north, Hauts-de-Seine on the east, Essonne on the southeast, Eure-et-Loir on the southwest and Eure on the west.

The eastern part of the department, as well as its northern part along the Seine, is part of the Paris metropolitan area, but the rest of the department is rural, much of it covered by the Forest of Rambouillet (also known as the Forest of Yveline, from which the name of the department is derived).

Two regional parks can be found in Yvelines: Haute Vallée de Chevreuse Regional Natural Park and part of Vexin Français Park. Yvelines is home to one of France's best known golf courses, La Tuilerie-Bignon, in the village of Saint-Nom-la-Bretèche.

=== Principal towns ===
Besides Versailles (the prefecture and most populous commune) and the subprefectures of Mantes-la-Jolie, Rambouillet, and Saint-Germain-en-Laye, important cities include Conflans-Sainte-Honorine, Poissy, Les Mureaux, Houilles, Plaisir, Sartrouville, Chatou, Le Chesnay, and the new agglomeration community of Saint-Quentin-en-Yvelines. As of 2023, there are 24 communes with more than 20,000 inhabitants. The 10 most populous communes are:

Commune	Population (2023)
Versailles	84,095
Sartrouville	52,763
Saint-Germain-en-Laye	45,931
Mantes-la-Jolie	43,526
Poissy	40,983
Conflans-Sainte-Honorine	36,958
Trappes	34,689
Les Mureaux	34,632
Houilles	33,983
Montigny-le-Bretonneux	32,465

== Demographics ==
In French, a man from the Yvelines is called Yvelinois (plural Yvelinois); a woman is Yvelinoise (plural Yvelinoises).

=== Population development since 1876 ===
Population data refer to the department in its geography as of January 2025.

Historical population

Year	Pop.	±% p.a.
1876	235,511	—
1881	236,471	+0.08%
1891	250,552	+0.58%
1901	270,228	+0.76%
1911	297,562	+0.97%
1921	321,237	+0.77%
1931	408,282	+2.43%
1936	428,166	+0.96%
1946	431,499	+0.08%
1954	519,976	+2.36%

Year	Pop.	±% p.a.
1962	687,827	+3.56%
1968	854,382	+3.68%
1975	1,082,255	+3.44%
1982	1,196,111	+1.44%
1990	1,307,150	+1.12%
1999	1,354,304	+0.39%
2007	1,403,957	+0.45%
2012	1,412,356	+0.12%
2017	1,438,266	+0.36%
2023	1,485,086	+0.54%

=== Place of birth of residents ===
Place of birth of residents of Yvelines in 1999
Born in metropolitan France	Born outside metropolitan France			
85.5%	14.5%			
85.5%	Born in overseas France	Born in foreign countries with French citizenship at birth^{1}	EU-15 immigrants^{2}	Non-EU-15 immigrants
85.5%	1.1%	3.0%	4.2%	6.2%
^{1} This group is made up largely of former French settlers, such as pieds-noirs in Northwest Africa, followed by former colonial citizens who had French citizenship at birth (such as was often the case for the native elite in French colonies), as well as to a lesser extent foreign-born children of French expatriates. A foreign country is understood as a country not part of France in 1999, so a person born for example in 1950 in Algeria, when Algeria was an integral part of France, is nonetheless listed as a person born in a foreign country in French statistics.^{2} An immigrant is a person born in a foreign country not having French citizenship at birth. An immigrant may have acquired French citizenship since moving to France, but is still considered an immigrant in French statistics. On the other hand, persons born in France with foreign citizenship (the children of immigrants) are not listed as immigrants.

== Tourism ==
=== Palaces and châteaux ===
- Palace of Versailles
- Château de Breteuil
- Château du Haut-Buc
- Château de Dampierre
- Château de Jouy-en-Josas
- Château de Maisons
- Château de Rambouillet
- Château de Saint-Germain-en-Laye
- Château of Thoiry
- Château de Vaux-sur-Seine
- Château de Mauvières
- Château du Pont
- Château de Villette
- Château de Millemont

=== Museums ===
- Museum of National Antiques (Saint-Germain-en-Laye)
- Museum of River and Canal Craft (Conflans-Sainte-Honorine)
- Horse-drawn Coach Museum (Versailles)
- Toy Museum (Poissy)
- Sheep Museum (Rambouillet)
- Cloth Museum of Jouy (Jouy-en-Josas)
- National Barn Museum of Port-Royal (Magny-les-Hameaux)
- International Museum of Naive Art
- Musée Lambinet (Versailles)
- Musée de la Grenouillère (Croissy-sur-Seine)
- Musée Fournaise (Chatou)

=== Artists' and writers' houses ===
- Maurice Denis's house, the Musée départemental Maurice Denis (Saint-Germain-en-Laye)
- André Derain's house (Chambourcy)
- Alexandre Dumas père's Château de Monte-Cristo (Port-Marly)
- Maurice Ravel's house/museum (Montfort-l'Amaury)
- Jean-Claude Richard's family estate (Saint-Nom-la-Bretèche)
- Elsa Triolet-Aragon's house (Saint-Arnoult-en-Yvelines)
- Ivan Turgenev House (Bougival)
- Émile Zola's house (Médan)

=== Parks and gardens ===
- Chèvreloup Arboretum (Rocquencourt)
- Marly Estate (Marly-le-Roi)
- Vaux-sur-Seine Castle Garden (Vaux-sur-Seine)
- The King's Vegetable Garden (Versailles)
- Outdoor and entertainment base of Saint-Quentin-en-Yvelines (Trappes)
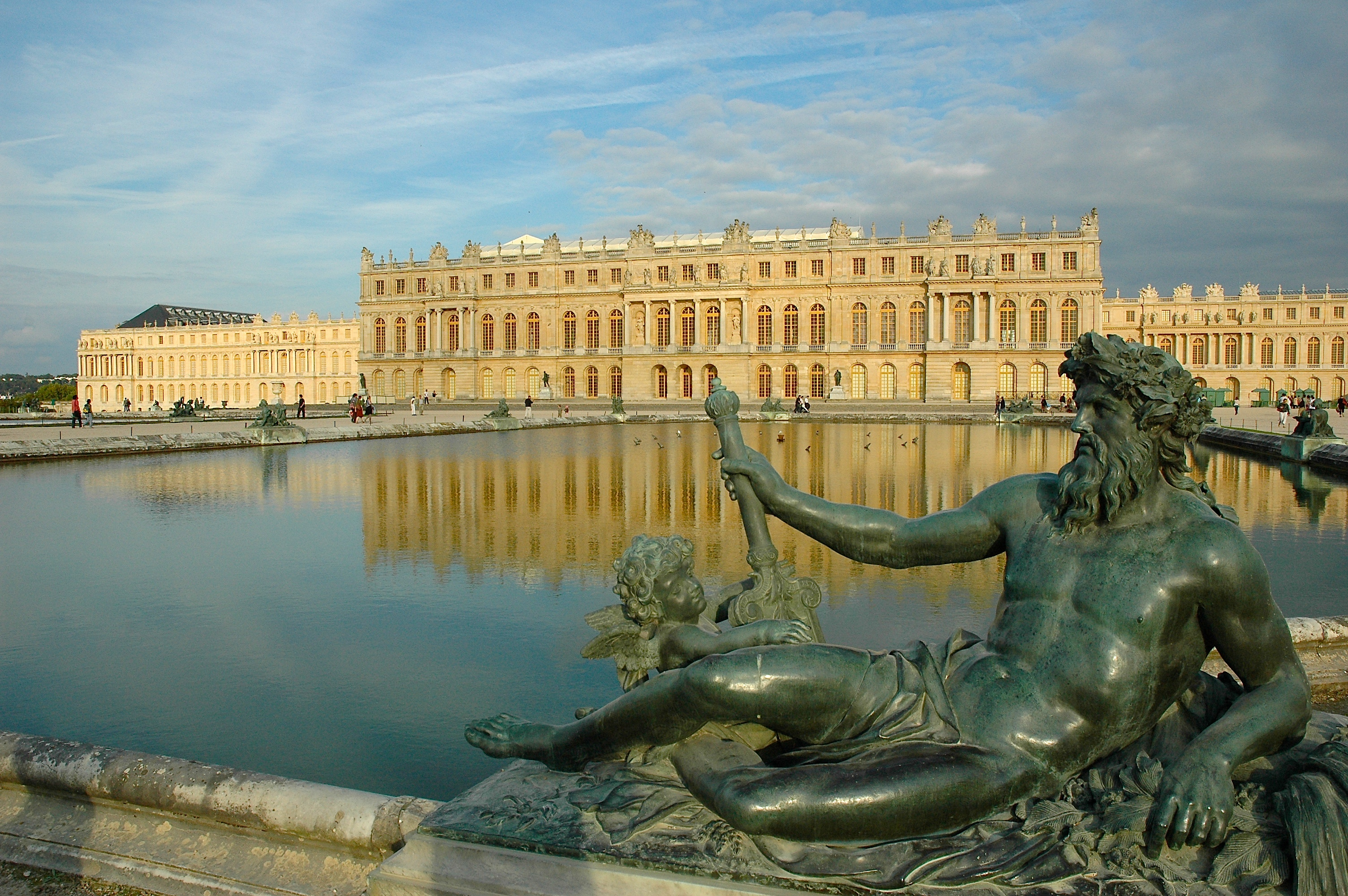
Palace and Gardens of Versailles

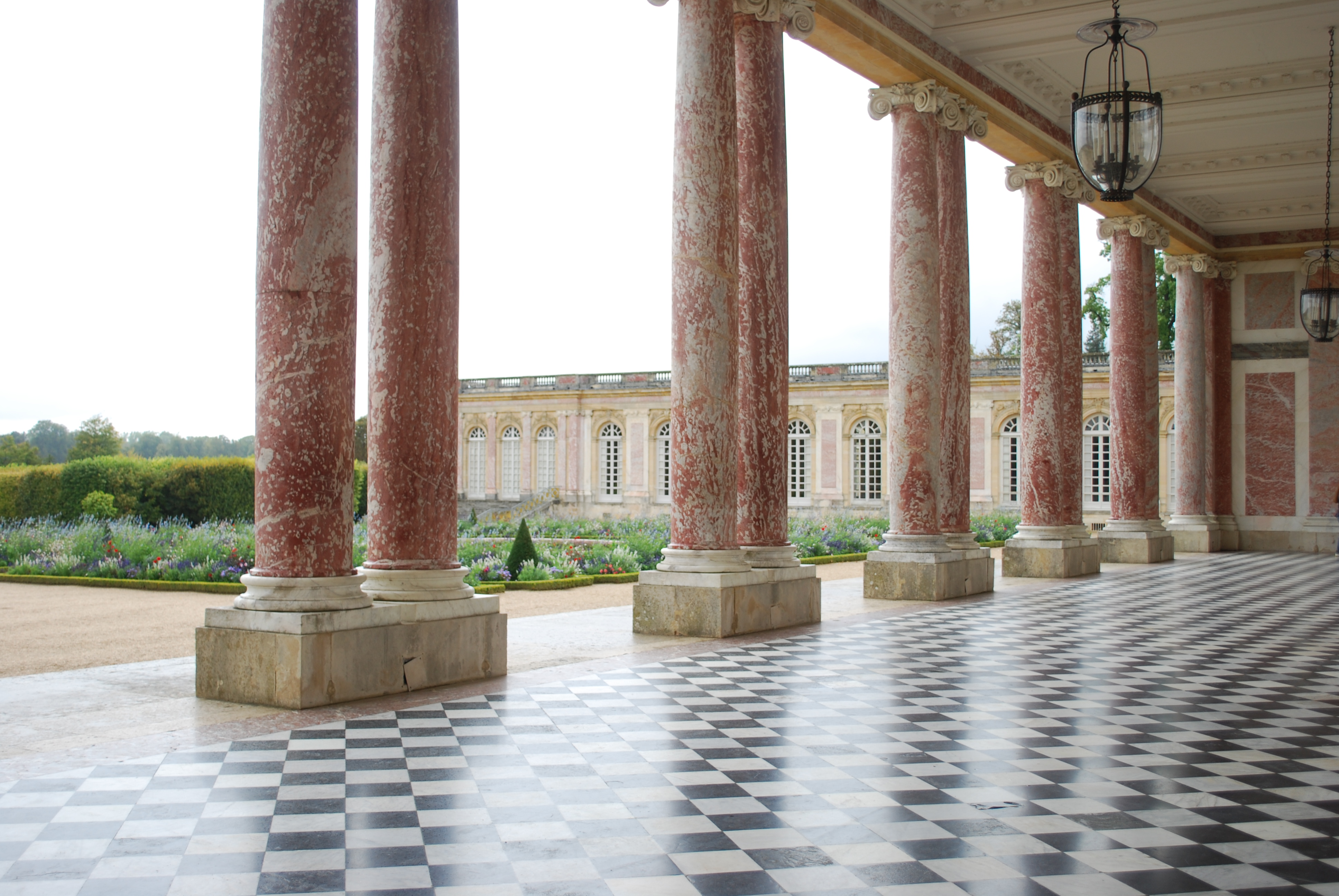
The Grand Trianon

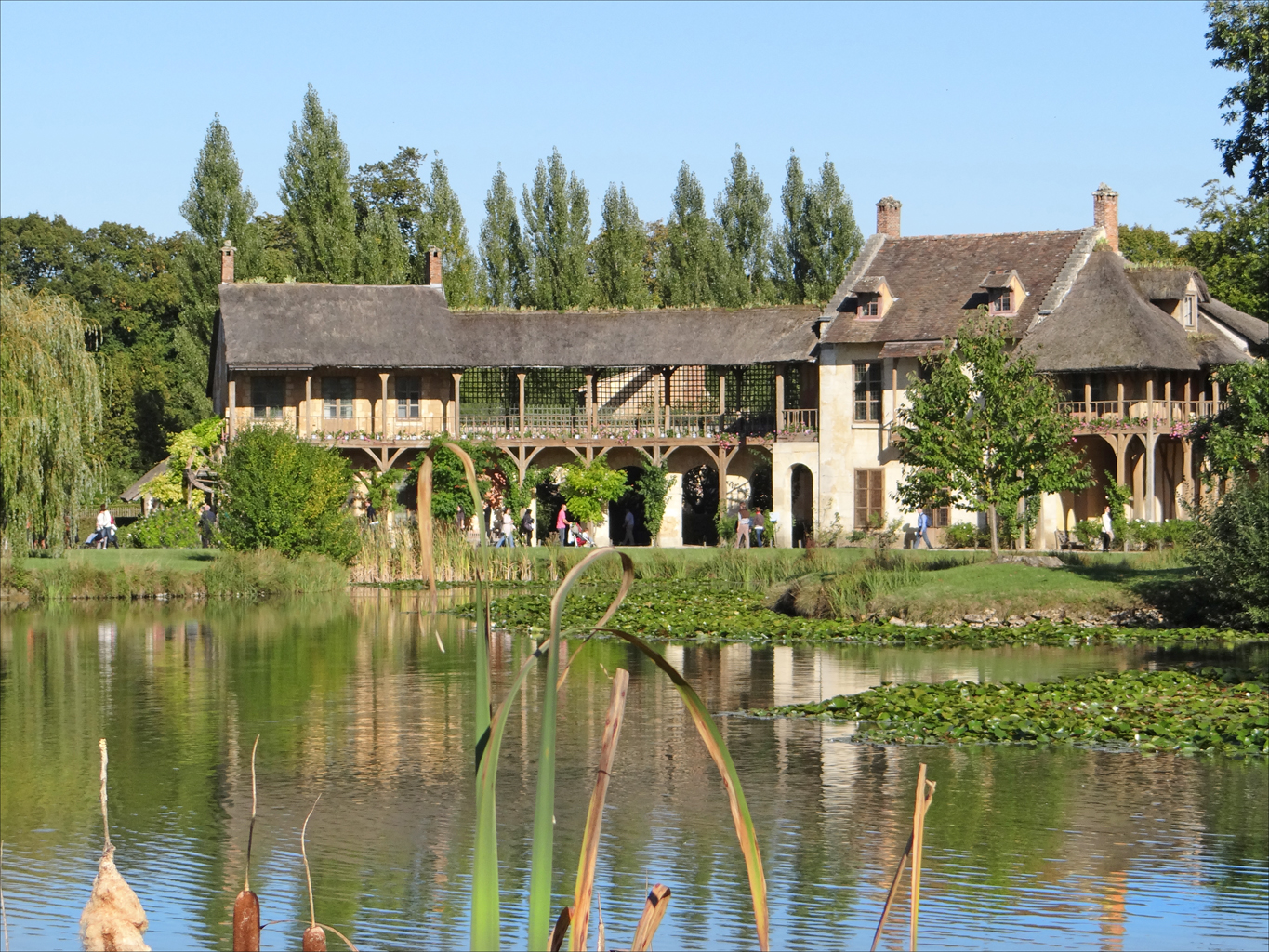
The Hameau de la Reine

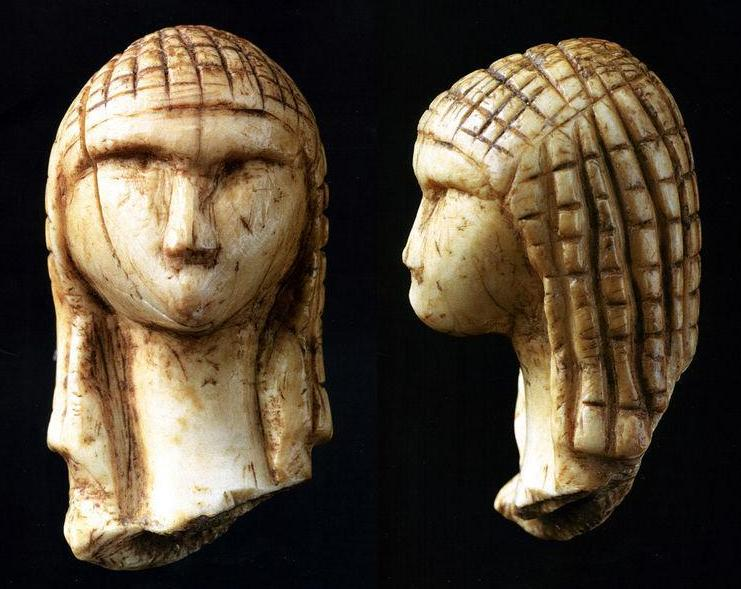
The Venus of Brassempouy from the collection of the Château de Saint-Germain-en-Laye

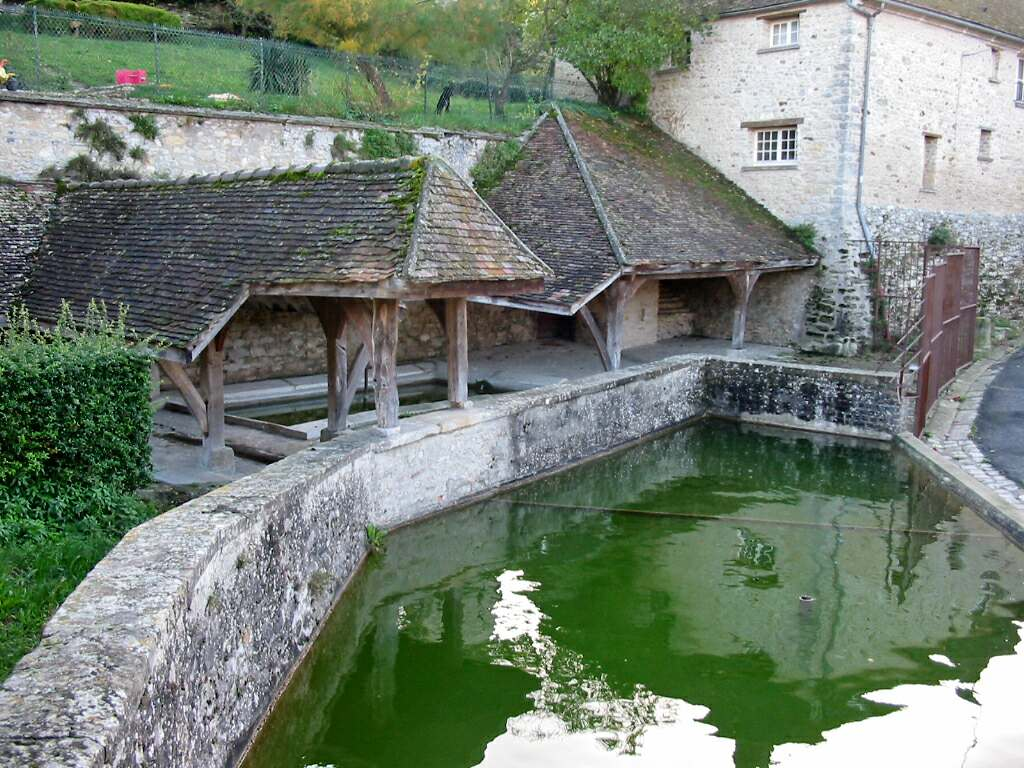
Lavoir of Jumeauville

== Politics ==
In both local and national elections, the department generally supports centre-right political candidates. The president of the Departmental Council of Yvelines is Pierre Bédier of The Republicans (LR), first elected in 2014.

Michel Rocard, who served as Prime Minister of France from 1988 to 1991 under President François Mitterrand, was a deputy for the department for the Socialist Party. As of 2026 both the President of the National Assembly (Yaël Braun-Pivet) and President of the Senate (Gérard Larcher) represent Yvelines in Parliament.

=== Presidential elections (2nd round) results since 1995 ===
Election	Winning candidate	Party	%	2nd place candidate	Party	%
2022	Emmanuel Macron	LREM	71.05	Marine Le Pen	FN	28.95
2017	Emmanuel Macron	LREM	77.15	Marine Le Pen	FN	22.85
2012	Nicolas Sarkozy	UMP	54.30	François Hollande	PS	45.70
2007	Nicolas Sarkozy	UMP	58.71	Ségolène Royal	PS	41.29
2002	Jacques Chirac	RPR	85.59	Jean-Marie Le Pen	FN	14.41
1995	Jacques Chirac	RPR	60.64	Lionel Jospin	PS	39.36

=== Representation ===
==== National Assembly ====
Yvelines is represented by the following deputies in the National Assembly:

Constituency	Member	Party
Yvelines's 1st	Charles Rodwell	RE
Yvelines's 2nd	Anne Bergantz	MoDem
Yvelines's 3rd	Béatrice Piron	RE
Yvelines's 4th	Marie Lebec	RE
Yvelines's 5th	Yaël Braun-Pivet	RE
Yvelines's 6th	Natalia Pouzyreff	RE
Yvelines's 7th	Aurélien Rousseau	PP
Yvelines's 8th	Benjamin Lucas	G.s.
Yvelines's 9th	Dieynaba Diop	PS
Yvelines's 10th	Aurore Bergé	RE
Yvelines's 11th	William Martinet	LFI
Yvelines's 12th	Karl Olive	RE

==== Senate ====
In the Senate, Yvelines is represented by:

Senator	Party	Since
Marta de Cidrac	LR	2017
Gérard Larcher	LR	2007
Michel Laugier	UDI	2017
Martin Lévrier	RE	2017
Sophie Primas	LR	2025
Ghislaine Senée	LE	2023

== See also ==
- Cantons of the Yvelines department
- Communes of the Yvelines department
- Arrondissements of the Yvelines department
