= 2024 French legislative election in Yvelines =

Following the first round of the 2024 French legislative election on 30 June 2024, runoff elections in each constituency where no candidate received a vote share greater than 50 percent were scheduled for 7 July. Candidates permitted to stand in the runoff elections needed to either come in first or second place in the first round or achieve more than 12.5 percent of the votes of the entire electorate (as opposed to 12.5 percent of the vote share due to low turnout).

== Yvelines ==
=== 1st constituency ===
Candidate	Party or alliance		First round		Second round	
Candidate	Party or alliance		Votes	%	Votes	%
Charles Rodwell	Ensemble	Renaissance	20,235	33.55	27,403	46.90
Sébastien Ramage	New Popular Front	La France Insoumise	17,073	28.31	16,828	28.80
Anne Jacqmin	National Rally		11,686	19.37	14,195	24.30
Arnaud Poulain	The Republicans		9,783	16.22		
Sabine Clément	Reconquête		868	1.44		
Jean-Loup Leroux	Far-left	Lutte Ouvrière	523	0.87		
Guillaume Carlier	Miscellaneous centre	Independent	147	0.24		
Total			60,315	100.00	58,426	100.00
Valid votes			60,315	98.41	58,426	97.71
Invalid votes			231	0.38	278	0.46
Blank votes			744	1.21	1,092	1.83
Total votes			61,290	100.00	59,796	100.00
Registered voters/turnout			84,208	72.78	84,214	71.00

=== 2nd constituency ===
Candidate	Party or alliance		First round		Second round	
Candidate	Party or alliance		Votes	%	Votes	%
Jean-Noël Barrot	Ensemble	Democratic Movement	22,500	35.01	43,607	72.69
Maïté Carrive-Bedouani	New Popular Front	The Ecologists	16,893	26.29		
Gaetan Brault	National Rally		14,013	21.81	16,383	27.31
Pascal Thévenot	The Republicans		9,327	14.51		
Philippe Loire	Reconquête		893	1.39		
Marielle Saulnier	Far-left	Lutte Ouvrière	486	0.76		
Bertrand Hugon	Independent		153	0.24		
Total			64,265	100.00	59,990	100.00
Valid votes			64,265	98.50	59,990	95.39
Invalid votes			275	0.42	583	0.93
Blank votes			701	1.07	2,318	3.69
Total votes			65,241	100.00	62,891	100.00
Registered voters/turnout			86,979	75.01	86,991	72.30

=== 3rd constituency ===
Candidate	Party or alliance		First round		Second round	
Candidate	Party or alliance		Votes	%	Votes	%
Béatrice Piron	Ensemble	Renaissance	20,768	34.49	38,824	68.75
Valentin Salvino	Union of the far right	The Republicans	13,725	22.79	17,648	31.25
Thomas Ciano	New Popular Front	Socialist Party	12,557	20.85		
Othman Nasrou	The Republicans		10,211	16.96		
Jérémy Bizet	Ecologists	Independent	1,679	2.79		
Olivier Le Coq	Reconquête		998	1.66		
Olivier Augustin	Far-left	Lutte Ouvrière	283	0.47		
Total			60,221	100.00	56,472	100.00
Valid votes			60,221	98.63	56,472	95.99
Invalid votes			242	0.40	485	0.82
Blank votes			592	0.97	1,876	3.19
Total votes			61,055	100.00	58,833	100.00
Registered voters/turnout			83,521	73.10	83,538	70.43

=== 4th constituency ===
Candidate	Party or alliance		First round		Second round	
Candidate	Party or alliance		Votes	%	Votes	%
Marie Lebec	Ensemble	Renaissance	23,932	41.24	28,306	50.67
Céline Bourdon	New Popular Front	La France Insoumise	15,787	27.21	15,066	26.97
Jean-François Mourtoux	Union of the far right	The Republicans	11,599	19.99	12,486	22.35
Anne-Sophie Ho Massat	The Republicans		5,383	9.28		
Manon Bardy	Reconquête		835	1.44		
Franck Maurel	Far-left	Lutte Ouvrière	489	0.84		
James Poggia	Independent		2	0.00		
Total			58,027	100.00	55,858	100.00
Valid votes			58,027	98.14	55,858	97.75
Invalid votes			269	0.45	286	0.50
Blank votes			833	1.41	998	1.75
Total votes			59,129	100.00	57,142	100.00
Registered voters/turnout			80,858	73.13	80,881	70.65

=== 5th constituency ===
Candidate	Party or alliance		First round		Second round	
Candidate	Party or alliance		Votes	%	Votes	%
Yaël Braun-Pivet	Ensemble	Renaissance	22,874	42.79	25,400	49.10
Yassine Benyettou	New Popular Front	La France Insoumise	14,600	27.31	14,564	28.16
Jacques Myard	Union of the far right	The Republicans	12,241	22.90	11,763	22.74
Emilienne Guille	Reconquête		1,826	3.42		
Nathalie Lepage	Miscellaneous centre	Independent	942	1.76		
Alain Lépicier	Far-left	Lutte Ouvrière	454	0.85		
Ingrid Larose	Miscellaneous centre	Independent	430	0.80		
Serilo Looky	Miscellaneous left	Independent	84	0.16		
Total			53,451	100.00	51,727	100.00
Valid votes			53,451	97.83	51,727	98.03
Invalid votes			235	0.43	226	0.43
Blank votes			949	1.74	812	1.54
Total votes			54,635	100.00	52,765	100.00
Registered voters/turnout			76,766	71.17	76,785	68.72

=== 6th constituency ===
Candidate	Party or alliance		First round		Second round	
Candidate	Party or alliance		Votes	%	Votes	%
Natalia Pouzyreff	Ensemble	Renaissance	20,212	38.33	24,322	47.83
Mélinda Sauger	New Popular Front	La France Insoumise	14,247	27.02	14,837	29.18
Sophie Lelandais	National Rally		10,781	20.45	11,693	22.99
Stéphane Torrez	The Republicans		4,028	7.64		
Jean-Luc Suzé	Ecologists	Independent	1,668	3.16		
Anne-Elisabeth Sild	Reconquête		760	1.44		
Claire Coueignas	Sovereigntist right	Debout la France	533	1.01		
Cécile Perraudin	Far-left	Lutte Ouvrière	222	0.42		
Ken Armède	Far-left	New Anticapitalist Party (Note: Dissident who ran without the support of the New Popular Front)	120	0.23		
Patrice Hernot	Miscellaneous right	Independent	84	0.16		
Marc Philipot	Independent		71	0.13		
Leo Müllbacher	Independent		0	0.00		
Total			52,726	100.00	50,852	100.00
Valid votes			52,726	98.40	50,852	97.57
Invalid votes			233	0.43	311	0.60
Blank votes			623	1.16	955	1.83
Total votes			53,582	100.00	52,118	100.00
Registered voters/turnout			77,096	69.50	77,122	67.58

=== 7th constituency ===
Candidate	Party or alliance		First round		Second round	
Candidate	Party or alliance		Votes	%	Votes	%
Aurélien Rousseau	New Popular Front	Place Publique	18,810	34.68	21,043	39.14
Nadia Hai	Ensemble	Renaissance	15,903	29.32	17,711	32.95
Babette de Rozières	Union of the far right	The Republicans	13,987	25.79	15,004	27.91
Julien Fréjabue	The Republicans		4,142	7.64		
Colette Aubrée	Reconquête		516	0.95		
Ali Kaya	Far-left	Lutte Ouvrière	498	0.92		
Jack Lefebvre	Far-left	Independent	375	0.69		
Total			54,231	100.00	53,758	100.00
Valid votes			54,231	97.88	53,758	97.71
Invalid votes			283	0.51	272	0.49
Blank votes			893	1.61	989	1.80
Total votes			55,407	100.00	55,019	100.00
Registered voters/turnout			81,613	67.89	81,635	67.40

=== 8th constituency ===
Candidate	Party or alliance		First round		Second round	
Candidate	Party or alliance		Votes	%	Votes	%
Benjamin Lucas	New Popular Front	Génération.s	20,416	44.92	27,801	63.55
Cyril Nauth	National Rally		14,076	30.97	15,948	36.45
Alexis Costa	Ensemble	Renaissance	6,436	14.16		
Stephan Champagne	The Republicans		2,592	5.70		
Sabah El Asri	Miscellaneous right	Independent	1,208	2.66		
Thierry Gonnot	Far-left	Lutte Ouvrière	526	1.16		
Nicolas Mangani	Independent		187	0.41		
Hugues Bovaere	Reconquête		8	0.02		
Léon Chevalier	Independent		3	0.01		
Total			45,452	100.00	43,749	100.00
Valid votes			45,452	97.43	43,749	93.87
Invalid votes			389	0.83	618	1.33
Blank votes			810	1.74	2,238	4.80
Total votes			46,651	100.00	46,605	100.00
Registered voters/turnout			75,347	61.91	75,365	61.84

=== 9th constituency ===
Candidate	Party or alliance		First round		Second round	
Candidate	Party or alliance		Votes	%	Votes	%
Laurent Morin	National Rally		21,551	34.49	26,477	46.03
Dieynaba Diop	New Popular Front	Socialist Party	18,520	29.64	31,042	53.97
Bruno Millienne	Ensemble	Democratic Movement	13,340	21.35		
Hervé Riou	Miscellaneous right	The Republicans	5,563	8.90		
Rachid Zerouali	Ecologists	Independent	1,780	2.85		
Christophe Le Hot	Reconquête		802	1.28		
Philippe Gommard	Far-left	Lutte Ouvrière	601	0.96		
Sendil-Sébastien Djéaramane	Independent		336	0.54		
Total			62,493	100.00	57,519	100.00
Valid votes			62,493	97.78	57,519	90.71
Invalid votes			381	0.60	1,025	1.62
Blank votes			1,037	1.62	4,863	7.67
Total votes			63,911	100.00	63,407	100.00
Registered voters/turnout			94,123	67.90	94,147	67.35

=== 10th constituency ===
Candidate	Party or alliance		First round		Second round	
Candidate	Party or alliance		Votes	%	Votes	%
Aurore Bergé	Ensemble	Renaissance	22,367	33.59	32,048	49.05
Thomas du Chalard	National Rally		18,795	28.22	21,035	32.19
Cédric Briolais	New Popular Front	La France Insoumise	14,918	22.40	12,255	18.76
Gaël Barbotin	The Republicans		5,797	8.71		
Julien Gautrelet	Miscellaneous left	Radical Party of the Left (Note: Dissident who ran without the support of the New Popular Front)	2,260	3.39		
Ethel Fournier-Campion	Ecologists	Independent	1,141	1.71		
Olivier Gousseau	Reconquête		894	1.34		
Hélène Janisset	Far-left	Lutte Ouvrière	421	0.63		
Total			66,593	100.00	65,338	100.00
Valid votes			66,593	98.23	65,338	97.43
Invalid votes			326	0.48	388	0.58
Blank votes			872	1.29	1,338	2.00
Total votes			67,791	100.00	67,064	100.00
Registered voters/turnout			92,480	73.30	92,504	72.50

=== 11th constituency ===
Candidate	Party or alliance		First round		Second round	
Candidate	Party or alliance		Votes	%	Votes	%
William Martinet	New Popular Front	La France Insoumise	20,395	43.38	22,035	49.84
Laurent Mazaury	Ensemble	Union of Democrats and Independents	13,752	29.25	22,175	50.16
Victoria Doucet	National Rally		10,243	21.79		
Sarah Nicos	Independent		1,048	2.23		
Nathalie Machuca	Reconquête		900	1.91		
Patrick Planque	Far-left	Lutte Ouvrière	507	1.08		
Boris Lutz	Sovereigntist right	Independent	166	0.35		
Total			47,011	100.00	44,210	100.00
Valid votes			47,011	97.68	44,210	94.85
Invalid votes			300	0.62	560	1.20
Blank votes			816	1.70	1,840	3.95
Total votes			48,127	100.00	46,610	100.00
Registered voters/turnout			70,630	68.14	70,651	65.97

=== 12th constituency ===
Candidate	Party or alliance		First round		Second round	
Candidate	Party or alliance		Votes	%	Votes	%
Karl Olive	Ensemble	Renaissance	20,610	40.75	22,452	45.07
Christophe Massiaux	New Popular Front	The Ecologists	15,333	30.32	15,375	30.86
Jean-Louis Mettelet	National Rally		12,585	24.88	11,993	24.07
Bruno Jay	Reconquête		743	1.47		
Jean-Pierre Mercier	Far-left	Lutte Ouvrière	537	1.06		
Patrick Scieller	Independent		400	0.79		
Diabe Kamara	Miscellaneous left	Independent	369	0.73		
Total			50,577	100.00	49,820	100.00
Valid votes			50,577	97.89	49,820	98.16
Invalid votes			268	0.52	208	0.41
Blank votes			820	1.59	728	1.43
Total votes			51,665	100.00	50,756	100.00
Registered voters/turnout			72,340	71.42	72,353	70.15
