= Fresh pavilion =

Folly belonging to the Palace of Versailles complex

- Pavillon frais (French)
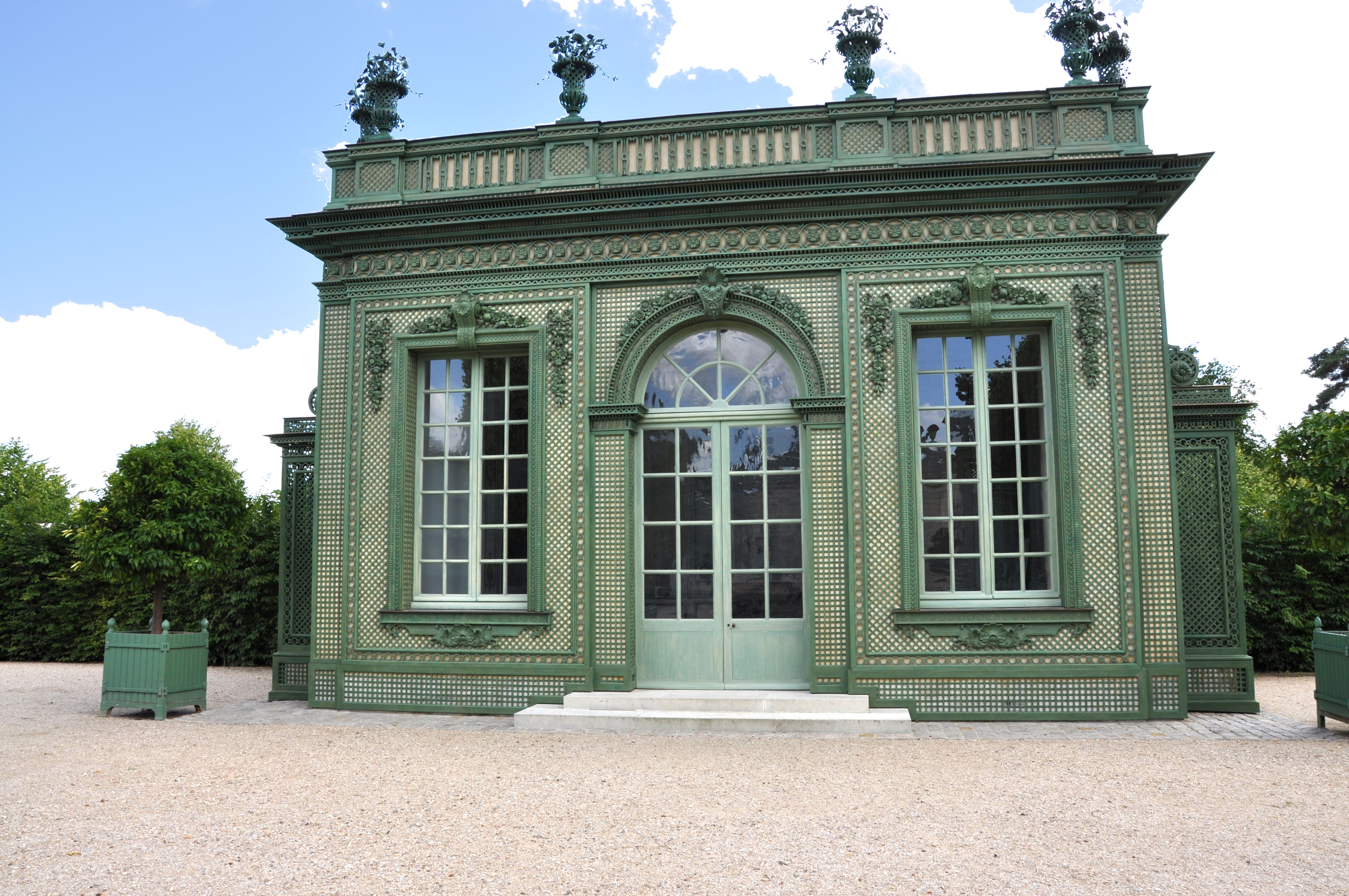
- View of the Fresh pavilion façade

- Location within Île-de-France (region) Location within France
- 48°48′53″N 02°6′28″E
- Location: France; Île-de-France region Yvelines department Versailles commune

History
- Built: 1753
- Rebuilt: 1984

Site notes
- Architect: Ange-Jacques Gabriel
- Owner: French Government

Monument historique
- Part of: Garden of Versailles
- Original purpose: Summer dining area
- Current purpose: Museum
- Website: www.chateauversailles.fr

The Fresh pavilion, Fresh salon (Note: It is also sometimes called the "Pavillon des fraîcheurs" (freshness pavilion) or the "Pavillon de treillage" (trellis pavilion).) or Pavillon frais (in French) is a folly built for Louis XV and Madame de Pompadour by Ange-Jacques Gabriel in the French Garden of the Petit Trianon, in the grounds of the Château de Versailles.

Built between 1751 and 1753, this new building on this small estate, desired by the King to get away from the constraints of the Court, faces the French pavilion and served as a summer dining room where guests could "take fresh air" and enjoy produce from the nearby kitchen garden. This one-room pavilion was designed as green architecture and is entirely covered with green trellis. It features a rectangular, symmetrical garden surrounded by arcades topped by basket-shaped vases, creating an architectural and horticultural harmony. Two small oval basins at the ends of the flowerbeds complete the decor.

Abandoned to weathering and degradation during the French Revolution, the pavilion was razed in 1810 and the garden replaced by lawn. In the 1980s and again in 2010, thanks to sponsorship and after an archaeological campaign, it was entirely rebuilt on the original model, with the original garden design faithfully reproduced. Only the arcades have not yet been restored.

== Construction ==
On the death of his beloved Madame de Châteauroux in 1744, King Louis XV returned to Trianon, the marble château he had neglected during the early years of his reign, and which was suffering from a serious lack of maintenance. (Note: Benoît, p. 134) In 1747, the architect Ange-Jacques Gabriel, accompanied by the director of buildings Charles Lenormant de Tournehem, drew up a first sketch to restore the château's intimacy. The Marquise de Pompadour, who had been the King's lover for two years, was quick to support the project, with the aim of distracting Louis XV from his melancholy. As early as 1749, a menagerie, consisting simply of a farmyard and a stable, was built on the north-eastern plots of Mansart's château, and, in the center of a new french formal garden, a first pavilion was erected for games, snacks and concerts: the French Pavilion. (Note: Heitzmann, p. 58)

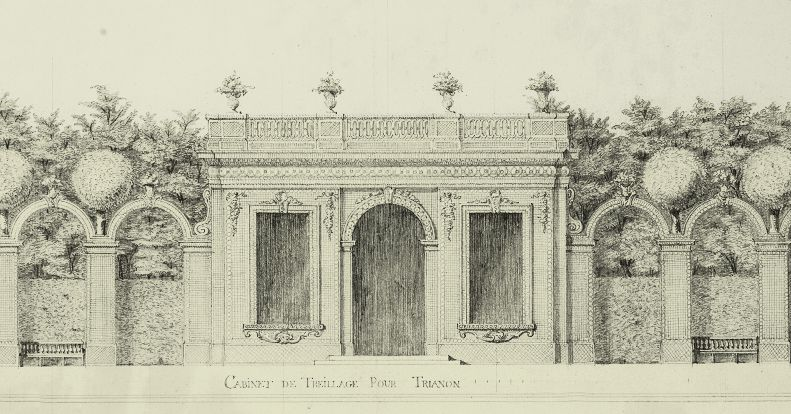
Ange-Jacques Gabriel's design for a "trellis cabinet for Trianon", 1751.

As Claude Richard's new fruit and vegetable garden took shape to the north and east of the estate, Louis XV had a "dining room" built near the first pavilion. (Note: Benoît, p. 136) Quickly dubbed the "Fresh Pavilion" due to its northerly orientation, it was intended for the consumption of produce from the menagerie's vegetable gardens and dairy. Following various projects drawn up by architect Gabriel, Tournehem signed the building order on September 17, 1751. The Thévenin brothers completed the round-arched foundations in 1751 to protect the building from damp, and the Satory gritstone walls were erected the following year. (Note: Heitzmann, p. 60) The terraced roof was entirely covered in lead. (Note: Heitzmann, p. 72) In July, the windows of the Manufacture Royale des Glaces were installed, with over one hundred and fifty panes of glass. The pavilion's purpose was to open wide onto the gardens, of which it was an extension, through the large central door and the two side French windows, as well as through the two cross windows at the front. (Note: Heitzmann, p. 64) The simple architectural design featured a recessed archway at the entrance, reminiscent of the French Pavilion or the nearby aviary. Its originality derived from the trelliswork, executed by Langelin, evocative of gardens and nature.

In 1753, the fresh Pavillon represented the completion of the first part of Gabriel's work at the Petit Trianon, before the estate was handed over to the gardeners and botanists, and the second phase began eight years later with the construction of the Petit Château.

== The jardin particulier du Roy ==
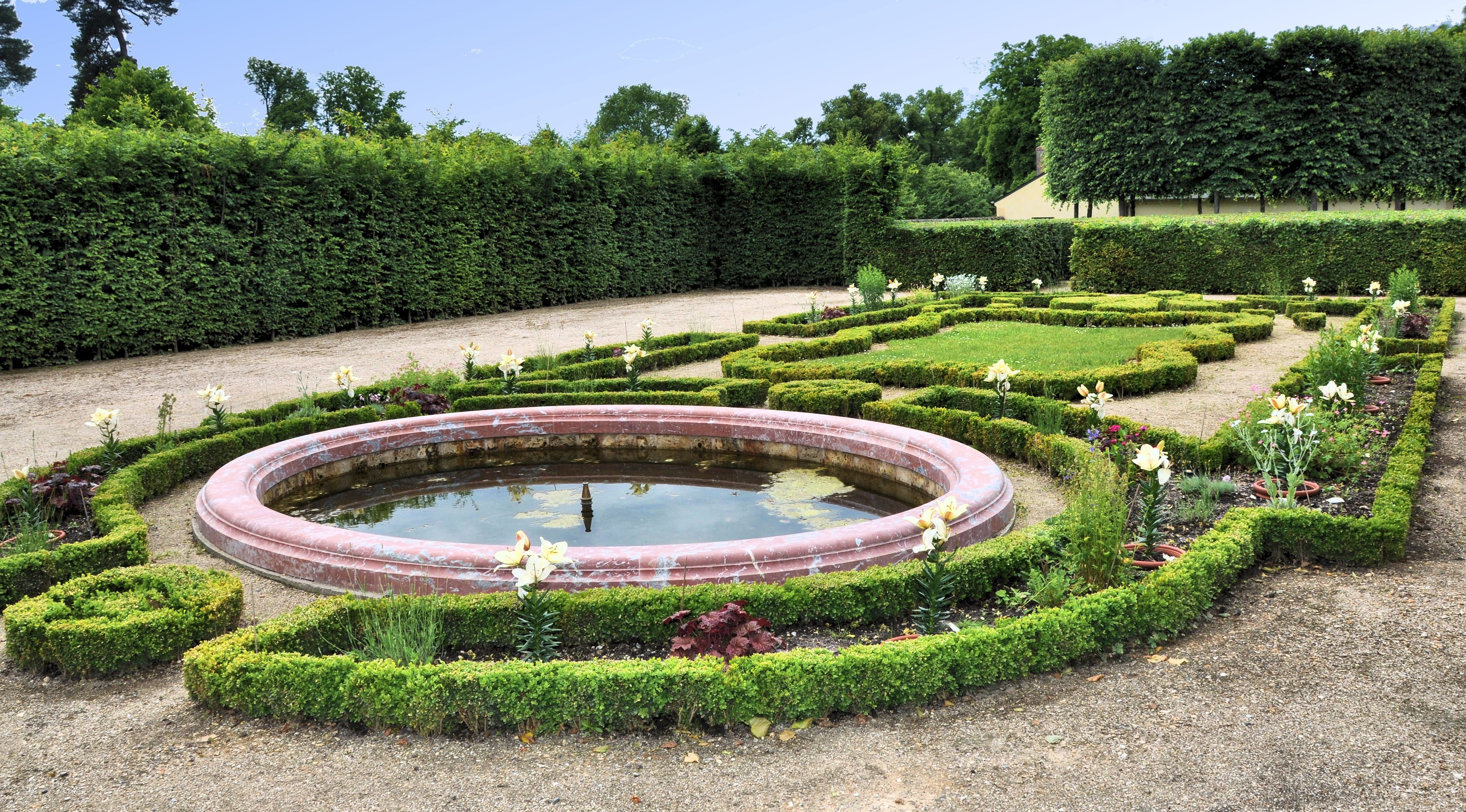
Garden of the Fresh Pavilion.

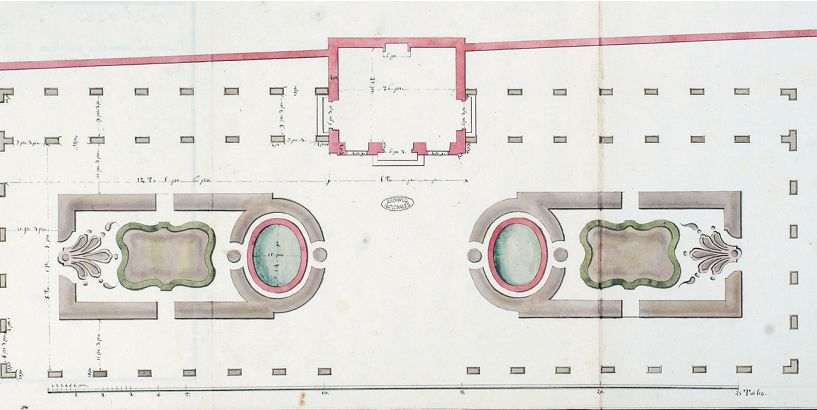
Ange-Jacques Gabriel's design for the "Nouveau jardin du Trianon", 1751.

The Fresh Pavilion is located at the end of the southern branch of the Latin cross forming the French Garden. Opposite is the menagerie. The aisle opposite the Fresh Salon leading to the French Pavilion is the same width, in order to preserve the view between the two buildings. (Note: Heitzmann, p. 66) At the front of the salon is a rectangular garden, measuring fifty by twenty meters, a veritable "cabinet de verdure" entirely surrounded by trellised arches. These arcades, aligned on the north façade of the building, are made up of a series of iron frames measuring almost 3.50 m high by 2.35 m wide, executed by the locksmith Gamain le Jeune (Note: This family of locksmiths probably included Louis Gamain, who made the banister for the Petit Trianon in 1766, or perhaps his younger brother François, father of another François Gamain, all of whom worked in the same trade.) in July 1752. These frames support latticework pilasters encircling the trunks of linden trees with ball-shaped foliage. The entrance is framed by two imposing pillars supporting large baskets. The walkways are covered with river sand.

On the Fresh Salon side, a second row of arches forms two aisles, each accessed through a side French window. At the ends of the two aisles, trellis niches were installed, beneath which, in 1756, two statues by David Bourderelle. (Note: They were then attributed to François Anguier, his uncle, to whom he was heir. Heitzmann, p. 69, Alain Erlande-Brandenburg. École nationale des chartes (ed.). Études d'histoire de l'art offertes à Jacques Thirion. p. 195. ISBN 978-2900791448.) from the Salle des Antiques in the Versailles park were placed: La Maladie and La Santé, originally intended to decorate a tomb. The clasp of each of the fifty-four arches is surmounted by a basket-shaped vase, reminiscent of the pavilion's four acroterial ornaments. (Note: Heitzmann, p. 67)

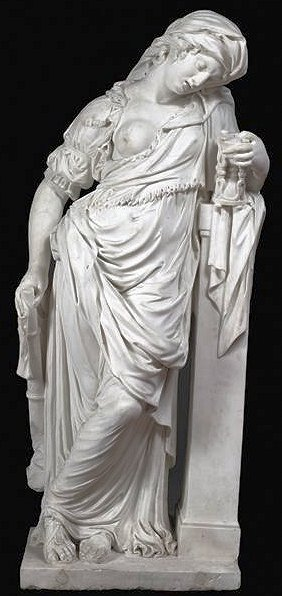
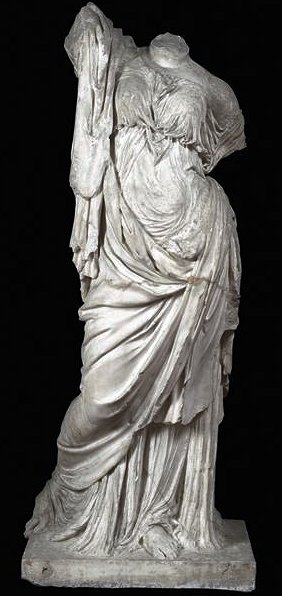
David Bourderelle's statues, La Maladie and La Santé, were once placed at the ends of the trellised walkways.

All the arcades, pilasters and façades were covered with trelliswork by Langelin - who was responsible for many of the works on the Versailles estate - and painted green, as were the ornamental baskets. In September 1753, after several unsuccessful attempts, Louis XV commissioned gardener Jean-Baptiste-Louis Belleville to add forty orange trees inside the arcades. (Note: Heitzmann, p. 68) A toilet was also concealed by trelliswork near the guardhouse officers' building. (Note: Heitzmann, p. 70)

Two small oval basins, designed to accommodate goldfish at the King's request, formed the end of symmetrical parterres planted with juliennes, wallflowers and Spanish carnations, and on the opposite side of each basin was a boxwood palmette. They were solidly built due to their original shape, requiring exceptional reinforcement to avoid breaking points, with the clay corbel and counter-wall exceeding one meter in thickness. The bottom was covered with flint and colored sandstone paving stones in geometric patterns, (Note: Heitzmann, pp. 78–79) and the coping was made of Languedoc marble by Louis-François Trouard.

== Interior of the pavilion ==
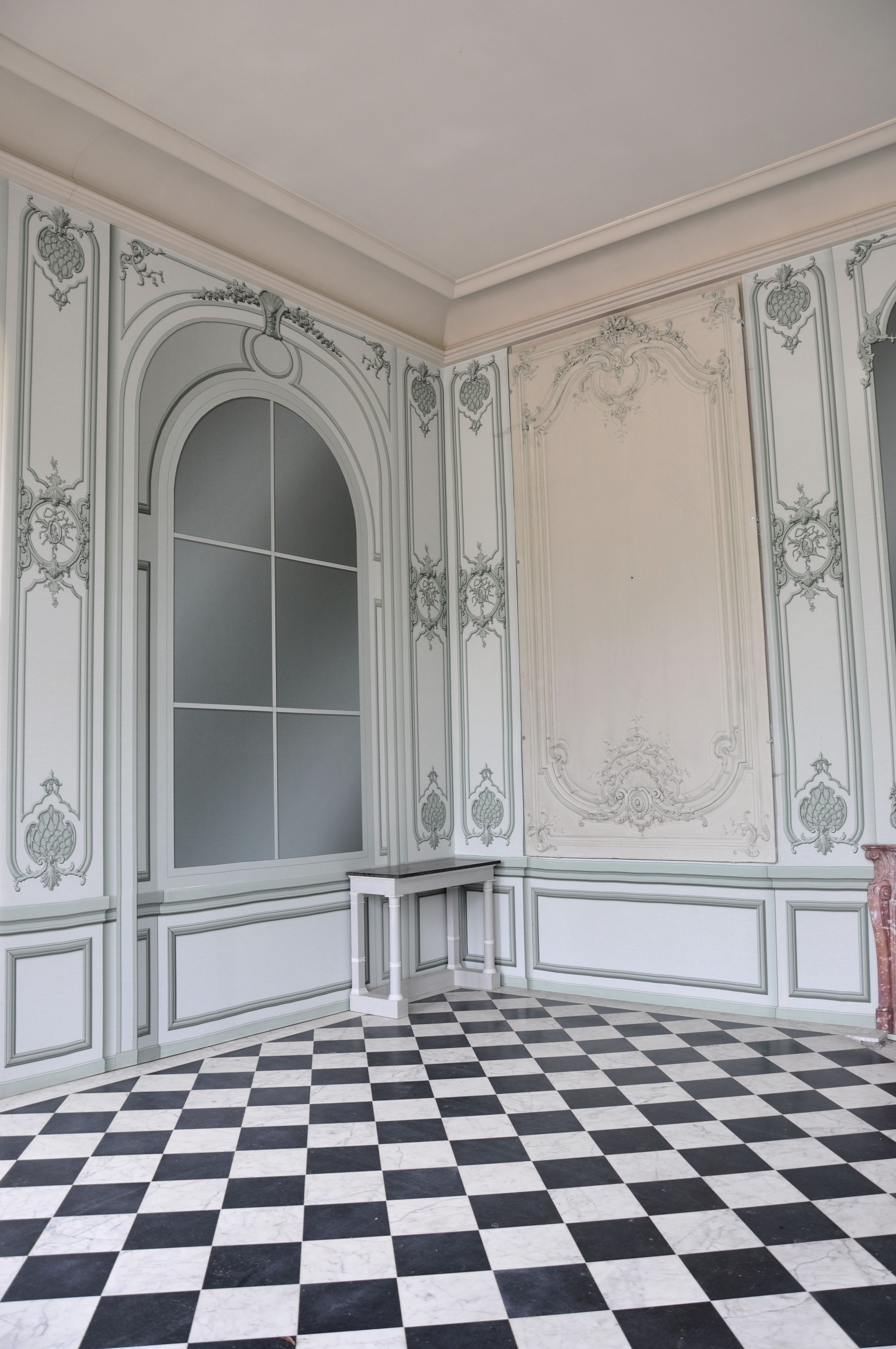
Inside the Fresh Pavilion: the right-hand panel is original, the rest of the wall decoration is a drawing.

The interior was richly decorated, despite the pavilion's small size (barely 60 m2); the walls were covered with oak panelling by carpenter Jean-Antoine Guesnon, (Note: He also designed the main door of the Chapelle royale, and, later, the underpinnings of the Château du Petit Trianon. He died in 1784. ("Une chapelle pour le Roi" (PDF). chateauversailles (in French). p. 13.)) sculpted by Jacques Verbeckt and painted green and white by the King's painter, Médard Brancourt. (Note: Two of these panels were preserved and displayed in the French Pavilion, having been replaced by Louis-Philippe for the antichambre of the Petit Trianon. They were restored in 2008.) The same shades of green were used on the frames of the three glass panels; a fireplace, in Languedoc marble just like the coping of the basins, completed the back wall on May 30, 1752, more for show than for practicality, as this was a summer salon. (Note: It was probably reused and reserved in a Parisian shop. This mantel has disappeared.) In the center of the white ceiling stood a lantern similar to the one in the French Pavilion, decorated with garlands of porcelain flowers, and on the walls a pair of three-pointed arms. The five doors and transoms were adorned with double curtains in white gros de Tours. (Note: Silk fabric with fine transverse ribbing.) The floor was made of black and white marble.

The furniture, which has now disappeared, consisted in 1776 of two white sofas with gilded moldings and covered in green and white Persian cloth, as well as two armchairs and eighteen chairs of the same assortment. A vast carpet was commissioned in 1754 from the Savonnerie manufactory and delivered in 1760; Chevillon's design featured a cameo of green to match the panelling and façades on a white background, with the King's cipher in the center and fleurs-de-lis in the four corners. After being excluded from revolutionary sales, it was sent to the Luxembourg palace in Year V, before being transferred to Cambacérès' Hôtel d'Elbeuf in 1807, where it disappeared from inventories.

== Decline of the garden and the pavilion ==
The construction of the Petit Trianon, starting in 1762, altered the organization of the formal garden between the menagerie and the fresh Salon. The small garden attached to the latter continued to be maintained, the trellises regularly restored, but the parterres were simplified as minds focused on the creation of Marie-Antoinette's English Garden. The Revolution accelerated the decline: the theft of the lead roof of the Fresh Pavilion on January 31, 1793 led to the collapse of part of the ceiling. The mirrors were quickly removed and stored in the billiard room; three years later, the panelling, fireplace and marble floor were removed and moved to the kitchens of the Petit Trianon. Bourderelle's two sculptures were sent to the Château de Saint-Cloud. (Note: After a visit to the Musée de l'école française. "1797 Creation of the special museum of the École française".)

In 1810, the fresh Pavillon was demolished, as the cost of the restoration work proposed by Napoleon I's architect, Guillaume Trepsat, was too high. The foundations were nevertheless preserved, and some of the stones were recycled when the chinese ring game (Le jeu de bague chinois) was rebuilt for Empress Marie-Louise. (Note: Heitzmann, p. 73) The basins were covered over and the flowerbeds disappeared completely.

== Restitution ==
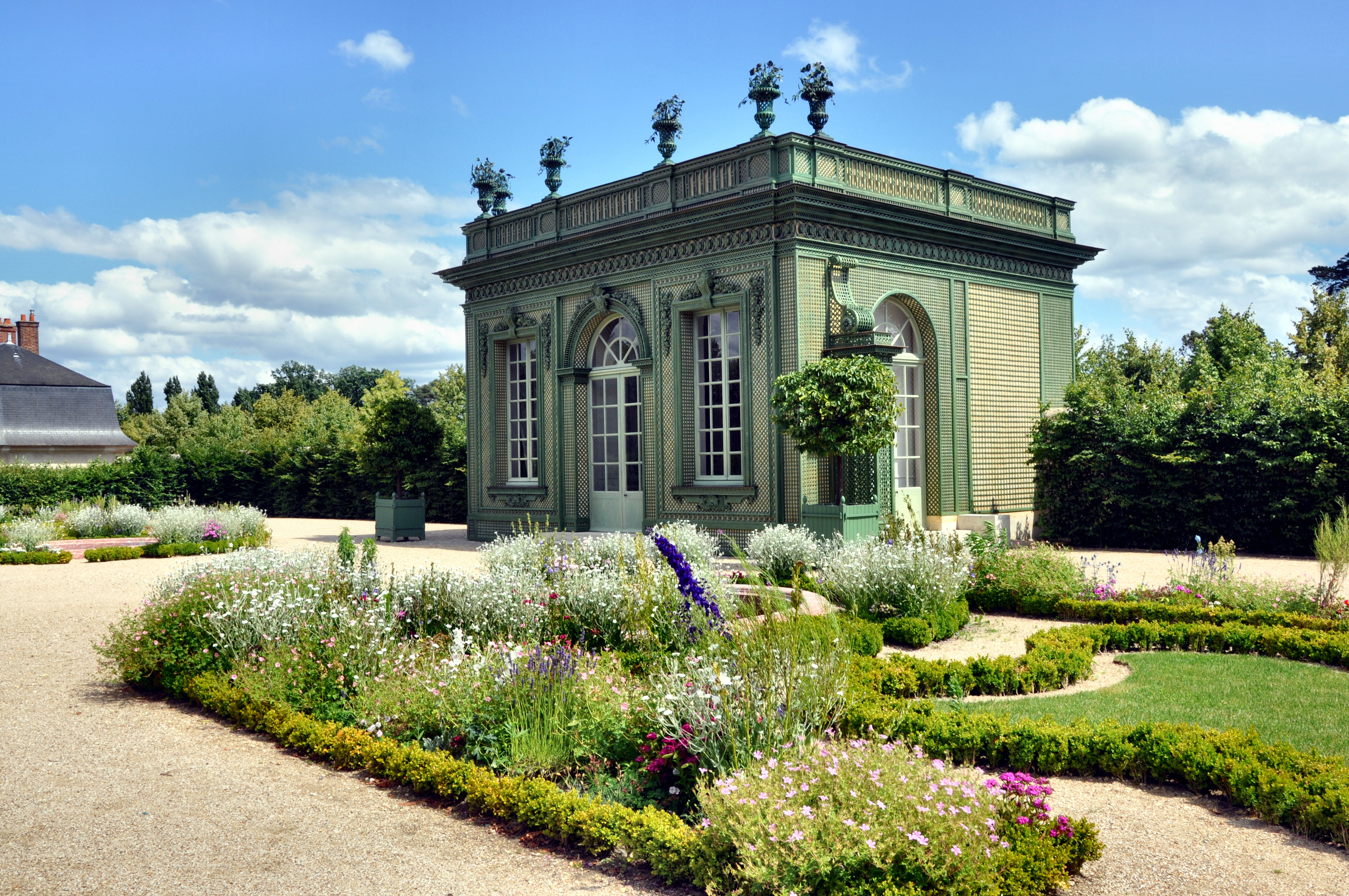
The Fresh Pavilion in the middle of the gardens.

In 1980, it was decided to rebuild the pavilion as a reception area. Reinforced concrete foundations were laid on top of the original ones, but when the building was completed in 1984, it was simply decorated with trellis panels, and ultimately not used as a reception area. Several archaeological campaigns were carried out between 2006 and 2009 by Annick Heitzmann, (Note: Annick Heitzmann is a researcher specializing in archaeology at the Palace of Versailles Research Centre.) under the supervision of Pierre-André Lablaude, chief architect of historic monuments, in order to validate historical knowledge and bring the restoration project as close as possible to historical reality, for the architecture and interior decoration, as well as for the fountains and gardens. This research was complemented by a study of Langelin's contractor's brief, whose sketches and drawings enabled a meticulous reconstruction of the decor.

The budget for the restoration of the Fresh Pavilion and its garden totaled two million euros. Thanks to the sponsorship of The American Friends of Versailles, the first phase in 2010 restored the façade trellises with their six crowning vases, as well as the pilasters framing the garden entrance. The second phase involved extending the trellis gallery, reconstructing all the arcades and completing the interior decoration of the building, following the installation of the two preserved panelled panels.

Although it was not rebuilt until 1984, as a dependency of the Château de Versailles, it was classified as a historic monument by the list of 1862 and the decree of October 31, 1906, and has been a UNESCO World Heritage Site since 1979. Today, it is open to the public as part of the Public Establishment of the Palace, Museum and National Estate of Versailles, within the Domain of Marie-Antoinette.

== See also ==
- Petit Trianon
- Grand Trianon
