= Béatrix Saule =

French art historian and conservator (born 1950)

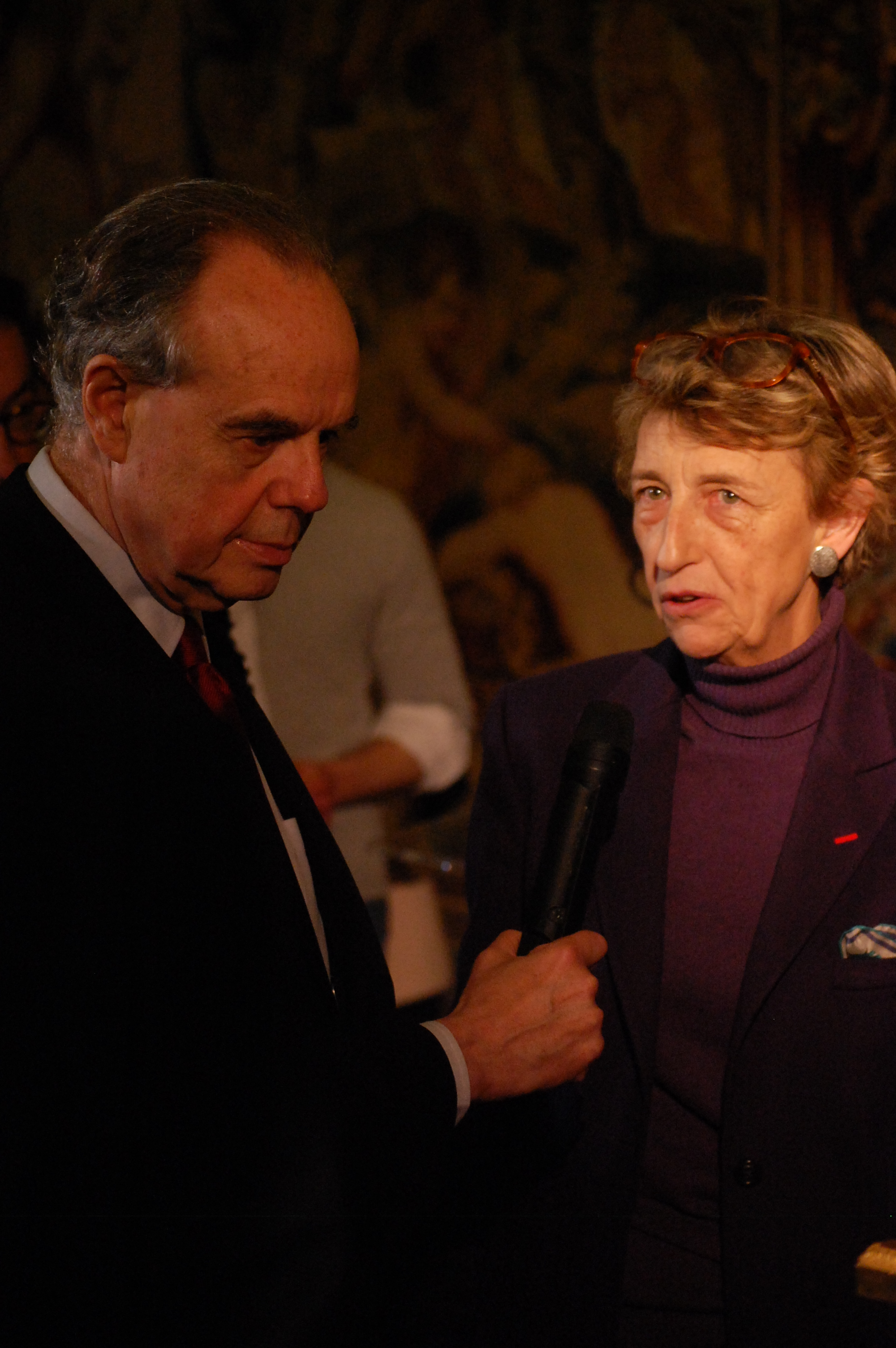
- Saule presenting the Bureau de Marie-Antoinette to Frédéric Mitterrand, French Minister of Culture, in 2011
- Born: Béatrix Yolande Houdart de La Motte; 10 November 1950 (age 75); Charenton-le-Pont, France
- Education: Institut d'Administration des Entreprises; École du Louvre; Paris 1 Panthéon-Sorbonne University
- Awards: Knight of the Order of the Polar Star; Knight of the Order of the Dannebrog; Knight of the Ordre national du Mérite; Resident at the Villa Medici (1975–76); Knight of the Legion of Honour; Officer of the Ordre des Arts et des Lettres

Béatrix Yolande Saule (French pronunciation: [beatʁiks sol]; née Houdart de La Motte, 10 November 1950) is a French art historian. She spent much of her career at the Palace of Versailles, for which she began working in 1976, and served as director of the Public Establishment of the Palace, Museum and National Estate of Versailles from 2010 to 2016.

== Early life ==
Béatrix Saule was born on 10 November 1950 in Charenton-le-Pont, near Paris.

== Education ==
Saule was admitted to the French Academy in Rome in 1975, where she was a resident until 1976.

== Career at Versailles ==
Saule began her career at the Palace of Versailles in 1976, and by 1988 was its chief curator. When the Public Establishment of the Palace, Museum and National Estate of Versailles was established in 1995, Saule was made the director of its outreach program.

=== Director-General of the Public Establishment ===
Saule was appointed the director of the Palace of Versailles Research Centre in 2008. She was a vocal opponent of the display of contemporary art within the palace of Versailles, but supported its display in the gardens.

On 4 December 2010, Frédéric Mitterrand, then the French Minister of Culture, appointed Saule as director-general of the Public Establishment of the Palace, Museum and National Estate of Versailles, established in 1995.

As her final act as director-general, Saule helped organize an exhibition of 130 items from Versailles and select Australian collections at the National Gallery of Australia in late 2016 and early 2017. She was succeeded by curator Laurent Salomé.

== Post-Versailles ==
Saule was a curator of an exhibit of over 150 items from Notre Dame de Paris in 2020, many of which were recovered from the cathedral immediately after the 2015 fire.
