= Jean Girel =

French ceramic artist (born 1947)

- Born: January 15, 1947 (age 79); Savoie, France
- Known for: Tenmoku

Jean Girel in his workshop

Jean Girel (born in 1947) is a French ceramic artist.

== Biography ==
Girel was born in Savoie, France, in 1947. His family owned an agricultural school, which allowed him to become acquainted with nature and clay at a young age. He became interested in ceramics around the age of 10. By the age of 14, he had been apprenticed to a local village potter. Though ceramics would become his lifelong passion, Girel's parents wanted him to finish his schooling before making any career decisions, which lead to his reading Fine Arts at Mâcon and receiving a diploma in fine arts in Paris.

He rediscovered ceramics in a chance encounter with a Song dynasty bowl at the Musée Guimet, after which he abandoned his career as a teacher of painting to dedicate himself to the study and recreation of green-glazed and tenmoku Song ware.

Today, his works are exhibited throughout the world in galleries and museums like the National Museum of China, the British Museum, the Beijing Palace Museum, and others.

His studio is near Cluny, in Burgundy.

== Honors ==
In 2000, he was named Maître d'art by the French Ministry of Culture, and then made a Chevalier des Arts et des Lettres in 2008.
