= Catherine Pégard =

French journalist and politician (born 1954)

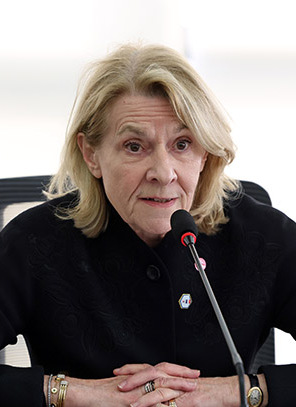
- Pégard in 2026

Minister of Culture
- Incumbent
- Assumed office 26 February 2026
- Prime Minister: Sébastien Lecornu
- Preceded by: Rachida Dati

President of the Public Establishment of the Palace, Museum and National Estate of Versailles
- In office 2 October 2011 – 3 March 2024
- Preceded by: Jean-Jacques Aillagon
- Succeeded by: Christophe Leribault

Personal details
- Born: Catherine Jacqueline Alice Pégard; 5 August 1954 (age 72) Le Havre, France
- Education: Sciences Po
- Occupation: Journalist

Catherine Jacqueline Alice Pégard (French pronunciation: [katʁin peɡaʁ]; born 5 August 1954) is a French politician and former journalist. She was appointed Minister of Culture by President Emmanuel Macron on 26 February 2026.

Pégard spent most of her career at Le Point where she was editor-in-chief from 1995 to 2007. In May 2007, she was appointed adviser to President Nicolas Sarkozy, and was in charge of the "political centre" at the Élysée from March 2008. From 2011 to 2024, she headed the Public Establishment of the Palace, Museum and National Estate of Versailles which administers the Palace of Versailles.

== Early career ==
Pégard was born in Le Havre and after high school had her first experience with journalism under the leadership of Roger Campion, the editor of the local Le Havre Libre.

After studying history and political science, Pégard began her journalistic career in 1977. From 1978 to 1982, she wrote about politics in Le Quotidien de Paris.

== At Le Point ==
Pégard joined Le Point as a political journalist in 1982. She covered in particular the area of parliamentary news. When Denis Jeambar became editor-in-chief in 1988, as well as editor-in-chief of the political and cultural departments, Pégard became his assistant. After Jeambar left and became general director of Europe 1 in 1995, Pégard took over as editor-in-chief of Le Point.

Pégard published a weekly "Political notebook" in Le Point fed from the backstage of politics. At the same time, she discussed political news on Radio Classique with Jean-Marc Lech. From October 2004, she also co-hosted the show Les Femmes et les Patrons d'abord ("The Women and the Patrons First") on Paris Première alongside Alexandra Golovanoff.

== At the Élysée ==
Pégard left Le Point in 2007, when she was appointed adviser to President Nicolas Sarkozy. The appointment of a journalist-editor from a major newspaper such as Le Point as advisor to the President sparked controversy. Asked about the issue of relations between the press and politics in France, the reporter John Vinocur from the International Herald Tribune responded in an interview by Renaud Revel in L'Express (31 May 2007): "I think that you exaggerate the complicity of the links that in reality exist in all the democracies of the world. Journalists have become the scapegoats of a society at odds with its elites."

Independent advisor to the President from May 2007, Pégard in mid-March 2008 became the head of the new "political center" created by the Presidency, integrating the closest collaborators of the President. She was assisted by Jerome Peyrat, the councilor in charge of the President's relations with Parliament. Catherine Pégard subsequently was responsible for cultural matters at the Elysee.

== At Versailles ==
Pégard was appointed to the presidency of the Public Establishment of the Palace, Museum and National Estate of Versailles by the Government of France on 31 August 2011, and took office on 2 October, succeeding Jean-Jacques Aillagon, who went on pension.

The appointment of Pégard was denounced publicly by some heritage professionals, regretting that she lacked experience in the management of cultural administration.

In 2013, Pégard endorsed an exhibition with photographs by Ahae, pseudonym of the South Korean businessman Yoo Byung-eun, praising his artistic qualities. Pégard disclosed that the exhibition was on a sponsorship basis, saying "The artist himself wanted to rent the Orangerie. But we never communicate the numbers." Newspapers Le Monde and The Times wrote that Ahae donated €5 million (~US$6.8 million) to Versailles. Ahae was the sole patron of the Bosquet du Théâtre d'Eau or Water Theatre Grove (fr) which was refurbished in 2013–2014 on the grounds of the Palace of Versailles, donating €1.4 million (~US$1.9 million). Following the sinking of the ferry Sewol in April 2014, Pégard's decision to rent out the Orangerie Hall of the Palace of Versailles in 2013 to Yoo Byung-eun prompted French media and Korean expatriates in France to raise their concerns over French cultural institutions accepting self-financed exhibitions in return for donations.

== Politics ==
After having left the Palace of Versailles in 2024, Pégard returned to the Élysée in 2025, this time as the cultural adviser to President Emmanuel Macron. She was appointed Minister of Culture by Macron on 26 February 2026, succeeding Rachida Dati, who had resigned in order to run in the 2026 Paris municipal election.

== Honours ==
- Officer of the Legion of Honour (2022)
- Officer of the Ordre national du Mérite (2016)
- Commander of the Ordre des Arts et des Lettres (2015)
