= Jean-Michel Fourgous =

French politician

Mayor of Élancourt
- Incumbent
- Assumed office 4 April 1996
- Preceded by: Alain Danet

Member of the National Assembly for Yvelines's 11th constituency
- In office 19 June 2002 – 19 June 2012
- Preceded by: Guy Malandain
- Succeeded by: Benoît Hamon
- In office 2 April 1993 – 11 June 1997
- Preceded by: Guy Malandain
- Succeeded by: Catherine Tasca

Personal details
- Born: 30 September 1953 (age 72) Montreuil, France
- Party: The Republicans

Jean-Michel Fourgous (born 30 September 1953 in Montreuil, Seine-Saint-Denis) is a member of the National Assembly of France. He represents a part of the Yvelines department, and is a member of the Union for a Popular Movement.
