= Yvelines's 11th constituency =

Constituency of the National Assembly of France

11th constituency of Yvelines
- inline Constituency of the National Assembly of France

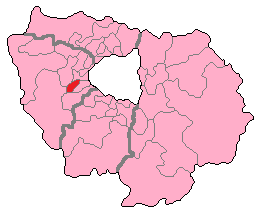
- Yvelines' 11th Constituency shown within Île-de-France
- Deputy: Laurent Mazaury; UDI
- Department: Yvelines
- Cantons: Saint-Cyr-l’École · Trappes · d’Élancourt · La Verrière
- Registered voters: 65,697

The 11th constituency of Yvelines is a French legislative constituency in the Yvelines département.

== Description ==
The 11th constituency of Yvelines lies in the middle of the department and forms part of the western suburbs of Paris.

The seat is one of the more left leaning in Yvelines and has elected PS deputies at the 1988, 1997 and 2012 elections.

At the 2012 it elected leading left winger Benoît Hamon who was appointed almost instantly to the government of Jean-Marc Ayrault.

Philippe Benassaya was elected at a 2020 by-election, following the appointment of Nadia Hai as Secretary of State to Minister of Territorial Development Jacqueline Gourault.

== Historic representation ==
Election	Member	Party
1986	Proportional representation – no election by constituency	
1988	Guy Malandain	PS
1993	Jean-Michel Fourgous	RPR
1997	Catherine Tasca	PS
2000	Guy Malandain	PS
2002	Jean-Michel Fourgous	UMP
2007	Jean-Michel Fourgous	UMP
2012	Benoît Hamon	PS
2012	Jean-Philippe Mallé	PS
2014	Benoît Hamon	PS
2017	Nadia Hai	LREM
2020	Philippe Benassaya	LR
2022	William Martinet	LFI
2024	Laurent Mazaury	UDI

== Election results ==
=== 2024 ===
Candidate	Party	Alliance	First round			Second round		
Candidate	Party	Alliance	Votes	%	+/–	Votes	%	+/–
William Martinet	LFI	NFP	20,395	43.48	+10.52	22,035	49.84	-0.34
Laurent Mazaury	UDI	ENS	13,752	29.25	+4.16	22,175	50.16	n/a
Vincent Doucet	RN		10,243	21.79	+11.19	WITHDREW		
Sarah Nicos	DVE		1,048	2.23	N/A			
Nathalie Machuca	REC		900	1.91	-2.82			
Patrick Planque	LO		507	1.08	+0.11			
Boris Lutz	EXD		166	0.35	N/A			
Valid votes			47,011	97.68	-0.38	44,210	94.85	-2.83
Blank votes			816	1.70	+0.23	1,840	3.95	+2.25
Null votes			300	0.62	+0.15	560	1.20	+0.58
Turnout			48,127	68.14	+19.53	46,610	65.97	-2.17
Abstentions			22,503	31.86	-19.53	24,041	34.03	+2.17
Registered voters			70,630			70,651		
Source: Ministry of the Interior, Le Monde
Result						UDI GAIN		

=== 2022 ===
Legislative Election 2022: Yvelines's 11th constituency
Party	Candidate	Votes	%	±%
LFI (NUPÉS)	William Martinet	10,888	32.96	+1.65
LREM (Ensemble)	Aurélie Piacenza	8,289	25.09	+9.67
LR (UDC)	Philippe Benassaya	5,913	17.90	−18.72
RN	Sophie Chabanet	3,500	10.60	+3.47
REC	Alexandre Arnaud	1,563	4.73	N/A
DVE	Jean-Luc Tramoni	737	2.23	N/A
PA	Christophe Aubin	665	2.01	N/A
Others	N/A	1,479	4.48	
Turnout		33,034	48.61	+31.01
2nd round result
LFI (NUPÉS)	William Martinet	15,760	50.18	+7.81
LREM (Ensemble)	Aurélie Piacenza	15,644	49.82	N/A
Turnout		31,404	48.22	+6.53
LFI gain from LR				

=== 2020 by-election ===
2020 by-election: Yvelines's 11th constituency
Party	Candidate	Votes	%	±%
LR	Philippe Benassaya	3,985	36.62	+13.53
G.s	Sandrine Grandgambe	2,702	24.83	N/A
LREM	Pierre Luce	1,678	15.42	−17.56
RN	Laurent Morin	776	7.13	+0.10
PCF	Valérie Froberger	705	6.48	+4.72
DLF	Olivier Gallant	388	3.57	+2.25
DVE	Jérémy Bizet	271	2.49	N/A
Others	N/A	376		
Turnout		11,101	16.60	−32.53
2nd round result
LR	Philippe Benassaya	5,692	57.63	+10.59
G.s	Sandrine Grandgambe	4,184	42.37	N/A
Turnout		10,244	15.31	−26.38
LR gain from LREM				

=== 2017 ===
==== First round ====
Legislative Election 2017: Yvelines' 11th Constituency 1st round
Party	Candidate	Votes	%	±%
LREM	Nadia Hai	10,858	32.98	N/A
LR	Jean-Michel Fourgous	7,601	23.09	−11.17
PS	Benoît Hamon	7,436	22.59	−22.71
LFI	Mathurin Levis	2,847	8.65	N/A
FN	Mathilde Androuet	2,315	7.03	−1.36
PCF	Luc Miserey	580	1.76	−3.16
DLF	Sylvia Cantaluppi	433	1.32	N/A
Far-right	Mireille Breugnot	242	0.74	N/A
Other	Yassine Amar	205	0.62	N/A
Far-left	Christine Egasse	166	0.50	+0.12
Far-left	Vincent Fournier	97	0.29	N/A
Other	Matthieu Ruffet	76	0.23	N/A
Other	Mehdi Mnaouar	63	0.19	N/A
Turnout		32,919	49.13	−7.64

==== Second round ====
Legislative Election 2017: Yvelines' 11th Constituency 2nd round
Party	Candidate	Votes	%	±%
LREM	Nadia Hai	13,684	52.96	N/A
LR	Jean-Michel Fourgous	12,154	47.04	+2.42
Turnout		28,353	41.69	−14.36
LREM gain from PS		Swing		

=== 2012 ===
==== First round ====
Legislative Election 2012: Yvelines' 11th Constituency 2nd round
Party	Candidate	Votes	%	±%
PS	Benoît Hamon	16,716	45.30	
UMP	Jean-Michel Fourgous	12,641	34.26	
FN	Jacques Dairou	3,095	8.39	
FG	Luc Miserey	1,814	4.92	
MoDem	Evelyne Duquennoy	1,121	3.04	
DVD	Marie de Montbel	385	1.04	
EELV	Jérémy Bizet	329	0.89	
Ecologist	Thierry Barry	280	0.76	
DVD	Sylvia Cantaluppi	250	0.68	
Far-left	Christine Egasse	140	0.38	
Far-left	Lydia Chenal	128	0.35	
Turnout		37,300	56.77	

==== Second round ====
Legislative Election 2012: Yvelines' 11th Constituency 2nd round
Party	Candidate	Votes	%	±%
PS	Benoît Hamon	19,925	55.38	
LR	Jean-Michel Fourgous	16,053	44.62	
Turnout		35,978	56.05	
PS hold		Swing		

=== 2007 ===
Legislative Election 2007: Yvelines's 11th constituency
Party	Candidate	Votes	%	±%
UMP	Jean-Michel Fourgous	14,588	44.01	
PS	Safia Otokore	9,028	27.24	
MoDem	Evelyne Duquennoy	3,205	9.67	
PCF	Luc Miserey	1,304	3.93	
FN	Henri Dubost	1,158	3.49	
DIV	Djamal Yalaoui	851	2.57	
Far left	Didier Malinosky	721	2.18	
Others	N/A	2,290		
Turnout		33,600	57.92	
2nd round result
UMP	Jean-Michel Fourgous	15,868	51.75	
PS	Safia Otokore	14,796	48.25	
Turnout		31,617	54.50	
UMP hold				

=== 2002 ===
Legislative Election 2002: Yvelines's 11th constituency
Party	Candidate	Votes	%	±%
UMP	Jean-Michel Fourgous	12,441	38.15	
PS	Catherine Tasca	11,093	34.02	
FN	Jean-Louis Bideau	2,845	8.72	
UDF	Pierre Le Gurinel	2,372	7.27	
PCF	Jean-Yves Gendron	1,509	4.63	
Others	N/A	2,351		
Turnout		33,075	63.08	
2nd round result
UMP	Jean-Michel Fourgous	15,619	51.66	
PS	Catherine Tasca	14,616	48.34	
Turnout		31,240	59.59	
UMP gain from PS				

=== 1997 ===
Legislative Election 1997: Yvelines's 11th constituency
Party	Candidate	Votes	%	±%
RPR	Jean-Michel Fourgous	10,337	31.47	
PS	Catherine Tasca	8,047	24.50	
PCF	Michel Espinat	5,114	15.57	
FN	Didier de Beaulieu	4,258	12.96	
GE	Brigitte Ivars	1,236	3.76	
LO	Christine Egasse	964	2.94	
DVE	Francis Dubarry	674	2.05	
Others	N/A	2,213		
Turnout		34,060	65.25	
2nd round result
PS	Catherine Tasca	17,432	50.82	
RPR	Jean-Michel Fourgous	16,869	49.18	
Turnout		36,154	69.28	
PS gain from RPR				

== Sources ==
Official results of French elections from 2002: "Résultats électoraux officiels en France" (in French).
