= Palace of Versailles Research Centre =

French research centre in a château

Coordinates: 48.816604°N 2.107169°E

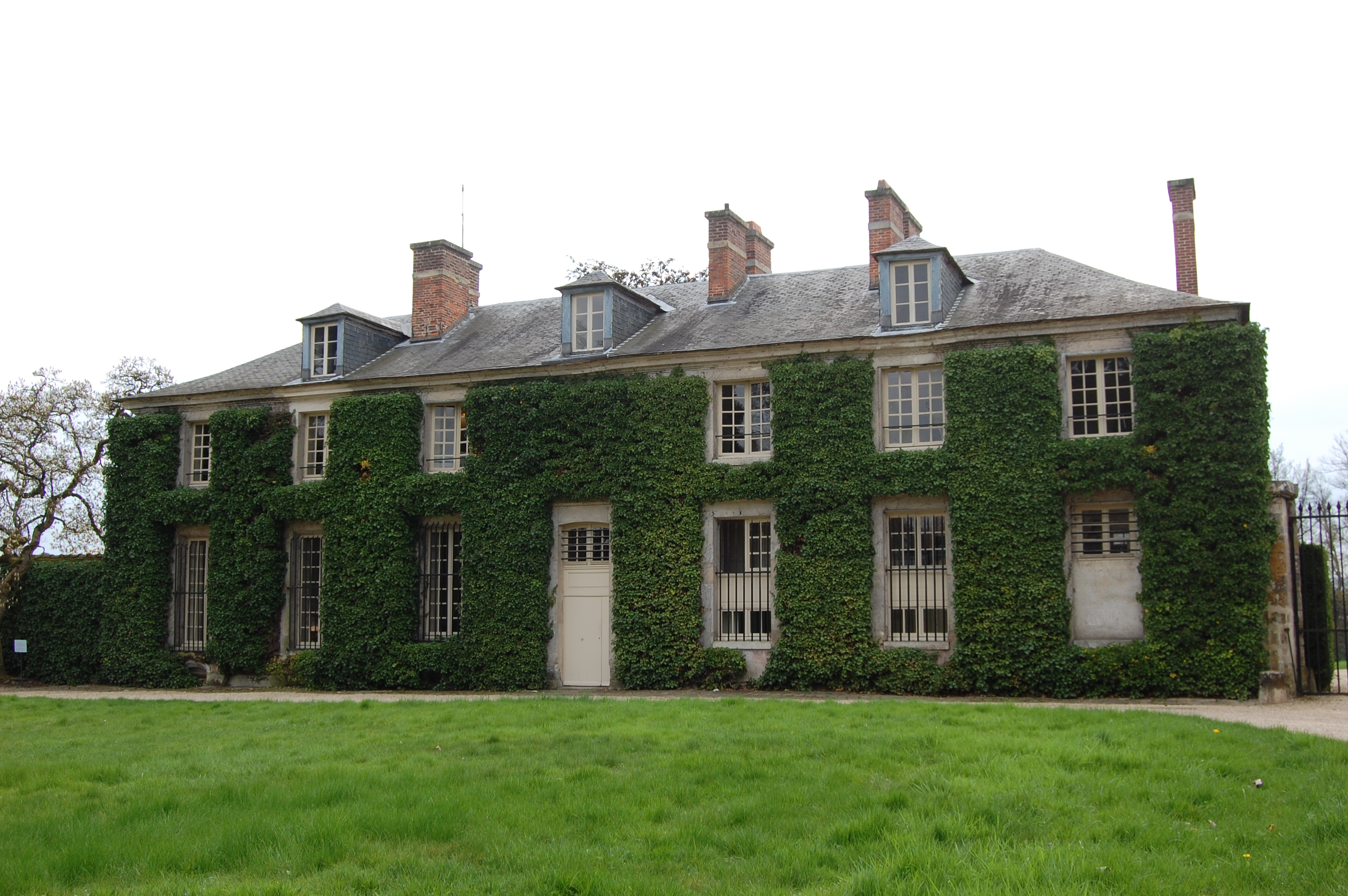
Jussieu Pavilion - home of the Palace of Versailles Research Centre

The Palace of Versailles Research Centre (in French: Centre de recherche du château de Versailles - CRCV) is the first research centre established in a French palace. It originated as part of a French government project called "Digital Great Versailles" (in French, "Grand Versailles Numérique") to improve public access to the Palace of Versailles. It is located in the Jussieu pavilion, near the Grand Trianon and the Petit Trianon, on the grounds of the Palace of Versailles, which is in the Île-de-France region of France.

The Centre serves as a resource to scholars and curators researching European court culture of the seventeenth and eighteenth centuries. For example, such research would seek to explore the sites and expressions of power, such as those represented at Versailles and in other European courts of the same era, and join researchers interested in this era. In addition to facilitating research, it also organises symposia and training activities such as seminars and summer schools. The websites of the Research Centre and of Grand Versailles Numérique are among those recommended by France's Ministry of Culture and Communication as "sites préférés."

== Jussieu Pavilion ==
The building now used by the Research Centre was once occupied by Bernard de Jussieu, a member of the family of famous botanists and historians of the natural world, after whom the Paris metro station Jussieu was named. Many of the Jussieu family were associated with France's main botanical garden, the Jardin des Plantes in Paris.

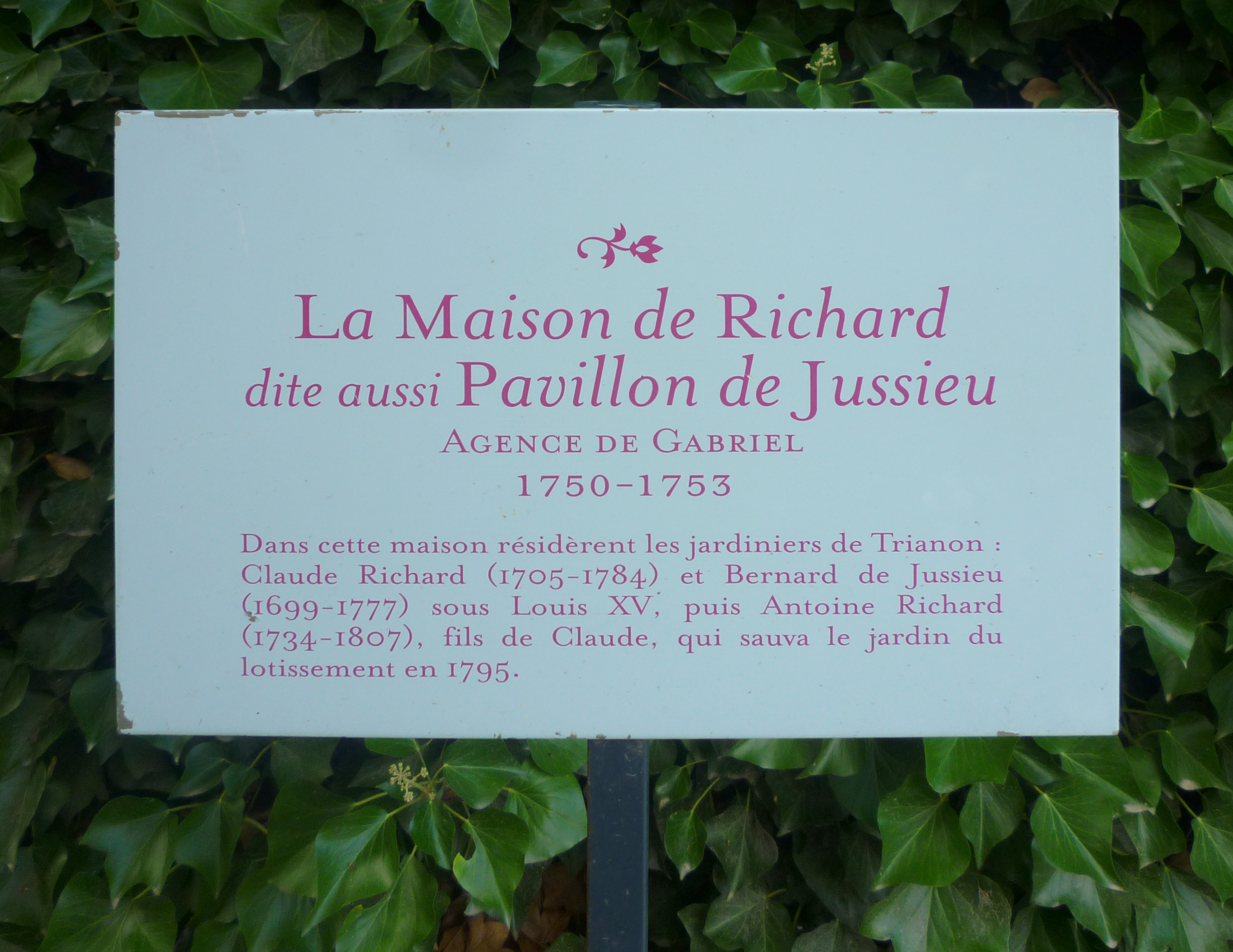
Sign marking the Jussieu Pavilion outside the Palace of Versailles Research Centre

== Members ==
Initially under the direction of the Public Establishment of Versailles, the Research Centre became a Public Interest Group on 27 October 2006, with nine founding members:

- the Ministry of Culture and Communication represented by the Directorate of Museums of France;
- the Public Establishment of the Museum and National Domain of Versailles;
- the General Council of Yvelines;
- the town of Versailles;
- School for Advanced Studies in the Social Sciences;
- Paris-Sorbonne University;
- Versailles Saint-Quentin-en-Yvelines University;
- the National Museum of Natural History;
- the National Audiovisual Institute.

This very flexible arrangement allows for the sharing of human, intellectual, material, financial, public and private resources that are necessary for the development of scientific research.

== Areas of research ==
The Centre considers Court civilisation in all its aspects:

- methods of exercising power;
- structure and functioning of institutions;
- practices and attitudes in the courts of Europe;
- movement of people and ideas;
- development of arts and sciences;
- architecture and urban planning (design of the palaces);
- decor and furnishings;
- collections;
- gardens (plans, botany, hydraulics);
- meanings of ceremonies, festivities and entertainments.

The study of these themes is allowed a flexible time frame because they often require tracing origins that strictly speaking, predate the modern period, as well as exploring more recent times. While focusing on Europe and its royal and princely courts, the geographical scope encourages comparative studies, expanding when necessary to other parts of the world. Faced with the dispersion of works and the paucity of comparative studies, the Palace of Versailles Research Centre is both a meeting place and an incentive for further research.

== Mission of the Centre ==
The Versailles Research Centre aspires to be multidisciplinary and international. It gives unity to the various works that it leads or initiates, supports new research and assures its dissemination. The missions of the centre are:

- Provide access to places and collection funds, to archives and documentation on the Palace site and promote access to nearby institutions (the departmental archives of Yvelines, Versailles Municipal Library, the Baroque Music Centre of Versailles, the Versailles National School of the landscape and the Academy of Equestrian Arts);
- Make information resources available to researchers;
- Encourage, support and guide research programs;
- Participate in learning and training by organising meetings, seminars or study visits;
- Welcome young researchers as well as experienced ones, both French and foreign;
- Ensure the widest dissemination of research through production (editing, multimedia, databases) or by the organisation and / or participation in scientific events and / or cultural activities (seminars, exhibitions);
- Promote and participate innovative or experimental projects, particularly in new technologies;
- Develop cooperative activities at European level and internationally, including with members of the Network of European royal residences.

The Research Centre publishes the Bulletin du Centre de recherche du château de Versailles.
