= Marie Lebec =

French politician (born 1990)

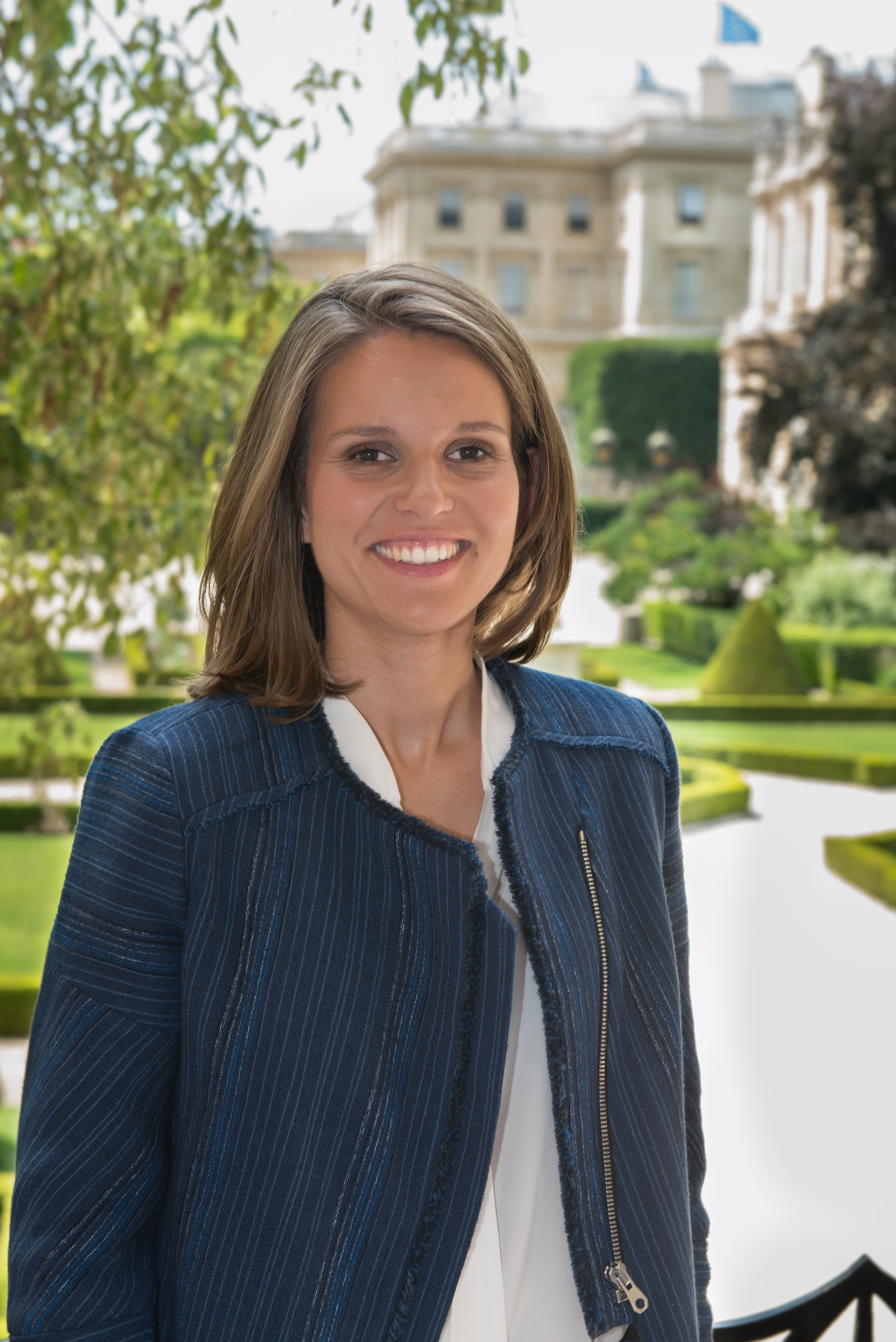
- Lebec in 2017

Member of the National Assembly for Yvelines's 4th constituency
- Incumbent
- Assumed office 8 July 2024
- Preceded by: Denis Bernaert
- In office 21 June 2017 – 11 February 2024
- Preceded by: Pierre Lequiller
- Succeeded by: Denis Bernaert

Minister Delegate for Relations with Parliament
- In office 11 January 2024 – 21 September 2024
- Prime Minister: Gabriel Attal
- Preceded by: Franck Riester
- Succeeded by: Nathalie Delattre

Personal details
- Born: 17 December 1990 (age 35) Vernon, France
- Party: Renaissance (2016–present)
- Other political affiliations: Union for a Popular Movement (formerly)
- Education: Institut d'études politiques de Bordeaux; Cardiff University

Marie Lebec ([maʁi ləbɛk]; born 17 December 1990) is a French politician who served as Minister Delegate for Relations with Parliament in the government of Prime Minister Gabriel Attal from January to September 2024. A member of Renaissance (RE, formerly La République En Marche!), she has represented the 4th constituency of the Yvelines department in the National Assembly since 2024, previously holding the seat from 2017 until her appointment to the government earlier in 2024.

Lebec is considered a close ally of President Emmanuel Macron.

== Early life ==
Marie Lebec was born on 17 December 1990 in Vernon, in the Eure department. She grew up in Louveciennes, a Parisian suburb. She graduated from the Institut d'études politiques de Bordeaux in public affairs in 2014 and from Cardiff University in European and international affairs.

Lebec supported Nicolas Sarkozy's 2007 presidential campaign. From 2014 to 2016 she was a parliamentary staffer to Christian Franqueville, a Socialist member of the National Assembly, representing Vosges. Lebec was then a lobbyist for the consulting firm Euralia, from which she took leave to stand in the 2017 legislative election.

== Political career ==
In 2016, Lebec joined En Marche, which would be renamed La République En Marche! (LREM) the following year. At age 26, she was the youngest LREM candidate in the 2017 legislative election. She won the 4th constituency of Yvelines seat with 61.3% of the second-round vote.

In Parliament, Lebec is a member of the Committee on Economic Affairs (2017–2020, 2024–present). She was a member of the Committee on Finance (2020–2022) and Committee on Laws (2022–2024). In addition to her committee assignments, she was a delegate to the Assemblée parlementaire de la Francophonie (2017–2022, 2023–2024) and chaired the French-Ivorian (2017–2022) and French-Burundian/Rwandan (2022–2024) Parliamentary Friendship Groups.

From 2019, Lebec was part of the LREM parliamentary group's leadership around its president Gilles Le Gendre. In 2020, she assisted Le Gendre with coordinating the group's support for the government's pension reform plans. From 2020 to 2022 she was first deputy group president under Christophe Castaner.

In 2024, Lebec was appointed Minister Delegate for Relations with Parliament in the Attal government, a position she did not keep in the Barnier government, instead returning to the National Assembly. She was the youngest member of the Attal government.

== Political positions ==
In July 2019, Lebec voted in favour of the French ratification of the European Union's Comprehensive Economic and Trade Agreement (CETA) with Canada.

== See also ==
- Results of the 2024 French legislative election in Yvelines
