= Living Human Treasure =

Term created by UNESCO to describe a type of person

A Living Human Treasure is, according to UNESCO, a person who possesses to a high degree the knowledge and skills required for performing or re-creating specific elements of the intangible cultural heritage. This title or a form of it is awarded by the nation's government to a person who is regarded as a national treasure while still alive. The title is also known as Living National Treasure.

== History ==
In 1950, the government of Japan began to designate certain individuals or groups who embodied intangible national cultural values as living human treasures. This was supplementary to buildings or places of great cultural and historical value that were designated as national treasures. Living Human Treasures thus became eligible for special protection and government support. Some of the ancient protected crafts initially were pottery, music, handmade paper, dolls, and swordmaking, but have been expanded to also include song, dance, cuisine, and other categories.

Several countries have followed suit with their own official programmes of recognition for intangible cultural values and the people who embody them, including France, Philippines, Romania, South Korea and Thailand.

In 1993, the government of South Korea proposed to the UNESCO Executive Board the establishment of a codified "Living Human Treasures" program for all member states. The board adopted a decision and invited member states to establish and promote such national systems. Through its Intangible Cultural Heritage section, UNESCO introduced definitions and guidelines for supporting such living human treasure programmes.

== Definitions ==
The member states at the 32nd UNESCO General Conference in October 2003 agreed to the Convention for the Safeguarding of the Intangible Cultural Heritage. The definitions of what a Living Human Treasure constitute are:

(i) Living Human Treasures are persons who possess to a very high degree the knowledge and skills required for performing or re‐creating specific elements of the intangible cultural heritage. Each Member State should choose an appropriate title to designate the bearers of knowledge and skills, the title of "Living Human Treasures" proposed by UNESCO being indicative. Among the systems in existence, there are already a variety of titles: Master of Art (France), Bearer of Popular Craft Tradition (Czech Republic), National Living Treasure (Republic of Korea), Holder of an Important Intangible Cultural Property (Japan and Republic of Korea).

(ii) Intangible cultural heritage, or living heritage, consists of practices and expressions, as well as the knowledge, skills and values associated therewith, that communities and groups recognize as part of their cultural heritage.
This heritage is transmitted from generation to generation, for the most part orally. It is constantly recreated in response to changes in the social and cultural environment. It provides individuals, groups and communities with a sense of identity and continuity and constitutes a guarantee of sustainable development.

(iii) "Intangible cultural heritage" is manifested inter alia in the following domains, on the understanding that the expressions of intangible cultural heritage can simultaneously belong to several of these domains:

" (a) oral traditions and expressions, including language as a vehicle of the intangible cultural heritage;
(b) performing arts;
(c) social practices, rituals and festive events;
(d) knowledge and practices concerning nature and the universe;
(e) traditional craftsmanship." (Article 2.2 of the Convention for the Safeguarding of the Intangible Cultural Heritage).

(iv) Safeguarding of intangible cultural heritage means:
"measures aimed at ensuring the viability of the intangible cultural heritage, including the identification, documentation, research, preservation, protection, promotion, enhancement, transmission through formal and non‐formal education, as well as the revitalization of the various aspects of such heritage." (Article 2.3)

== List of countries which have the recognition ==
- National Living Treasure (Romania) (Tezau Uman Viu)
- National Living Treasure (Philippines)
- Bearer of Popular Craft Tradition (Czech Republic)
- Living Human Treasure (Cambodia)
- Living National Treasure (Japan)
- Living National Treasure (South Korea)
- Maître d'art (France)
- National Artist (Thailand)

=== Others ===
- National Aboriginal & Torres Strait Islander Art Award (Australia)
- National Heritage Fellowship (USA)
- Cherokee National Treasure (USA)
- Te Waka Toi awards (New Zealand)

In some countries modern artists can also receive the title of National Artist, however this is not considered an intangible cultural heritage since it does fulfill criteria i and ii.

- National Artist of the Philippines
