= Yvelines's 4th constituency =

Constituency of the National Assembly of France

4th constituency of Yvelines
- inline Constituency of the National Assembly of France

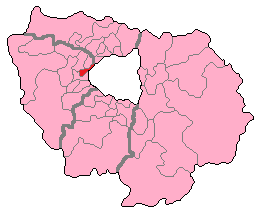
- Yvelines' 4th Constituency shown within Île-de-France
- Deputy: Marie Lebec; RE
- Department: Yvelines
- Cantons: Chatou, Houilles, Marly-le-Roi
- Registered voters: 76,864

The 4th constituency of Yvelines is a French legislative constituency in the Yvelines département.

== Description ==
The 4th constituency of Yvelines is a dense urban seat covering the Parisian suburbs around a loop in the Seine river on the eastern edge of the department.

Until 2017 the seat elected conservatives at every election since its creation with the sole exception of 1969 when it elected future Prime Minister of France Michel Rocard.

== Historic Representation ==
| Election | Member | Party |
|---|---|---|
| 1967 | Pierre Clostermann | UNR |
| 1968 | Pierre Clostermann | UNR |
| 1969 | Michel Rocard | PSU |
| 1973 | Marc Lauriol | UDR |
| 1978 | Marc Lauriol | RPR |
| 1981 | Marc Lauriol | RPR |
| 1986 | Proportional representation – no election by constituency | |
| 1988 | Pierre Lequiller | UDF |
| 1993 | Pierre Lequiller | UDF |
| 1997 | Pierre Lequiller | UDF |
| 2002 | Pierre Lequiller | UMP |
| 2007 | Pierre Lequiller | UMP |
| 2012 | Pierre Lequiller | UMP |
| 2017 | Marie Lebec | LREM |
| 2022 | Marie Lebec | RE |

== Election results ==
=== 2024 ===
| Candidate | Party | Alliance | First round | | | Second round | | |
| Candidate | Party | Alliance | Votes | % | +/– | Votes | % | +/– |
|---|---|---|---|---|---|---|---|---|
| Marie Lebec | RE | ENS | 23,932 | 41.24 | -1.10 | 28,306 | 50.67 | +9.43 |
| Céline Bourdon | LFI | NFP | 15,787 | 27.21 | +2.28 | 15,066 | 26.97 | -0.24 |
| Jean-François Mourtoux | LR-RN | UXD | 11,599 | 19.99 | +11.34 | 12,486 | 22.35 | +2.36 |
| Anne-Sophie Ho Massat | LR | | 5,383 | 9.28 | -3.49 | | | |
| Manon Bardy | REC | | 868 | 1.44 | -5.10 | | | |
| Jean-Loup Leroux | LO | | 523 | 0.87 | +0.09 | | | |
| Guillaume Carlier | DVC | | 147 | 0.24 | N/A | | | |
| Valid votes | | | 58,027 | 98.14 | -0.22 | 55,858 | 97.75 | -0.39 |
| Blank votes | | | 833 | 1.41 | +0.10 | 998 | 1.75 | +0.34 |
| Null votes | | | 269 | 0.45 | +0.12 | 286 | 0.50 | +0.05 |
| Turnout | | | 59,129 | 73.13 | +18.29 | 57,142 | 70.65 | -2.48 |
| Abstentions | | | 21,729 | 26.87 | -18.29 | 23,739 | 29.35 | +2.48 |
| Registered voters | | | 80,858 | | | 80,881 | | |
Source: Ministry of the Interior, Le Monde
| Result | | | | | | RE HOLD | | |

=== 2022 ===
Legislative Election 2022: Yvelines's 4th constituency
| Party | Candidate | Votes | % | ±% |
|---|---|---|---|---|
| LREM (Ensemble) | Marie Lebec | 18,308 | 42.34 | -5.58 |
| LFI (NUPÉS) | Céline Bourdon | 10,780 | 24.93 | +9.56 |
| LR (UDC) | Charles Consigny | 5,523 | 12.77 | −9.62 |
| RN | Sophie Lelandais | 3,739 | 8.65 | +3.32 |
| REC | Bénédicte Rativet | 2,826 | 6.54 | N/A |
| PA | Chloé Richard-Desoubeaux | 1,107 | 2.56 | N/A |
| Others | N/A | 955 | 2.21 | |
| Turnout | | 43,248 | 54.84 | −0.93 |
2nd round result
| LREM (Ensemble) | Marie Lebec | 25,888 | 65.69 | +4.30 |
| LFI (NUPÉS) | Céline Bourdon | 13,522 | 34.31 | N/A |
| Turnout | | 39,410 | 52.33 | +8.28 |
| LREM hold | | | | |

=== 2017 ===
Legislative Election 2017: Yvelines's 4th constituency
| Party | Candidate | Votes | % | ±% |
|---|---|---|---|---|
| LREM | Marie Lebec | 20,980 | 47.92 | |
| LR | Ghislain Fournier | 9,803 | 22.39 | |
| LFI | Faustine Huet | 3,163 | 7.22 | |
| FN | Marie-Jo Renaudin | 2,334 | 5.33 | |
| PS | Mnika Belala | 1,828 | 4.18 | |
| EELV | Marie-Françoise Darras | 1,739 | 3.97 | |
| DVD | Emmanuel Loevenbruck | 1,216 | 2.78 | |
| Others | N/A | 2,718 | | |
| Turnout | | 43,781 | 55.77 | |
2nd round result
| LREM | Marie Lebec | 21,662 | 61.39 | |
| LR | Ghislain Fournier | 13,625 | 38.61 | |
| Turnout | | 35,287 | 44.95 | |
| LREM gain from LR | | | | |

=== 2012 ===
Legislative Election 2012: Yvelines's 4th constituency
| Party | Candidate | Votes | % | ±% |
|---|---|---|---|---|
| UMP | Pierre Lequiller | 16,417 | 36.00 | |
| PS | Sandrine Dubos | 13,282 | 29.12 | |
| DVD | Arnaud de Bourrousse | 3,812 | 8.36 | |
| FN | Liliane Taraud | 3,562 | 7.81 | |
| DVD | Jean Roger Davin | 2,558 | 5.61 | |
| EELV | José Tomas | 2,065 | 4.53 | |
| FG | Florence Bihet | 1,658 | 3.64 | |
| MoDem | Elisabeth Saunier | 1,567 | 3.44 | |
| Others | N/A | 686 | | |
| Turnout | | 45,966 | 59.80 | |
2nd round result
| UMP | Pierre Lequiller | 24,472 | 58.07 | |
| PS | Sandrine Dubos | 17,669 | 41.93 | |
| Turnout | | 43,208 | 56.21 | |
| UMP hold | | | | |

=== 2007 ===
Legislative Election 2007: Yvelines's 4th constituency
| Party | Candidate | Votes | % | ±% |
|---|---|---|---|---|
| UMP | Pierre Lequiller | 25,473 | 54.34 | |
| PS | Jacqueline Penez | 8,436 | 18.00 | |
| MoDem | Elisabeth Saunier | 6,463 | 13.79 | |
| LV | Carlos Lopes | 2,009 | 4.29 | |
| FN | Gabrielle de Lestang | 1,460 | 3.11 | |
| PCF | Florence Bihet | 1,082 | 2.31 | |
| Others | N/A | 1,951 | | |
| Turnout | | 47,331 | 62.59 | |
| UMP hold | | | | |

=== 2002 ===
Legislative Election 2002: Yvelines's 4th constituency
| Party | Candidate | Votes | % | ±% |
|---|---|---|---|---|
| UMP | Pierre Lequiller | 25,893 | 55.28 | |
| PS | Olga Fontaine | 10,889 | 23.25 | |
| FN | Françoise Puech | 4,030 | 8.60 | |
| LV | Carlos Lopes | 1,704 | 3.64 | |
| PCF | Eric Prevost | 974 | 2.08 | |
| Others | N/A | 3,347 | | |
| Turnout | | 47,412 | 67.83 | |
| UMP gain from UDF | | | | |

=== 1997 ===
Legislative Election 1997: Yvelines's 4th constituency
| Party | Candidate | Votes | % | ±% |
|---|---|---|---|---|
| UDF | Pierre Lequiller | 18,973 | 43.94 | |
| PS | Jean-Pierre Mottura | 9,081 | 21.03 | |
| FN | Hubert Cottin | 5,301 | 12.28 | |
| PCF | Claude Boivin | 2,521 | 5.84 | |
| LV | Janick Giroux | 1,934 | 4.48 | |
| DVD | Ghilain de Compreignac | 1,665 | 3.86 | |
| LO | Jean-Louis Ajzenberg | 1,058 | 2.45 | |
| MEI | Remy Mojika | 955 | 2.21 | |
| DIV | Xavier Jacquey | 864 | 2.00 | |
| Others | N/A | 831 | | |
| Turnout | | 44,620 | 65.76 | |
2nd round result
| UDF | Pierre Lequiller | 27,954 | 62.50 | |
| PS | Jean-Pierre Mottura | 16,772 | 37.50 | |
| Turnout | | 46,780 | 68.97 | |
| UDF hold | | | | |

== Sources ==
Official results of French elections from 2002: "Résultats électoraux officiels en France" (in French).
