= Pierre Lequiller =

French politician

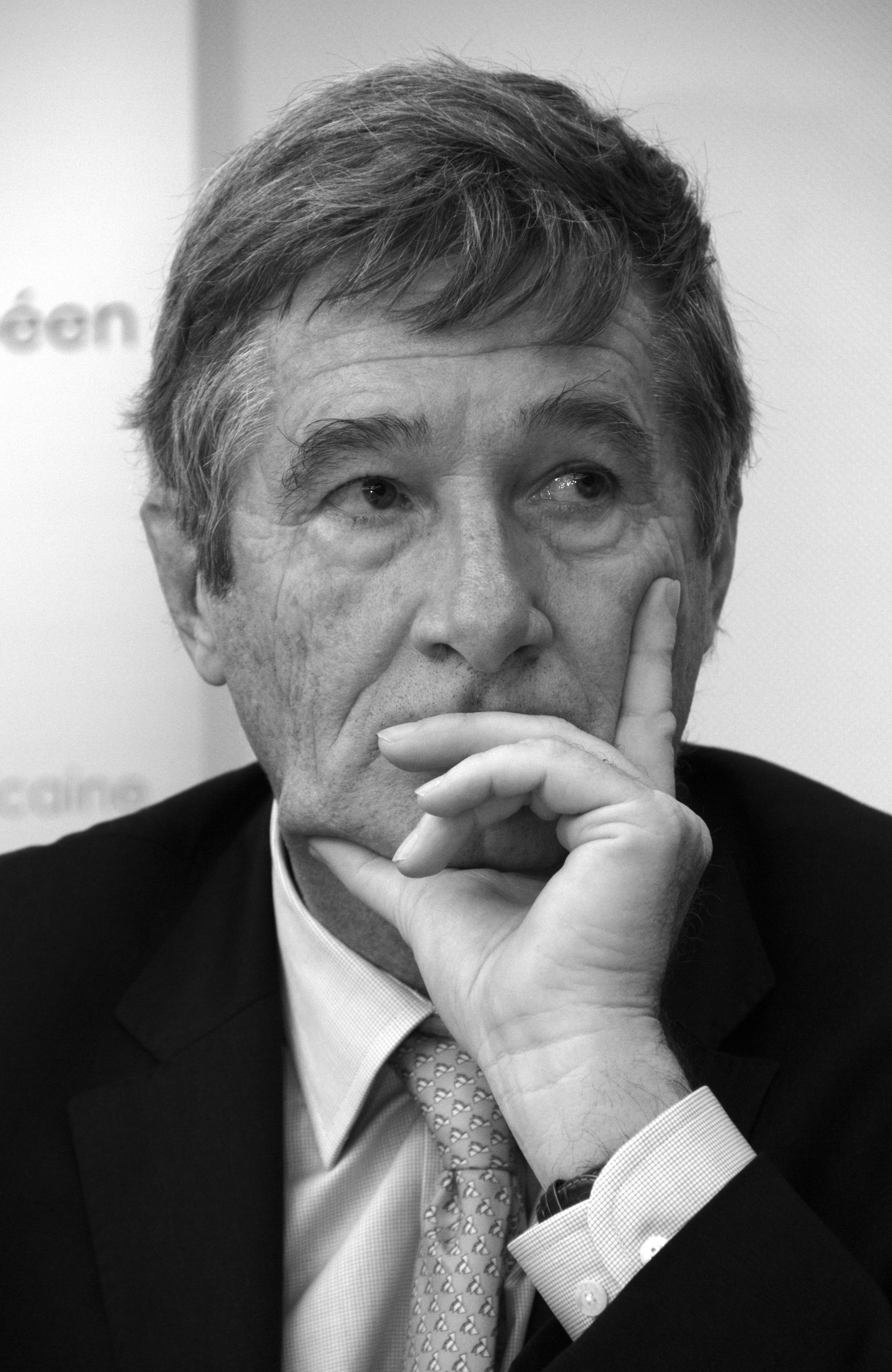
- Pierre Lequiller in May 2013

Member of the National Assembly for Yvelines's 4th constituency
- In office 1988–2017
- Succeeded by: Marie Lebec

Personal details
- Born: 4 December 1949 (age 76) London, United Kingdom
- Education: HEC Paris; Sciences Po

Pierre Lequiller (born December 4, 1949) was a member of the National Assembly of France. He represented the Yvelines department, as a member of the Union for a Popular Movement. He was the Member of Parliament for Yvelines's 4th constituency from 1988 to 2017.

He is a graduate of HEC Paris and Sciences Po.
