= Philippe Benassaya =

French politician

Member of the National Assembly for Yvelines's 11th constituency
- In office 28 September 2020 – 21 June 2022
- Preceded by: Nadia Hai
- Succeeded by: William Martinet

Mayor of Bois-d'Arcy
- In office 2014–2020
- Preceded by: Claude Vuillet
- Succeeded by: Jean-Philippe Luce

Personal details
- Born: 4 August 1964 (age 62) Pantin, France
- Party: The Republicans
- Education: Paris-Sorbonne University

Philippe Benassaya (born 4 August 1964) is a French Republican politician who was elected Member of Parliament for Yvelines's 11th constituency in a by-election in 2020.

He lost his seat in the first round of the 2022 French legislative election.
