= Mathilde Androuët =

French politician (born 1984)

Mathilde Androuët MEP
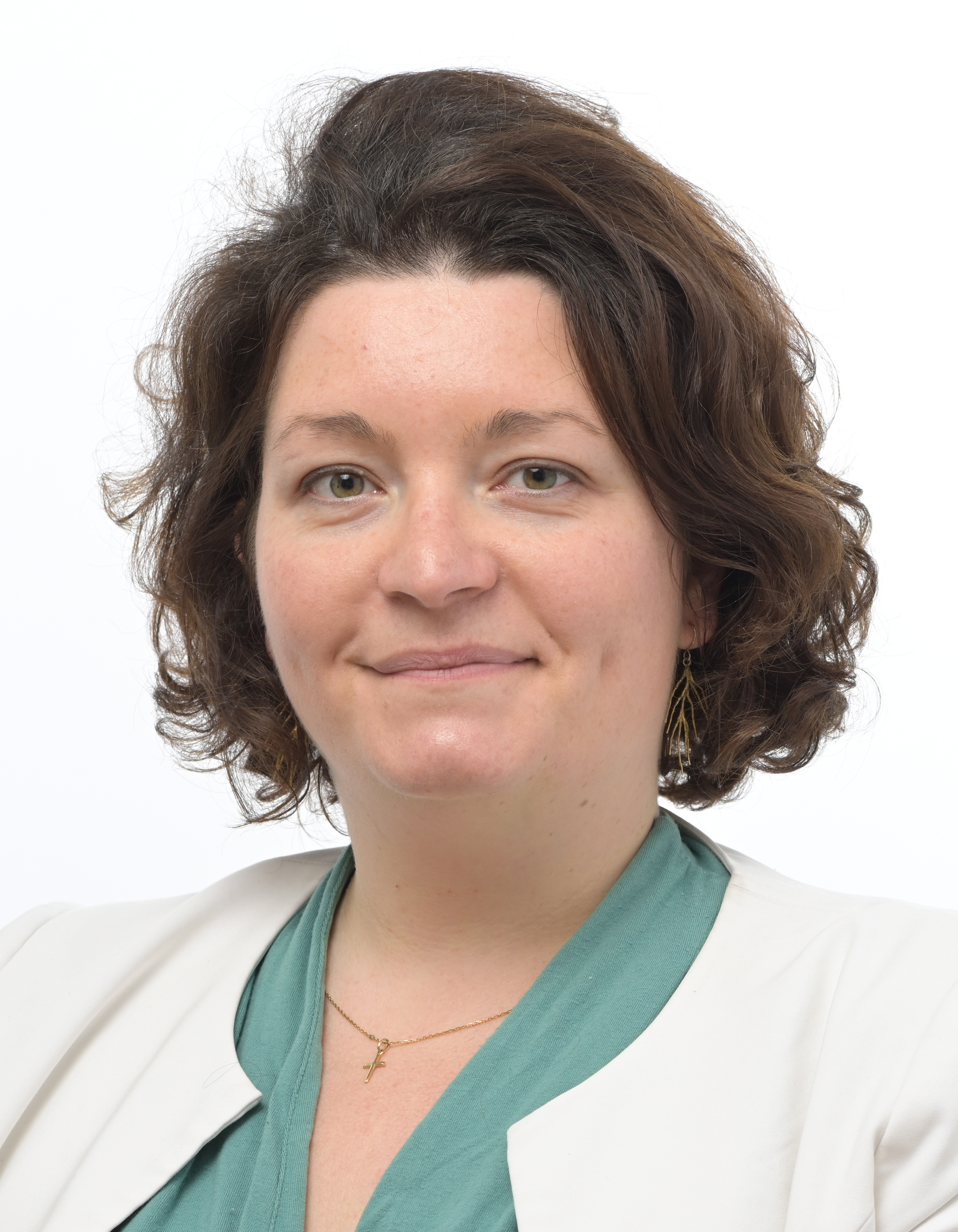

Member of the European Parliament for France
- Incumbent
- Assumed office 2 July 2019

Personal details
- Born: 3 July 1984 (age 42) Rueil-Malmaison, France
- Party: National Rally
- Education: Sciences Po Aix
- Profession: Politician

Mathilde Androuët (born 3 July 1984) is a French politician. She was elected as a National Rally (part of the Identity and Democracy group) Member of the European Parliament (MEP) in the 2019 European parliamentary election. She was re-elected in 2024.

== Early life ==
Androuët was born on 3 July 1984 in Rueil-Malmaison, Paris, France. Her father Didier Palix was a candidate for National Republican Movement in 2001, and contested the 2015 French departmental elections on behalf of the National Front. She grew up in Chatou and Houilles in the Île-de-France region. Androuët graduated from Sciences Po Aix in Aix-en-Provence. After graduation, she worked for liberal think tank Terra Nova for six months in 2010.

She became a member of the National Front in 2011. In 2014, she became a parliamentary assistant to Florian Philippot. Androuët contested the 2017 French legislative election in Yvelines's 11th constituency but finished in 5th place in the first round.

== European Parliament ==
She stood as a National Rally candidate in France in the 2019 European parliamentary election. Androuët was 22nd on her party's list, and was elected as one of its 22 MEPs. (Note: In the election, the party won 23 seats however Jean-Lin Lacapelle was elected in a reserve seat that he can only take if the United Kingdom leaves the European Union.) She is a member of the Identity and Democracy group. In the European Parliament, she is a member of the Committee on Regional Development.
