= Cyril Nauth =

French politician

Mayor of Mantes-la-Ville
- In office 4 April 2014 – 1 July 2020

Personal details
- Born: 19 December 1981 (age 44) Dijon
- Party: National Rally

Cyril Nauth (born on 19 December 1981 in Dijon), is a French politician.

== Biography ==
Cyril Nauth born on 19 December 1981, and was the mayor of Mantes-la-Ville from 2014 to 2020.
