= Jean-Jacques Aillagon =

French politician

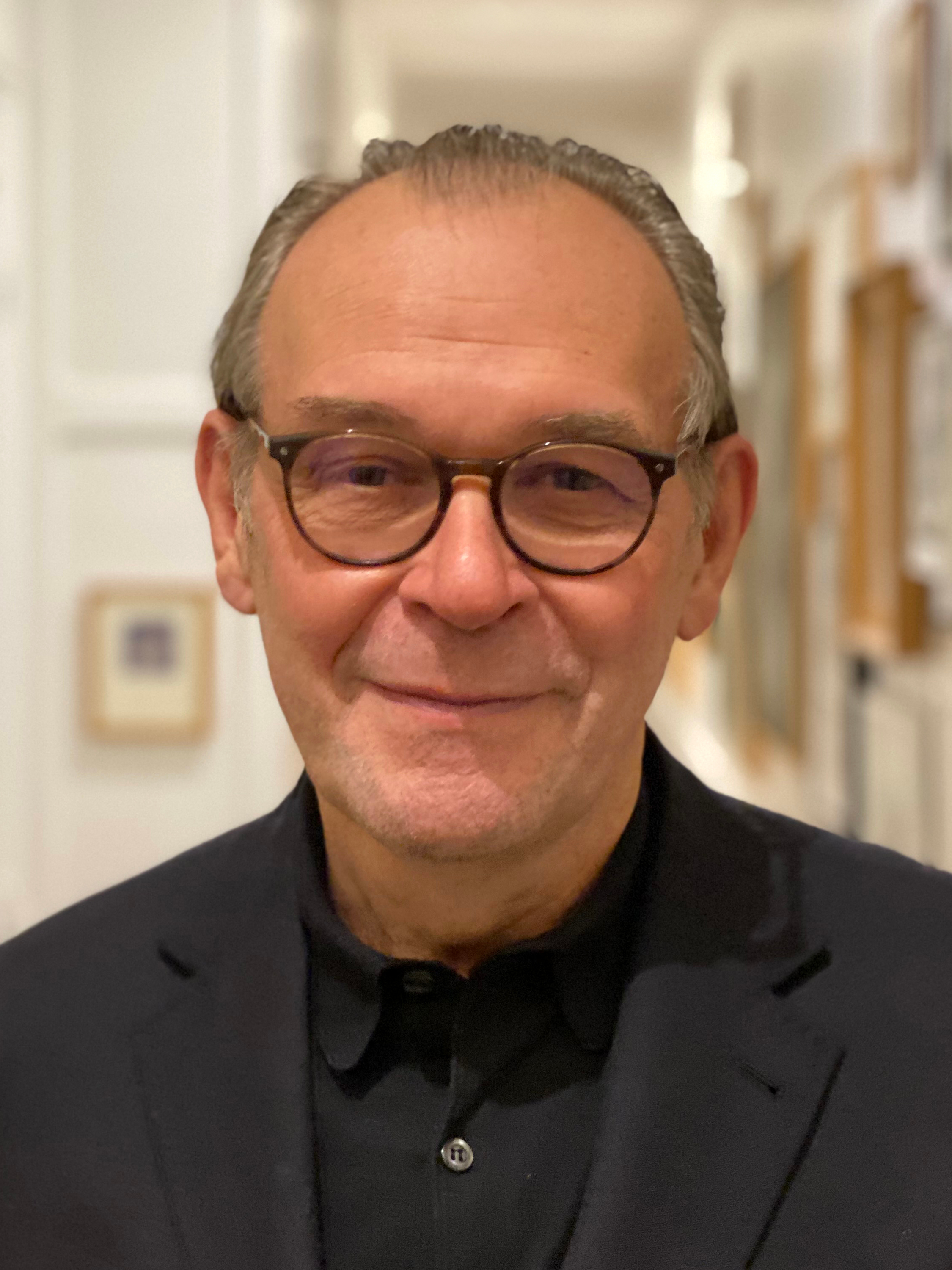
- Jean-Jacques Aillagon (2021)

French Minister of Culture
- In office 7 May 2002 – 31 March 2004
- President: Jacques Chirac
- Prime Minister: Jean-Pierre Raffarin
- Preceded by: Catherine Tasca
- Succeeded by: Renaud Donnedieu de Vabres

Personal details
- Born: 2 October 1946 (age 79) Metz, France
- Party: UMP

Jean-Jacques Aillagon (French pronunciation: [ʒɑ̃ ʒak ajaɡɔ̃]; born 2 October 1946, Metz) is a French museum director and politician.

Aillagon was a close confidant of Jacques Chirac, as well as a member of the Union for a Popular Movement (UMP) political party. He became Minister of Culture and Communication in 2002, a post in which he served until 2004. During his time in government, Aillagon worked on a law concerning philanthropy, patronage, and foundations in France.

Outside of politics, he has been the chairman at the Centre Georges Pompidou, the CEO of the worldwide satellite TV station TV5MONDE, and president of the Château de Versailles. Jean-Jacques Aillagon is a confidant of François Pinault and has worked as his art advisor.

Aillagon is openly gay.

== Biography ==
- 2005: Elected CEO of TV5MONDE, the fourth largest global television network available around the world after the BBC, CNN and MTV.
- 2002-2004: Jean-Jacques Aillagon was appointed Minister for Culture and Communication on 7 May 2002.
- 2002: Renewal, by the Decree of 7 March 2002, of his appointment as Chairman of the Georges Pompidou National Centre of Art and Culture
- 1999: Renewal, by the Decree of 26 March 1999, of his appointment as Chairman of the Georges Pompidou National Centre of Art and Culture
- 1996: Appointed, by the Decree of 17 December 1996, Chairman of Mission 2000 in France. Tasked by the Prime Minister with reflecting on the organization of France's celebration of the start of the third millennium
- Appointed, by the Decree of 28 March 1996, Chairman of the Georges Pompidou National Centre of Art and Culture
- 1995: In overall charge of organizing "France-Egypt Year" (1997–1998)
- Elected Chairman of the Association of Cultural Affairs Directors of France's major cities
- 1993: City of Paris' Cultural Affairs Director
- 1992: Managing Director of the Paris Vidéothèque [video library]
- 1990: Coordinator of the celebrations marking the centenary of General de Gaulle's birth
- 1988: Head of the City of Paris' cultural events department
- 1985: Deputy Director of Cultural Affairs of the City of Paris, and Director of the Cultural Information Office
- 1982: Trustee of the National Museum of Modern Art at the Georges Pompidou Centre
- 1981: Assistant Director of the École nationale supérieure des Beaux-Arts, responsible for the Institution's cultural and scientific programme
- 1978: Head of the External Relations and Exhibitions Department at the École nationale supérieure des Beaux-Arts
- 1977: Head of the Architectural Archives Department at the École nationale supérieure des Beaux-Arts
- 1976: On secondment to the Ministry of Culture. Researcher at the Architectural Studies and Research Centre
- 1973-1976: Teacher at Egletons and Tulle lycées (Corrèze).

Political offices
Preceded by Catherine Tasca	Minister of Culture; 2002–2004	Succeeded by Renaud Donnedieu de Vabres
