= Laurent Mazaury =

French politician (born 1965)

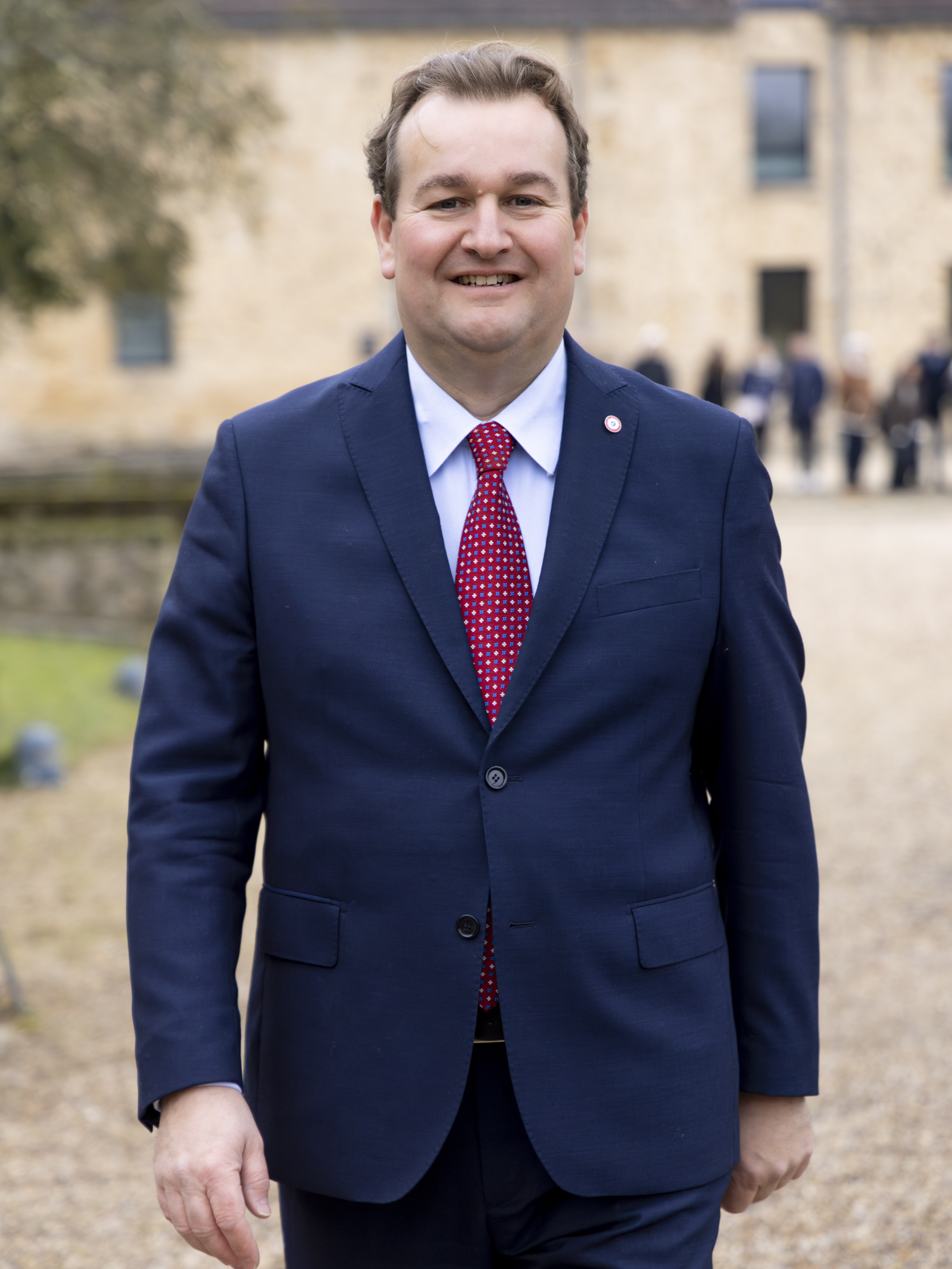
- Laurent Mazaury in 2025

Member of the National Assembly for Yvelines's 11th constituency
- Incumbent
- Assumed office 8 July 2024
- Preceded by: William Martinet

Personal details
- Born: 23 August 1965 (age 60) Pantin, France
- Party: Union of Democrats and Independents

Laurent Mazaury (born 23 August 1965) is a French politician from the Union of Democrats and Independents (UDI). He has been deputy for Yvelines's 11th constituency since 2024.

== See also ==
- List of deputies of the 17th National Assembly of France
