= Maître d'art =

Title awarded by the French Ministry of Culture

Maître d'art (Master of Art) is a title awarded for life by the French Ministry of Culture to distinguished professionals from the arts and crafts, for their exceptional expertise and their ability to pass on their knowledge. This title is the French version of Living Human Treasures recognized by UNESCO.

Since the creation of the title in 1994, one hundred and forty-one Masters of Art have been appointed in one hundred and one craft trades, classified into sixteen different fields of activity. Eighty of these winners are still active in 2021.

France has 107 appointees since the creation of this title, of which 78 are active.

The title of Maître d'art was created by the Ministry of Culture in 1994 in order to perpetuate the remarkable and rare know-how of the crafts that participate in French economic and cultural life. Like Japan's “living national treasures”, it promotes skills and knowledge considered to be strong components of intangible cultural heritage.

In 2012, the Ministry of Culture entrusted the management of the selection procedure and the master of art - students at the National Institute of Art Trades.

The list of nine winners in 2019 is accessible on the site of the French Ministry of Culture.
