= William Martinet =

French politician

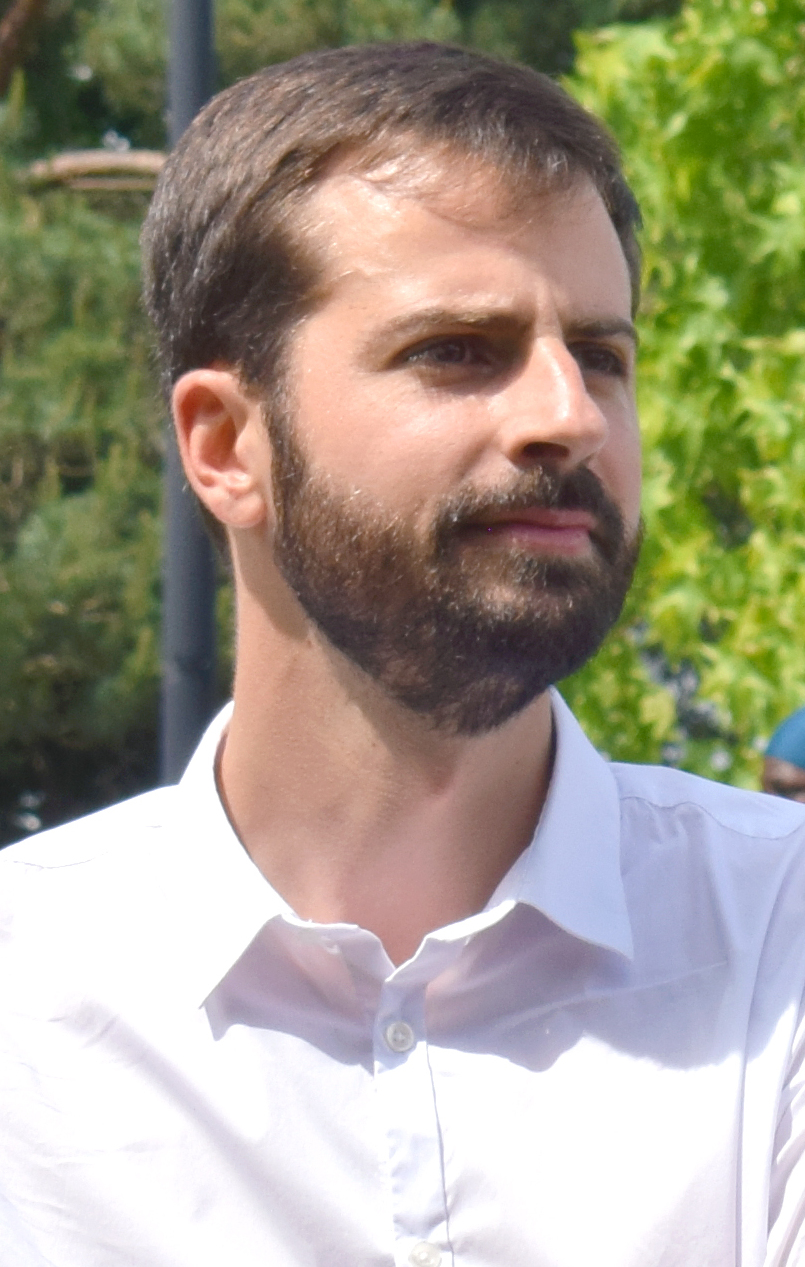
- William Martinet in 2022

Member of the National Assembly for Yvelines's 11th constituency
- In office 22 June 2022 – 9 June 2024
- Preceded by: Philippe Benassaya
- Succeeded by: Laurent Mazaury

President of the UNEF
- In office 2013–2016
- Preceded by: Emmanuel Zemmour
- Succeeded by: Lilâ Le Bas

Personal details
- Born: 6 September 1988 (age 38) Paris, France
- Party: La France Insoumise
- Education: University of Versailles Saint-Quentin-en-Yvelines; Sorbonne Paris North University

William Martinet (born 6 September 1988) is a French politician from La France Insoumise. He was elected member of the National Assembly for Yvelines's 11th constituency in the 2022 French legislative election.

== See also ==
- List of deputies of the 16th National Assembly of France
