= Ministry of Culture (France) =

Government ministry of France

Minister of Culture
- Ministre de la Culture
- Incumbent; Catherine Pégard since 26 February 2026
- Style: Madame la ministre
- Member of: Council of Ministers
- Reports to: President of the Republic and to Parliament
- Residence: Palais-Royal
- Seat: Paris, France
- Appointer: President of the Republic
- Term length: No fixed term; Remains in office while commanding the confidence of the National Assembly and the President of the Republic
- Constituting instrument: Constitution of 4 October 1958
- Formation: 8 January 1959
- First holder: André Malraux
- Salary: €9,940 per month
- Website: www.culture.gouv.fr

The Ministry of Culture (French: Ministère de la Culture [ministɛʁ də la kyltyʁ]) is the ministry of the Government of France in charge of national museums and the monuments historiques. Its goal is to maintain the French identity through the promotion and protection of the arts (visual, plastic, theatrical, musical, dance, architectural, literary, televisual and cinematographic) on national soil and abroad. Its budget is mainly dedicated to the management of the Archives Nationales (six national sites and hundred decentralised storage facilities) and the regional Maisons de la culture (culture centres).

Its main office is in the Palais-Royal in the 1st arrondissement of Paris on the Rue de Valois. It is headed by the Minister of Culture, a cabinet member. The incumbent is Catherine Pégard, a newspaper editor who directed the management of the Palace of Versailles.

== History ==
Deriving from the Italian and Burgundian courts of the Renaissance, the notion that the state had a key role to play in the sponsoring of artistic production and that the arts were linked to national prestige was found in France from at least the 16th century on. During the pre-revolutionary period, these ideas are apparent in such things as the creation of the Académie française, the Académie de peinture et de sculpture and other state-sponsored institutions of artistic production, and through the cultural policies of Louis XIV's minister Jean-Baptiste Colbert.

The modern post of Minister of Culture was created by Charles de Gaulle in 1959 and the first officeholder was the writer André Malraux. Malraux established the goals of the droit à la culture ('right to culture'), an idea which had been incorporated in the Constitution of France and the Universal Declaration of Human Rights (1948), by democratising access to culture, while also achieving the Gaullist aim of elevating the "grandeur" ('greatness') of post-war France. To this end, he created numerous regional cultural centres throughout France and actively sponsored the arts. Malraux's artistic tastes included the modern arts and the avant-garde, but on the whole he remained conservative.

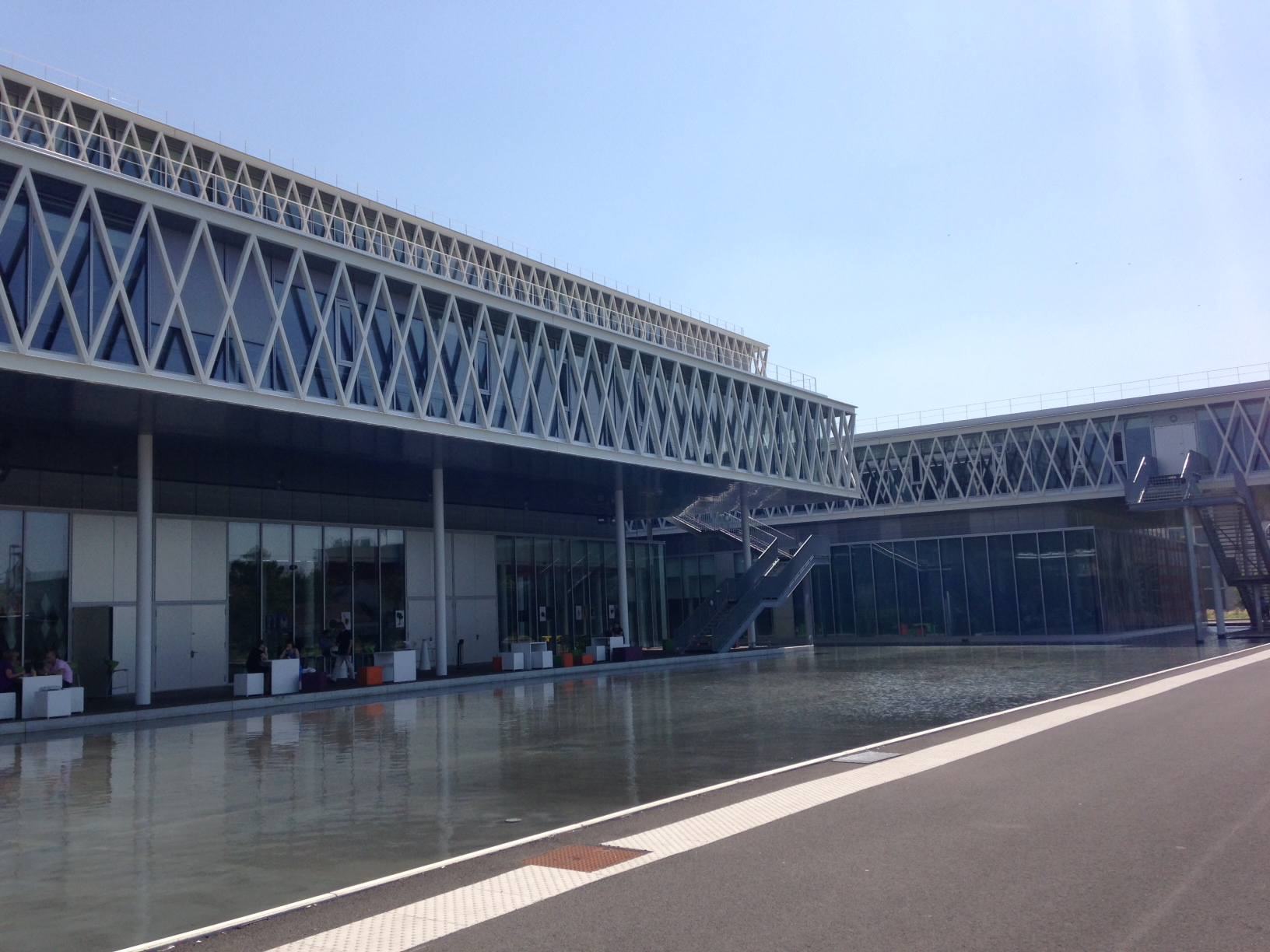
One of France's six National Archives sites operated by the Ministry of Culture, in Pierrefitte-sur-Seine

Under President François Mitterrand the Minister of Culture was Jack Lang who showed himself to be far more open to popular cultural production, including jazz, rock and roll, rap music, graffiti, bande dessinées, fashion and food. His famous phrase "économie et culture, même combat" ('economy and culture: it's the same fight') is representative of his commitment to cultural democracy and to active national sponsorship and participation in cultural production. In addition to the creation of the Fête de la Musique and overseeing the French Revolution bicentennial (1989), he was in charge of the massive architectural program of the François Mitterrand years (the so-called Grands travaux; 'Great Works') that gave permission for the building of the Bibliothèque nationale, the new Louvre, the Arab World Institute, the Musée d'Orsay, the Opéra-Bastille, the "Grande Arche" of La Défense (the Parisian business quarter), the new seat of the French Ministry for the Economy and Finance, the Jean-Marie Tjibaou Cultural Centre, and the Cité des Sciences et de l'Industrie and Cité de la Musique, both in the Parc de la Villette.

The Ministry of Jacques Toubon was notable for a number of laws (the "Toubon Laws") enacted for the preservation of the French language, both in advertisements (all ads must include a French translation of foreign words) and on the radio (35% of songs on French radio stations must be in French), ostensibly in reaction to the presence of English.

== Ministers of Culture ==
The following people were appointed Minister of Culture of France:

- February 1959: André Malraux
- June 1969: Edmond Michelet
- October 1970: André Bettencourt
- January 1971: Jacques Duhamel
- April 1973: Maurice Druon
- March 1974: Alain Peyrefitte
- June 1974: Michel Guy
- August 1976: Françoise Giroud
- March 1977: Michel d'Ornano
- April 1978: Jean-Philippe Lecat
- March 1981: Michel d'Ornano
- May 1981: Jack Lang
- March 1986: François Léotard
- May 1988: Jack Lang
- March 1993: Jacques Toubon
- May 1995: Philippe Douste-Blazy
- June 1997: Catherine Trautmann
- March 2000: Catherine Tasca
- May 2002: Jean-Jacques Aillagon
- March 2004: Renaud Donnedieu de Vabres
- May 2007: Christine Albanel
- June 2009: Frédéric Mitterrand
- May 2012: Aurélie Filippetti
- August 2014: Fleur Pellerin
- February 2016: Audrey Azoulay
- May 2017: Françoise Nyssen
- October 2018: Franck Riester
- July 2020: Roselyne Bachelot
- May 2022: Rima Abdul Malak
- January 2024: Rachida Dati
- February 2026: Catherine Pégard

== Names of the Ministry of Culture ==
Since the French constitution does not identify specific ministers (merely speaking of "the minister in charge of" this or that), each government may label each ministry as they wish, or even have a broader ministry in charge of several governmental sectors. Hence, the ministry has gone through a number of different names:

- 1959: Ministère des Affaires culturelles
- 1974: Ministère des Affaires culturelles et de l'Environnement
- 1974: Secrétariat d'État à la Culture
- 1976: Ministère de la Culture et de l'Environnement
- 1978: Ministère de la Culture et de la Communication
- 1981: Ministère de la Culture
- 1986: Ministère de la Culture et de la Communication
- 1988: Ministère de la Culture, de la Communication, des Grands Travaux et du Bicentenaire
- 1991: Ministère de la Culture et de la Communication
- 1992: Ministère de l'Éducation nationale et de la Culture
- 1993: Ministère de la Culture et de la Francophonie
- 1995: Ministère de la Culture
- 1997: Ministère de la Culture et de la Communication
- 2017: Ministère de la Culture

== Organisation ==
=== Central administration ===
The Ministry of Culture is made up of a variety of internal divisions, including:

- Direction de l'administration générale (DAG)
- Direction de l'architecture et du patrimoine (DAPA) in charge of national monuments and heritage
  - General inventory of cultural heritage maintains extensive databases of historical sites and objects via the Base Mérimée and monument historique status.
- Direction des archives de France (DAF) in charge of the National Archives
- Direction du livre et de la lecture (DLL) in charge of French literature and the book trade
- Direction de la musique, de la danse, du théâtre et des spectacles (DMDTS) in charge of music, dance and theater
- Direction des Musées de France (DMF) in charge of labelled museums

The Ministry has access to one inter-ministerial division:

- Direction du développement des médias (DDM) in charge of developing and expanding the French media (although French public television is run through the public-service company France Télévisions)

The Ministry also runs three "delegations" (administrative boards):

- Délégation aux arts plastiques (DAP) in charge of the visual and sculptural arts
- Délégation au développement et aux affaires internationales (DDAI) in charge of international affairs and French art
- Délégation générale à la langue française et aux langues de France (DGLFLF) in charge of the French language and languages of France

Finally, the Ministry shares in the management of the National Centre of Cinema (Centre national de la cinématographie, CNC), a public institution.

The Alliance française is run by the Ministry of Europe and Foreign Affairs.

=== Other services ===
On the national level, the Ministry also runs:

- Regional Cultural Affairs (Direction régionale des affaires culturelles, DRAC)
- Departmental Architecture and Monuments (Services départementaux de l'architecture et du patrimoine, SDAP)
- Departmental Archives under the direction of the departmental councils
- Centre National de la Danse, institution for the study and preservation of dance

== Cultural activities ==
The Ministry of Culture is responsible for, or a major sponsor of, a number of annual cultural activities, including the Fête de la Musique, the Maison de la culture de Grenoble, the Festival d'Avignon, the Public Establishment of the Palace, Museum and National Estate of Versailles, the Joconde (online database of objects in French museums), the Base Mérimée (database of listed heritage monuments), and the Maître d'art program.
