= Public Establishment of the Palace, Museum and National Estate of Versailles =

French public establishment

- Native name: Établissement public du château, du musée et du domaine national de Versailles
- Company type: French public establishment
- Industry: management of historic sites and monuments and similar tourist attractions
- Founded: 1995
- Founder: French Ministry of Culture
- Headquarters: Palace of Versailles, Versailles, France
- Key people: Catherine Pégard
- Website: www.chateauversailles.fr

The Public Establishment of the Palace, Museum and National Estate of Versailles (French: Établissement public du château, du musée et du domaine national de Versailles, in short the Établissement public du château de Versailles) is a French public establishment founded in 1995, and working under the supervision of the Ministry of Culture, in order to administer the Palace of Versailles and its domain. It is headed by Catherine Pégard, president of the public establishment, assisted by Béatrix Saule, as director of the National Museum of Versailles and Trianon. The Palace of Versailles is a former royal residence commissioned by King Louis XIV.

== See also ==
- Musée de l'Histoire de France (Versailles)
