= Catherine Tasca =

French politician

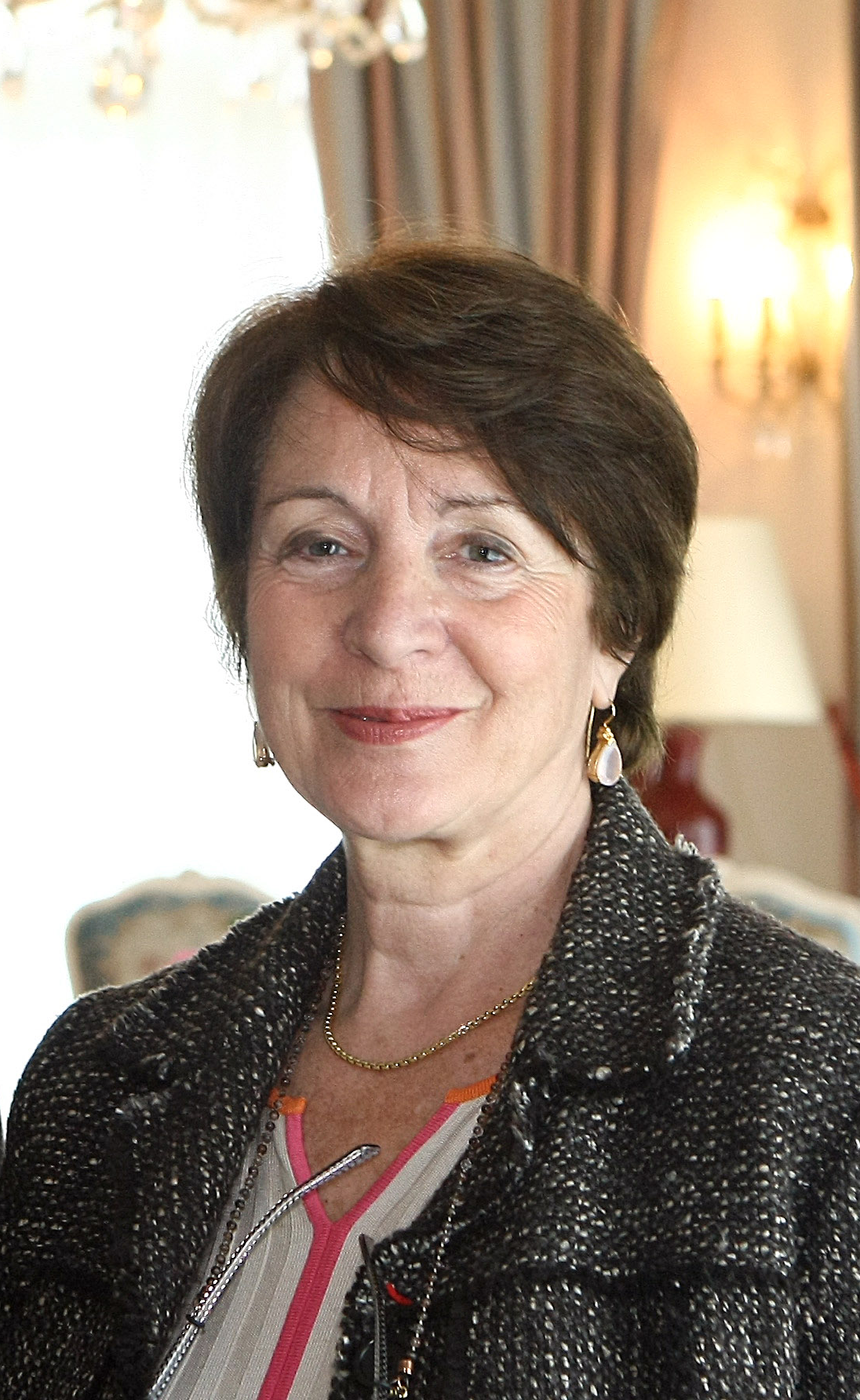

French Minister of Culture
- In office 2000–2002
- President: Jacques Chirac
- Prime Minister: Lionel Jospin
- Preceded by: Catherine Trautmann
- Succeeded by: Jean-Jacques Aillagon

Senator for Yvelines
- In office 26 September 2004 – 1 October 2017

Personal details
- Born: 13 December 1941 (age 84) Lyon, France
- Party: Socialist Party
- Education: Sciences Po, ÉNA

Catherine Tasca (French pronunciation: [katʁin taska]; born 13 December 1941 in Lyon) is a French politician of the Socialist Party (PS) who served as a member of the Senate of France, representing the Yvelines department from 2004 to 2017, including as the Senate's vice-president. From 2000 to 2002 she was Minister of Culture in France.

== Early life and education ==
Tasca is the daughter of Angelo Tasca, a former founding member of the Communist Party of Italy from Piedmont. After expulsion from the Communist Party, Angelo went into exile in France. There he joined the French Section of the Workers' International in 1934 and later supported the Vichy regime in the 1940s.

She is a graduate of the Institut d’études politiques de Paris (1963) and the École nationale d’administration (1967).

== Political career ==
During her time as Minister of Culture, Tasca caused a diplomatic incident when she announced that she would boycott the opening of the Paris Book Fair in 2002, which celebrated Italy, if it were attended by Italy's right-wing prime minister, Silvio Berlusconi.

Ahead of the Socialist Party's 2011 primaries, Tasca endorsed Martine Aubry as the party's candidate for the 2012 presidential election.

Political offices
Preceded by Catherine Trautmann	Minister of Culture; 2000–2002	Succeeded by Jean-Jacques Aillagon
