= Houilles =

- Commune
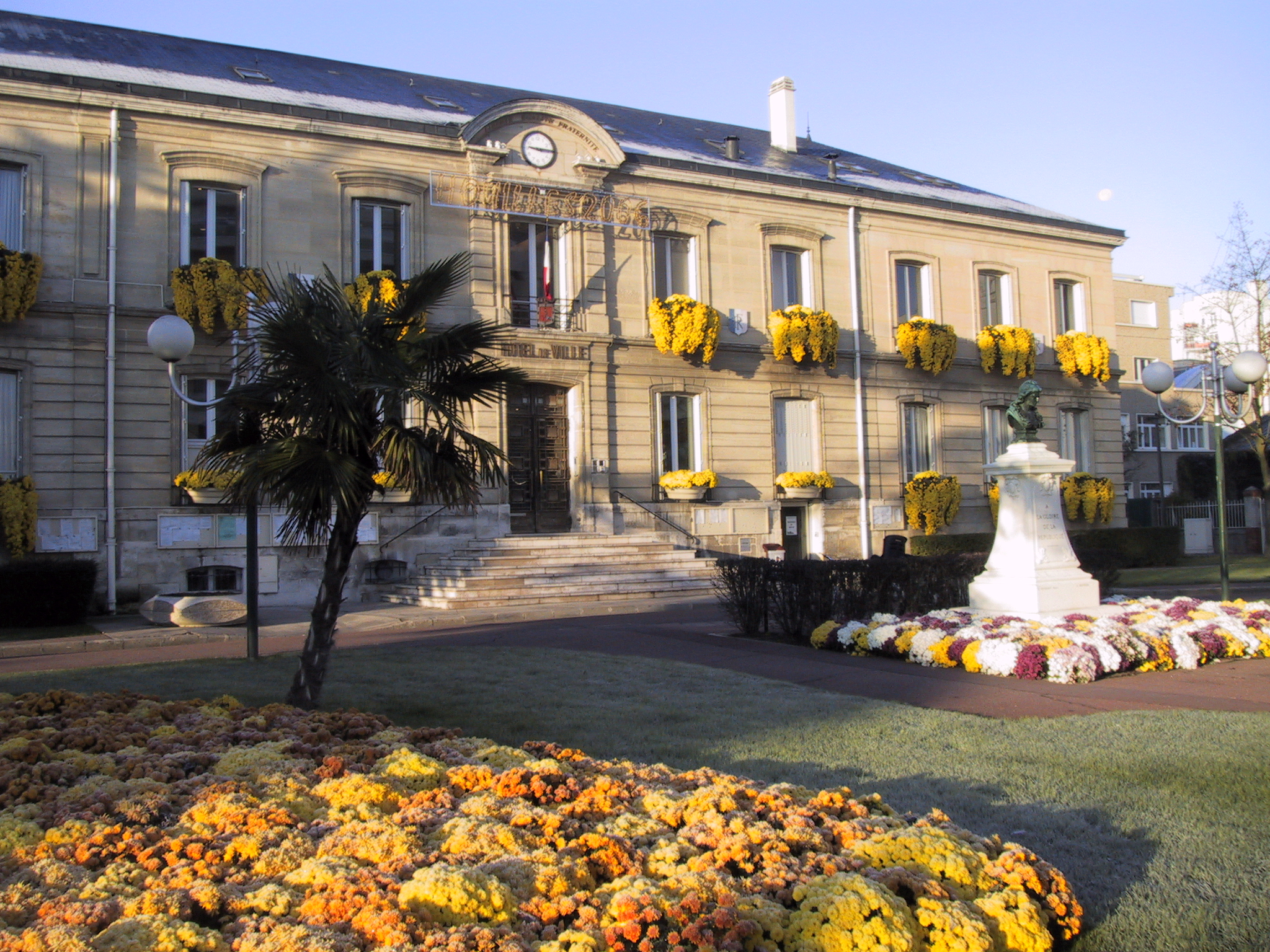
- The Hôtel de Ville

- Coat of arms

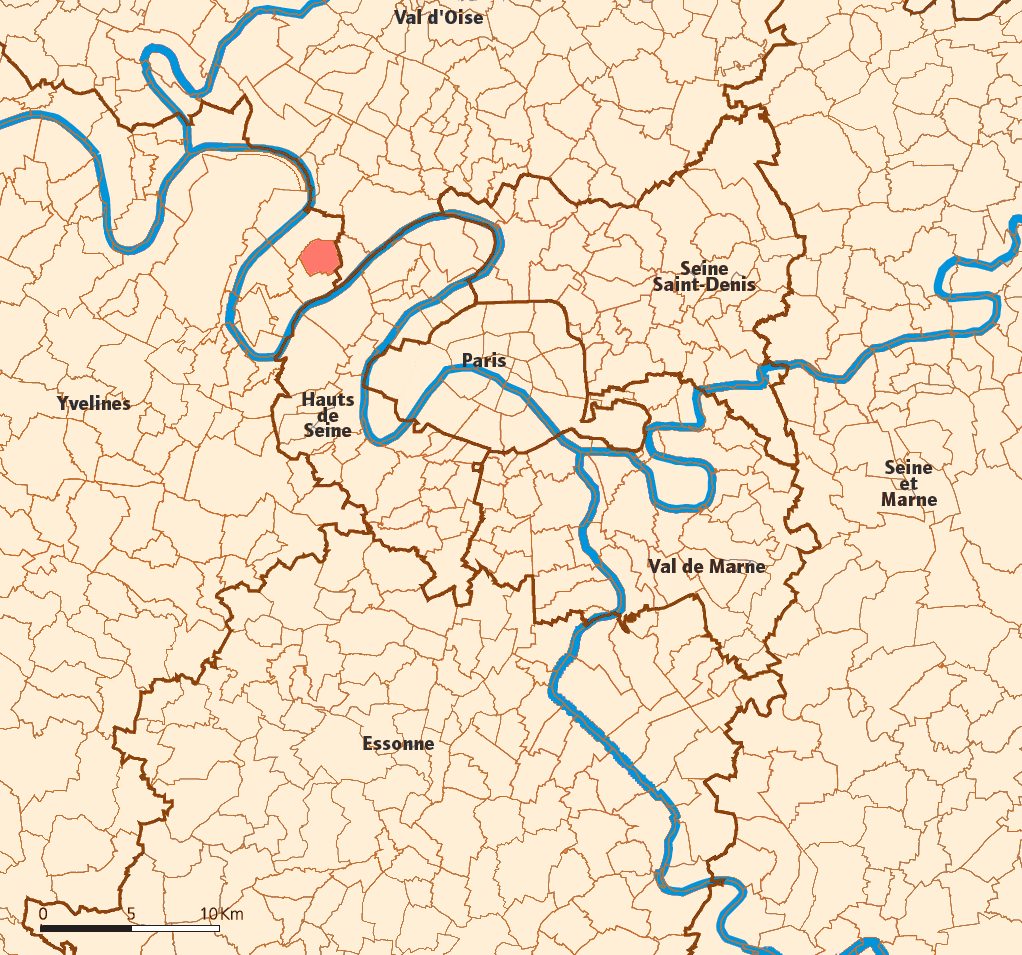
- Location (in red) within Paris inner and outer suburbs
- Location of Houilles
- Location within France Location within Île-de-France (region)
- Coordinates: 48°55′34″N 2°11′21″E
- Country: France
- Region: Île-de-France
- Department: Yvelines
- Arrondissement: Saint-Germain-en-Laye
- Canton: Houilles
- Intercommunality: CA Saint Germain Boucles Seine

Government
  - Mayor (2020–2026): Julien Chambon
- Area^{1}: 4.43 km^{2} (1.71 sq mi)
- Highest elevation: 57 m (187 ft)
- Lowest elevation: 27 m (89 ft)
- Population (2023): 33,983
  - Density: 7,670/km^{2} (19,900/sq mi)
- Time zone: UTC+01:00 (CET)
  - Summer (DST): UTC+02:00 (CEST)
- INSEE/Postal code: 78311 /78800
- ^{1} French Land Register data, which excludes lakes, ponds, glaciers > 1 km^{2} (0.386 sq mi or 247 acres) and river estuaries.

Houilles (French pronunciation: [uj]) is a commune in the Yvelines department in the Île-de-France region in north-central France. It is a northwestern suburb of Paris, located 14.2 km (8.8 mi) from the center of Paris.

== History ==
The Hôtel de Ville is a former private house which was acquired and converted by the town council in 1905.

Until 2000, the command post of the French Navy's Ballistic Missile Submarine Force was based at Houilles.

Victor Schœlcher, a French abolitionist writer in the 19th century and the main spokesman for a group from Paris who worked for the abolition of slavery died in Houilles on 25 December 1893. A nursery school, a street and a statue carry his name. The house in which he died in 1893 is at 26 Avenue Schœlcher. The commune of Houilles acquired the house in 2011.

== Population ==
Historical population

Year	Pop.	±% p.a.
1793	1,651	—
1800	1,290	−3.46%
1806	1,144	−1.98%
1821	1,227	+0.47%
1831	1,265	+0.31%
1836	1,191	−1.20%
1841	1,156	−0.59%
1846	1,230	+1.25%
1851	1,185	−0.74%
1856	1,203	+0.30%
1861	1,275	+1.17%
1866	1,433	+2.36%
1872	1,256	−2.17%
1876	1,407	+2.88%
1881	1,737	+4.30%
1886	1,961	+2.46%
1891	2,331	+3.52%
1896	2,780	+3.59%
1901	3,824	+6.58%

Year	Pop.	±% p.a.
1906	4,946	+5.28%
1911	7,092	+7.47%
1921	10,274	+3.78%
1926	15,153	+8.08%
1931	19,078	+4.71%
1936	19,799	+0.74%
1946	20,610	+0.40%
1954	22,974	+1.37%
1962	26,370	+1.74%
1968	29,338	+1.79%
1975	30,345	+0.48%
1982	29,537	−0.38%
1990	29,650	+0.05%
1999	29,634	−0.01%
2007	30,973	+0.55%
2012	32,399	+0.90%
2017	32,151	−0.15%
2023	33,983	+0.93%

Source: EHESS and INSEE (1968-2023)

== Transport ==
Houilles is served by Houilles–Carrières-sur-Seine station on Paris RER line A and on the Transilien Paris-Saint-Lazare suburban rail line.

== Education ==
Houilles has fifteen preschool and elementary schools and three junior high schools.

Junior high schools:

- Collège Alphonse-de-Lamartine
- Collège Guy-de-Maupassant
- Collège Sainte-Thérèse

Nearby senior high schools/sixth form colleges:

- Lycée Les-Pierres-Vives (Carrières-sur-Seine)
- Lycée Jules-Verne (Sartrouville)
- Lycée Évariste-Galois (Sartrouville)

== International relations ==
Houilles is twinned with:

- Celorico de Basto, Portugal
- Chesham, England, United Kingdom
- Friedrichsdorf, Germany
- Schœlcher, Martinique, France

== See also ==
- Communes of the Yvelines department
