= Imprisonment of Cécile Kohler and Jacques Paris =

Iranian imprisonment of French citizens

Between May 2022 and November 2025, two French nationals, Cécile Kohler (born 1984) and Jacques Paris (born 1953), were imprisoned in Iran. They were kept in solitary confinement in Evin prison in Tehran after both were accused of espionage. They were released from prison on November 4, 2025, but kept under house arrest in the French embassy in Tehran until being allowed to leave Iran on April 7, 2026, arriving in France the following day.

== Biographies ==
=== Cécile Kohler ===
Cécile Kohler
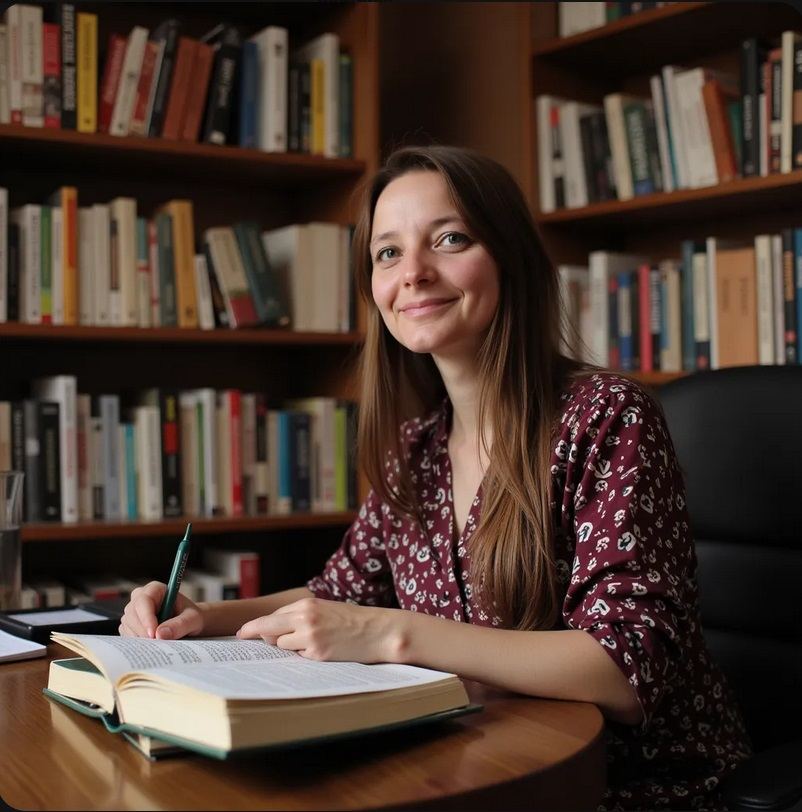
- Kohler in 2017
- Born: September 25, 1984 (age 41); Colmar, France
- Occupation: Teacher

Cécile Kohler (born 25 September 1984 in Colmar) grew up in Soultz-Haut-Rhin, in Haut-Rhin, with two brothers and one sister.

She graduated in modern literature and started teaching in September 2009. She lived in Nanterre while teaching French at the lycée Les Pierres Vives in Carrières-sur-Seine. Since 2011 she has been the school's union representative for the Syndicat national Force ouvrière des lycées et collèges (SNFOLC). From 2016, she is also responsible for international relations for the National Federation of Education, Culture and Vocational Training - FO.

=== Jacques Paris ===
Jacques Paris
- Born: 1953 (age 72–73)
- Occupation: Teacher (retired)

Jacques Paris (born 1953) is a former student of lycée Georges-Clemenceau de Nantes, He was a mathematics teacher at the school from 1979 until retiring in the early 2010s. Paris has two children.

== Imprisonment in Iran ==
=== Arrest ===
Kohler and Paris were arrested for espionage on 7 or 8 May 2022 in Iran, as they were approaching the end of a tourist visit. Iranian authorities obscured their arrests from their families and French authorities until 23 November 2022, more than six months after their arrest.

On 6 October 2022, the Islamic Republic of Iran Broadcasting (IRIB) broadcast a forced confession by Kohler in a propaganda video, interspersed with security camera footage of Kohler during her visit to Iran, in the video she confesses under duress to being an agent of the Directorate General for External Security. French authorities immediately denounce the staging of the video and deny the claims.

=== Imprisonment conditions in Iran ===
Cécile Kohler was a victim of a forced disappearance and was subjected to torture by the Iranian authorities as recognized by Amnesty International and the UN. She was subjected to solitary confinement for multiple months, a practice characterized as torture by the UN. She could not contact her family for more than seven months after her arrest. After the first contact further calls were rare, irregular, short and under high surveillance and she was forbidden from freely expressing herself on the conditions of her detention and her health. She was kept in a cell of 9 square meters with several other detainees which changed regularly. She was only allowed to leave her cell to go to the yard for thirty minutes, three times a week and slept on the floor. She didn't have an independent lawyer and had no means of contacting the embassy and could not receive mail. The French ambassador in Tehran, Nicolas Roche, was able to visit three times between 2022 and 2024.

On January 8, 2025, Nobel Peace Prize winner Narges Mohammadi expressed in an interview his concern about Kohler, believe that her detention could be fatal, as he was kept in a different section of the same prison she regularly questioned women who were transferred from Kohler's section about her condition, and they described Kohler as extremely physically weak.

The prison where Kohler and Paris were kept was bombed by Israel on 23 June 2025 during the Twelve-Day War. The bombing killed 71 people, including prisoners, visitors, prison staff and nearby residents. Iranian authorities stated that French prisoners were not killed in the attack.

=== Indictment and trial ===
On 23 March 2024 more than 100 people joined a demonstration outside Place de la Republique in support of French prisoners in Iran and demanding their release.

On 7 May 2025, gatherings too place across France organised by the Liberté pour Cécile association, and a book titled Jamais sans Cécile was published for the occasion.

On 2 July 2025, Kohler and Paris were charge on three counts: espionage for Mossad, plotting to overthrow the regime and corruption on the Earth; all three of which could result in the death penalty.

On 14 October 2025, AFP announced that Paris and Kohler had received lengthy prison sentences for espionage, Paris of 17 years and Kohler for 20.

=== Release ===
On 4 November 2025, president Emmanuel Macron announced their release from Evin prison on his X account. They were placed under house arrest in the French embassy in Tehran after spending 1277 days in prison. Iranian Foreign Minister Abbas Araghchi stated that Paris and Kohler could be released as of an exchange for the release of Mahdieh Esfandiari, an Iranian national imprisoned in France after being convicted of promoting terrorism on social media, though the French government has not confirmed the existence of the deal.

On 7 April 2026 Macron announce their release X. They left Iran in the morning by crossing the border with Azerbaijan. Their release was made possible by a moderate warming in Franco-Iranian relations, rapprochement with Azerbaijan and the mediation of Omani diplomacy. They returned to France on 8 April.
