= André Chénier =

French poet (1762–1794)

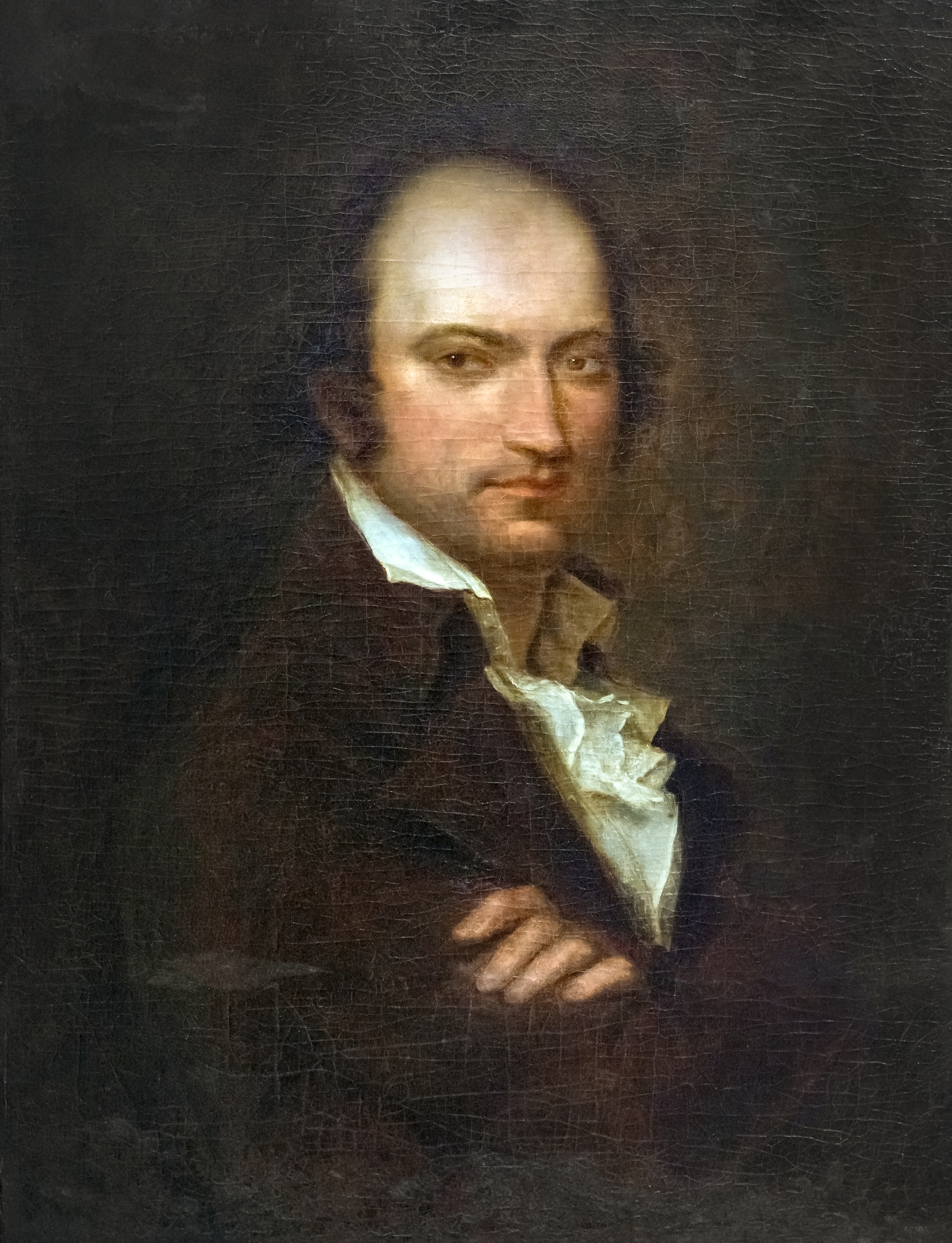
- Portrait during his last captivity by Suvée
- Born: 30 October 1762; Constantinople, Ottoman Empire
- Died: 25 July 1794 (aged 31); Paris, France
- Occupation: Writer
- Writing career
- Genre: Poetry

André Marie Chénier (French pronunciation: [ɑ̃dʁe maʁi ʃenje]; 30 October 1762 – 25 July 1794) was a French poet associated with the events of the French Revolution, during which he was sentenced to death. His sensual, emotive poetry marks him as one of the precursors of the Romantic movement. His career was brought to an abrupt end when he was guillotined for supposed "crimes against the state". Chénier's life has been the subject of Umberto Giordano's opera Andrea Chénier and other works of art.

== Life ==
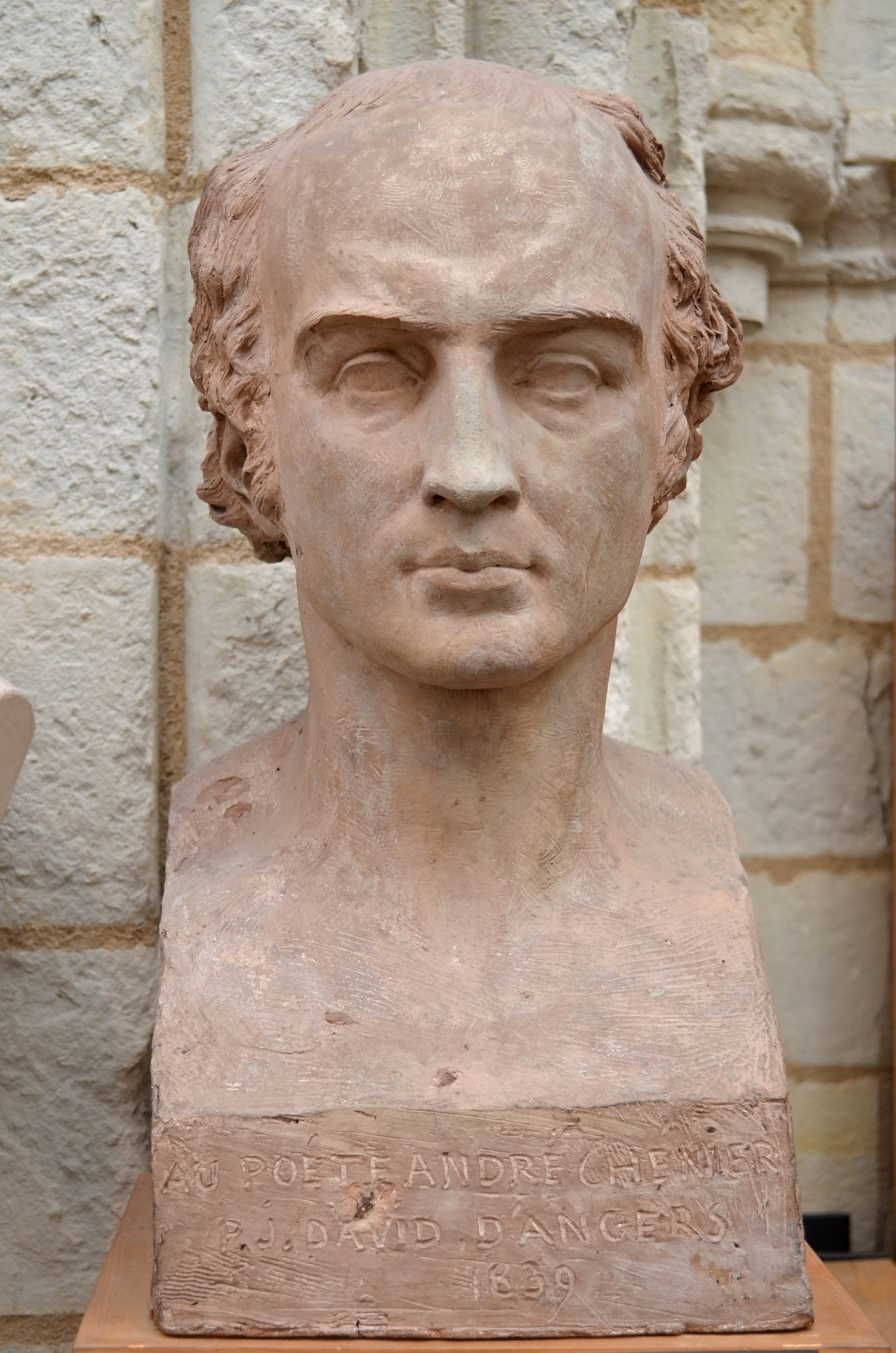
Bust of André Chénier by David d'Angers (1839).

Chénier was born in the Galata district of Constantinople. His family home, destroyed in a fire, was located on the site of the present Saint Pierre Han, in today's Karaköy neighborhood of Istanbul. His father, Louis Chénier, a native of Languedoc, after twenty years in the Levant as a cloth-merchant, was appointed to a position equivalent to that of French consul at Constantinople. His mother, Élisabeth Santi-Lomaca, whose half-sister was grandmother of Adolphe Thiers, was a Greek-speaking resident of Constantinople. On her father's side, she came from a Latin Catholic family of Chios, and on her mother's side, she may have been a descendant of Janus of Lusignan. When André was three years old, his father returned to France, and from 1768 to 1775 served as consul-general of France in Morocco. The family, of which André was the third son, and Marie-Joseph (see below) the fourth, remained in France and for a few years André was given his youthful freedom while living with an aunt in Carcassonne. A square in Carcassonne is named to commemorate him. He distinguished himself as a verse-translator from the classics at the Collège de Navarre in Paris.

In 1783, Chénier enlisted in a French regiment at Strasbourg, but the novelty soon wore off. He returned to Paris before the end of the year, was well received by his family, and mixed in the cultivated circle which frequented his mother's salon, including Lebrun-Pindare, Antoine Lavoisier, Jean François Lesueur, Claude Joseph Dorat, and, a little later, the painter Jacques-Louis David.

Chénier had already decided to become a poet, and worked in the neoclassical style of the time. He was especially inspired by a 1784 visit to Rome, Naples, and Pompeii. For nearly three years, he studied and experimented in verse without any pressure or interruption from his family. He wrote mostly idylls and bucolics, imitated to a large extent from Theocritus, Bion of Smyrna and the Greek anthologists. Among the poems written or at least sketched during this period were L'Oaristys, L'Aveugle, La Jeune Malode, Bacchus, Euphrosine and La Jeune Tarentine. He mixed classical mythology with a sense of individual emotion and spirit.

Apart from his idylls and his elegies, Chénier also experimented with didactic and philosophic verse, and when he commenced his Hermès in 1783 his ambition was to condense the Encyclopédie of Denis Diderot into a long poem somewhat after the manner of Lucretius. Now extant only in fragments, this poem was to treat of man's place in the universe, first in an isolated state, and then in society. Another fragment called "L'Invention" sums up Chénier's thoughts on poetry: "De nouvelles pensées, faisons des vers antiques" ("From new thoughts, let us make antique verses").

Chénier remained unpublished. In November 1787, an opportunity for a fresh career presented itself. The Chevalier de la Luzerne, a friend of the Chénier family, had been appointed ambassador to Britain. When he offered to take André with him as his secretary, André knew the offer was too good to refuse, but was unhappy in England. He bitterly ridiculed "... ces Anglais. Nation toute à vendre à qui peut la payer. De contrée en contrée allant au monde entier, Offrir sa joie ignoble et son faste grossier." Translation: "... these English. A nation for sale to whoever can pay for it. Going from country to country and out to the whole world, offering its ignoble joy and its coarse splendor." Although John Milton and James Thomson seem to have interested him, and a few of his verses show slight inspiration from Shakespeare and Thomas Gray, it would be an exaggeration to say Chénier studied English literature.

The events of 1789, and the startling success of his younger brother, Marie-Joseph, as political playwright and pamphleteer, concentrated all his thoughts upon France. In April 1790 he could stand London no longer, and once more joined his parents at Paris in the rue de Cléry. France was on the verge of anarchy. A monarchien believing in a constitutional monarchy for France, Chénier believed that the Revolution was already complete and that all that remained to be done was the inauguration of the reign of law. Though his political viewpoint was moderate, his tactics were dangerously aggressive: he abandoned his gentle idyls to write poetical satires. His prose "Avis au peuple français" (24 August 1790) was followed by the rhetorical "Jeu de paume", a somewhat declamatory moral ode occasioned by the Tennis court oath addressed to the radical painter Jacques-Louis David.

In the meantime Chénier orated at the Feuillants Club, and contributed frequently to the Journal de Paris from November 1791 to July 1792, when he wrote his scorching iambs to Jean Marie Collot d'Herbois, Sur les Suisses révoltés du regiment de Châteauvieux. The insurrection of 10 August 1792 uprooted his party, his paper and his friends, and he only escaped the September Massacres by staying with relatives in Normandy. In the month following these events his brother, Marie-Joseph, had entered the anti-monarchical National Convention. André raged against all these events, in such poems as Ode à Charlotte Corday congratulating France that "un scélérat de moins rampe dans cette fange", "one scoundrel less creeps in this mire". At the request of Malesherbes, the defense counsel to King Louis XVI, Chénier provided some arguments for the king's defense.

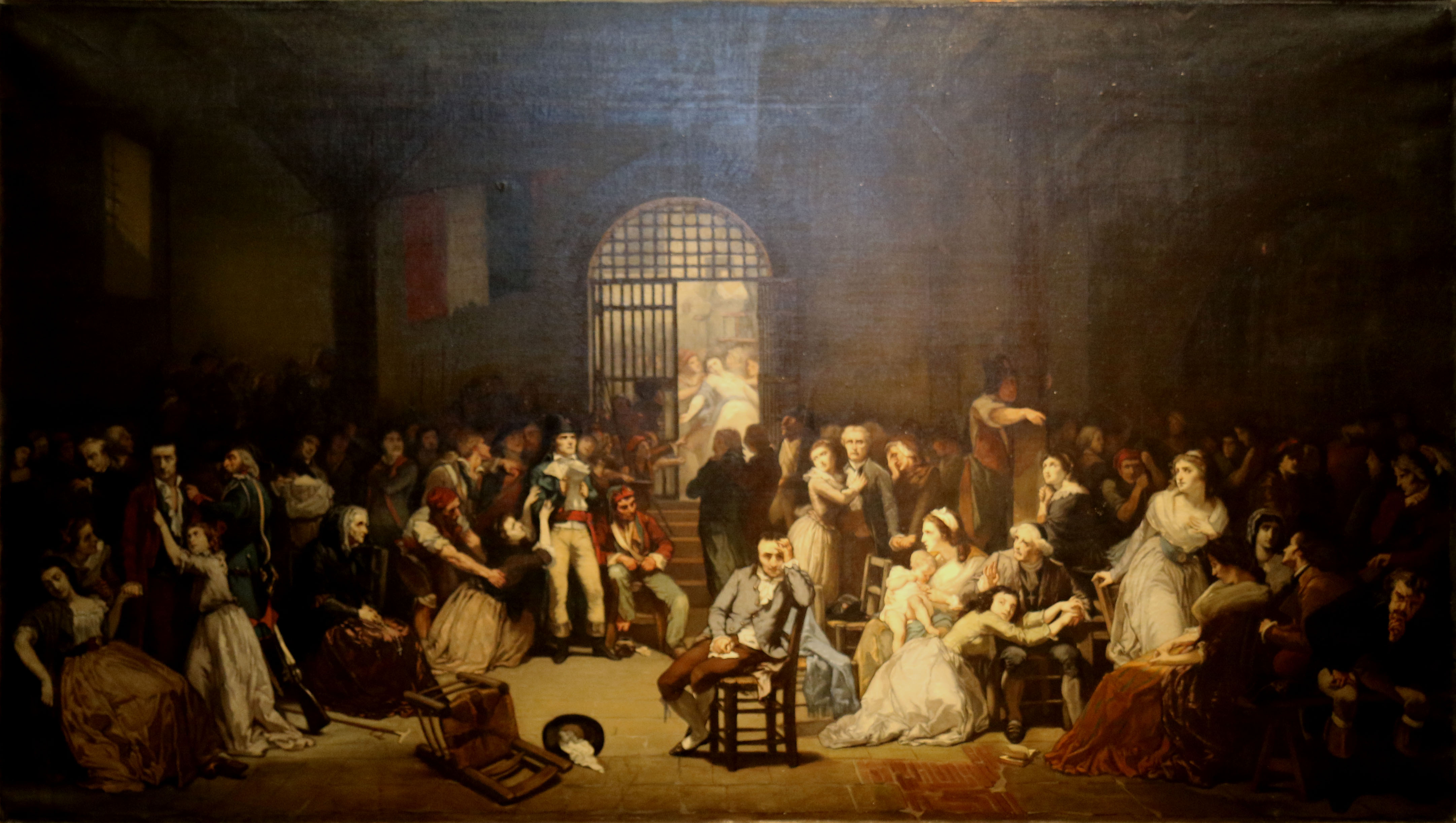
Appeal of the last victims of terror in the prison of St. Lazarus, 7, 9 Thermidor 1794. Chénier appears seated at the foreground's center. Painting by Charles Louis Müller, (Musée de la Révolution française).

After the king's execution, Chénier sought a secluded retreat on the Plateau de Satory at Versailles, and only went out after nightfall. There he wrote the poems inspired by Fanny (Mme Laurent Lecoulteux), including the exquisite Ode à Versailles. His solitary life at Versailles lasted nearly a year. On 7 March 1794 he was arrested at the house of Mme Pastoret at Passy. Two obscure agents of the Committee of Public Safety (one of them named Nicolas Guénot) were in search of a marquise who had fled, but an unknown stranger was found in the house and arrested on suspicion of being the aristocrat they were searching for. This was Chénier, who had come on a visit of sympathy.

Chénier was taken to the Luxembourg Palace and afterwards to the Prison Saint-Lazare. During the 140 days of his imprisonment he wrote a series of iambs (in alternate lines of 12 and 8 syllables) denouncing the Convention, which "hiss and stab like poisoned bullets", and which were smuggled to his family by a jailer. In prison he also composed his most famous poem, "Jeune captive", a poem at once of enchantment and of despair, inspired by the misfortunes of his fellow captive the duchesse de Fleury, née Aimée de Coigny. Ten days before Chénier's death, the painter Joseph-Benoît Suvée completed the well-known portrait of him, shown in the box above. Aimée de Coigny survived the Terror, her freedom being bought by Casimir, Comte de Montrond on the same day that she was to follow Chénier to the guillotine.

Chénier might have been overlooked but for the well-meant, indignant officiousness of his father. Marie-Joseph tried, but failed, to prevent his brother's execution. It is possible that the French government remembered Chénier as the author of the venomous verses in the Journal de Paris and had him tried by the Revolutionary Tribunal for that reason.

Chénier was convicted by the Revolutionary Tribunal. At sundown, he was taken by tumbrel to the guillotine at what is now the Place de la Nation. He was executed along with Françoise-Thérèse de Choiseul-Stainville, Princesse Joseph de Monaco, on a charge of conspiracy. Robespierre was seized by the National Convention only two days later, and executed on July 28. Chénier, aged 31 at his execution, was buried in the Cimetière de Picpus.

== Works ==
During Chénier's lifetime only his Jeu de paume (1791) and Hymne sur les Suisses (1792) had been published. For the most part, then, his reputation rests on his posthumously published work, retrieved from oblivion page by page.

The Jeune Captive appeared in the Décade philosophique, on 9 January 1795; La Jeune Tarentine in the Mercure de France of 22 March 1801. François-René de Chateaubriand quoted three or four passages in his Génie du Christianisme. Fayolle and Jules Lefèvre-Deumier also gave a few fragments; but it was not until 1819 that an attempt was made by Henri de Latouche to collect the poems in a substantive volume, from manuscripts retained by Marie-Joseph Chénier. Many more poems and fragments were discovered after Latouche's publication, and were collected in later editions. Latouche also wrote an account of Chénier's last moments.

Critical opinions of Chénier have varied wildly. He experimented with classical precedents rendered in French verse to a much greater extent than other 18th-century poets; on the other hand, the ennui and melancholy of his poetry recalls Romanticism. In 1828, Charles Augustin Sainte-Beuve praised Chénier as a heroic forerunner of the Romantic movement and a precursor of Victor Hugo. Chénier, he said, had "inspired and determined" Romanticism. Many other critics also wrote about Chénier as modern and proto-Romantic. However, Anatole France contests Sainte-Beuve's theory: he claims that Chénier's poetry is one of the last expressions of 18th-century classicism. His work should not be compared to Hugo and the Parnassien poets, but to philosophes like André Morellet. Albert Camus in 1951's The Rebel called Chenier "the only poet of the times". Paul Morillot has argued that judged by the usual test of 1820s Romanticism (love for strange literature of the North, medievalism, novelties and experiments), Chénier would have been excluded from Romantic circles.

The poet José María de Heredia held Chénier in great esteem, saying "I do not know in the French language a more exquisite fragment than the three hundred verses of the Bucoliques" and agreeing with Sainte-Beuve's judgment that Chénier was a poet ahead of his time. Chénier has been very popular in Russia, where Alexandr Pushkin wrote a poem about his last hours based on Latouche and Ivan Kozlov translated La Jeune Captive, La Jeune Tarentine and other famous pieces. Chénier has also found favor with English-speaking critics; for instance, his love of nature and of political freedom has been compared to Shelley, and his attraction to Greek art and myth recalls Keats.

Chénier's fate has become the subject of many plays, pictures and poems, notably in the opera Andrea Chénier by Umberto Giordano, the epilogue by Sully-Prudhomme, the Stello by Alfred de Vigny, a poem by Pushkin, the delicate statue by Denys Puech in the Luxembourg, and the well-known portrait in the centre of Charles Louis Müller's Last Days of the Terror.

== See also ==
- 1793 Chénier Act on "right of the author" (French alternative concept to copyright)

== Legacy ==
- The following cities have streets named rue André Chénier: Aix-en-Provence, Amiens, Béziers, Houilles, Issy-les-Moulineaux, Lyon, Narbonne, Reims, Saint-Gilles, Saint-Martin-d'Hères, Saint-Nazaire, Toulon;
