= Carrières-sur-Seine =

- Commune
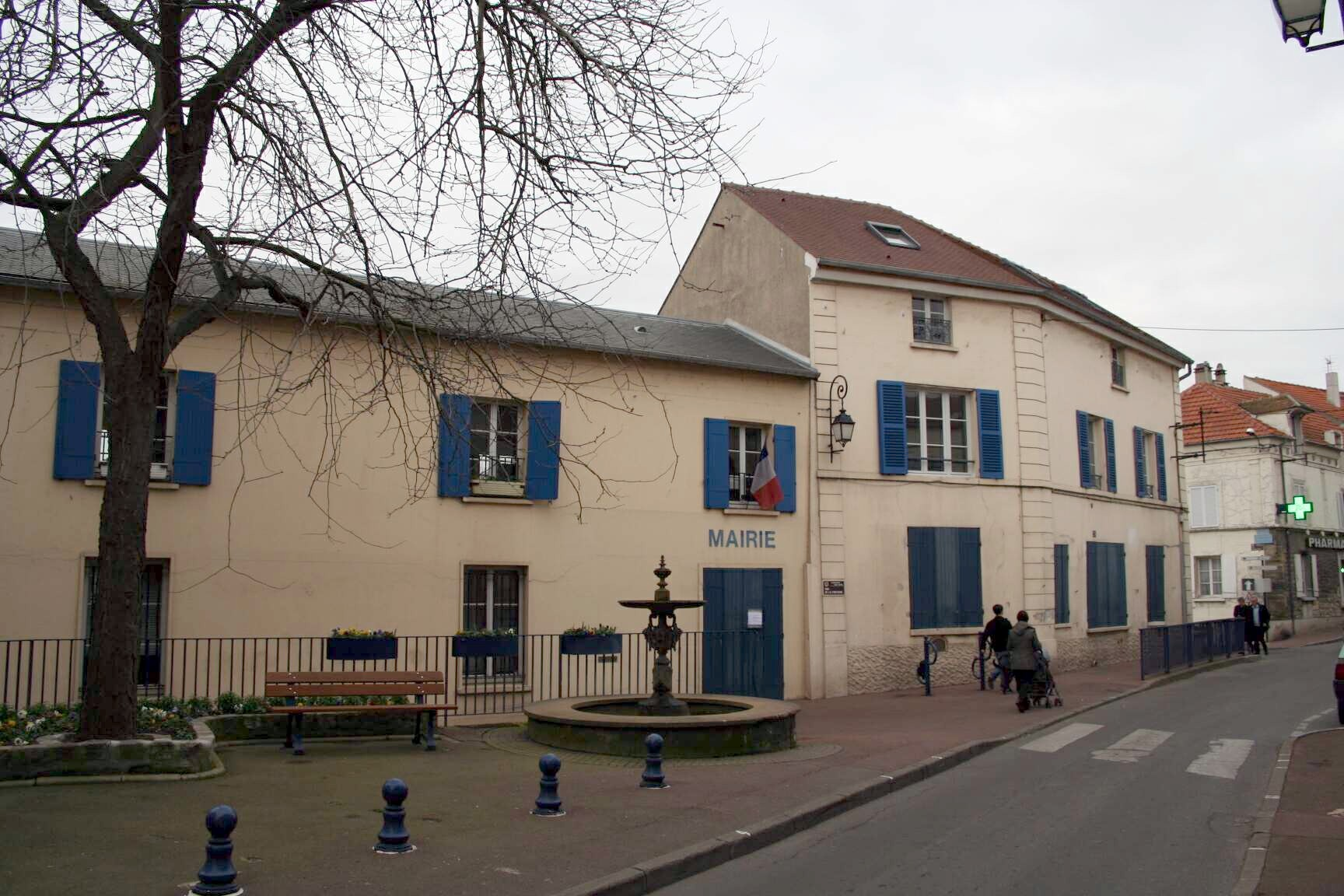
- Town hall

- Coat of arms
- Location of Carrières-sur-Seine
- Location within France Location within Île-de-France (region)
- Coordinates: 48°54′32″N 2°10′44″E
- Country: France
- Region: Île-de-France
- Department: Yvelines
- Arrondissement: Saint-Germain-en-Laye
- Canton: Houilles
- Intercommunality: CA Saint Germain Boucles Seine

Government
  - Mayor (2020–2026): Arnaud de Bourrousse
- Area^{1}: 5.02 km^{2} (1.94 sq mi)
- Elevation: 52 m (171 ft)
- Highest elevation: 58 m (190 ft)
- Lowest elevation: 23 m (75 ft)
- Population (2023): 14,791
  - Density: 2,950/km^{2} (7,630/sq mi)
- Time zone: UTC+01:00 (CET)
  - Summer (DST): UTC+02:00 (CEST)
- INSEE/Postal code: 78124 /78420
- ^{1} French Land Register data, which excludes lakes, ponds, glaciers > 1 km^{2} (0.386 sq mi or 247 acres) and river estuaries.

Carrières-sur-Seine (French: [kaʁjɛʁ syʁ sɛn]) is a commune in the Yvelines department in the Île-de-France region in north-central France.

The inhabitants of the town of Carrières-sur-Seine are called Carrillons (masculine plural) or Carrillonnes (feminine plural) in French, not to confuse with "carillon(ne)s" which would translate into "Chimes" and "Ringing," respectively.

== Population ==
Historical population
| Year | Pop. | ±% p.a. |
|---|---|---|
| 1968 | 11,713 | — |
| 1975 | 11,733 | +0.02% |
| 1982 | 11,399 | −0.41% |
| 1990 | 11,469 | +0.08% |
| 1999 | 12,050 | +0.55% |
| 2007 | 15,651 | +3.32% |
| 2012 | 15,087 | −0.73% |
| 2017 | 14,967 | −0.16% |
| 2023 | 14,791 | −0.20% |
Source: INSEE

== Education ==
Preschool and elementary schools (each group has one preschool and one elementary school):

- Groupe Maurice Berteaux
- Groupe Alouettes / Prévert (Maternelle des Alouettes and Elémentaire J. Prévert)
- Groupe Victor Hugo / Parc (Maternelle Victor Hugo and Elémentaire du Parc)
- Groupe Plants de Catelaine

Secondary schools in Carrières-sur-Seine:

- Collège Les Amandiers
- Lycée Les Pierres Vives

Secondary schools in nearby municipalities:

- Collège Lamartine (Houilles)
- Lycée Evariste Galois (Sartrouville)
- Lycée Jules Verne (Sartrouville)
- The British School of Paris (Croissy Sur Seine)

== See also ==
- Communes of the Yvelines department
