= Idyll XXVII =

Greek poem attributed to Theocritus

Idyll XXVII, also titled Οαριστύς ('The Lovers' Talk'), is a bucolic poem traditionally attributed to the 3rd-century BC Greek poet Theocritus, but probably by a later imitator. The poem tells how the cowherd Daphnis woos a country lass (probably called Αcrotime). She is initially coy and dismissive but eventually yields to his advances and is deflowered. The opening lines of the poem are lost.

== Analysis ==
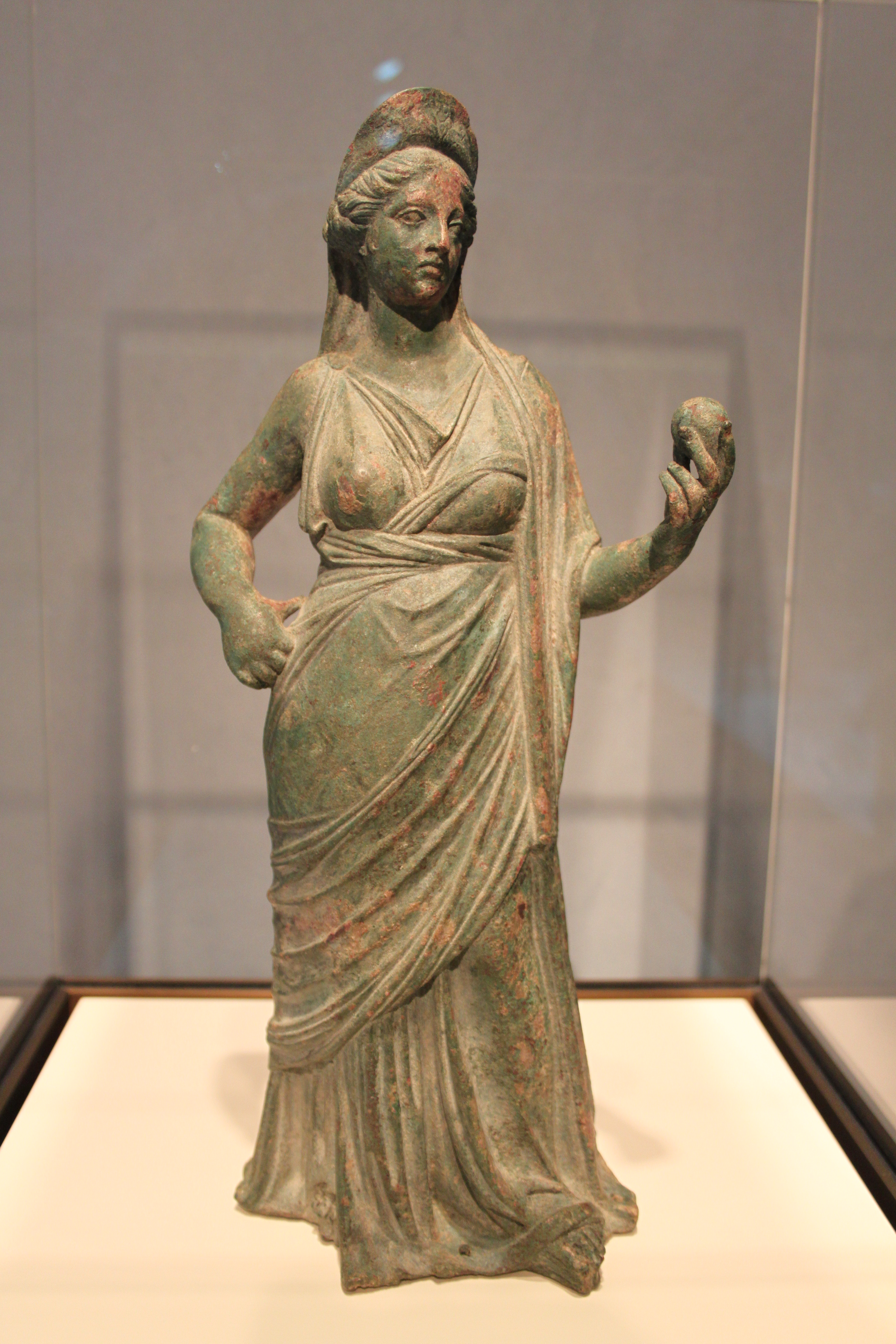
Statuette of Aphrodite with an apple (Getty Villa). Cf. μᾶλα τεὰ πράτιστα τάδε χνοάοντα διδάξω "I’ll teach my first lesson to these downy apples of yours" (50)

Edmonds thinks this Idyll in its complete form was a match between a shepherd and another whom he had challenged, the stake being the shepherd's pipe. The missing part comprised the lines introducing the match, the whole of the rival's piece, and the prelude to the shepherd's piece. What is left is the main part of the shepherd's piece, its epilogue, and the award of the umpire. The umpire returns the shepherd his pipe, and adds a compliment in the form of a request that now he will play him another of his tunes, as, not having lost his pipe in the match, he will still be able to do.

In the dialogue supposed to be recited, or perhaps to be sung, by the shepherd, one speaker answers the other speaker line for line except in two places where the same speaker has two lines. These exceptions, necessary in order to shift the rôle of answerer, have brought about a wrong arrangement of lines 9 and 19 in the manuscripts.

== Authorship ==
The authenticity of this Idyll has been denied, partly because the Daphnis of the poem is not identical in character with the Daphnis of the first Idyll. The poem may be ascribed to an imitator of Theocritus. Line 4 he has taken bodily from him.

== Translations ==
A French verse translation by André Chénier (L'Oaristys) takes several liberties with the Greek text.

== Illustrations ==
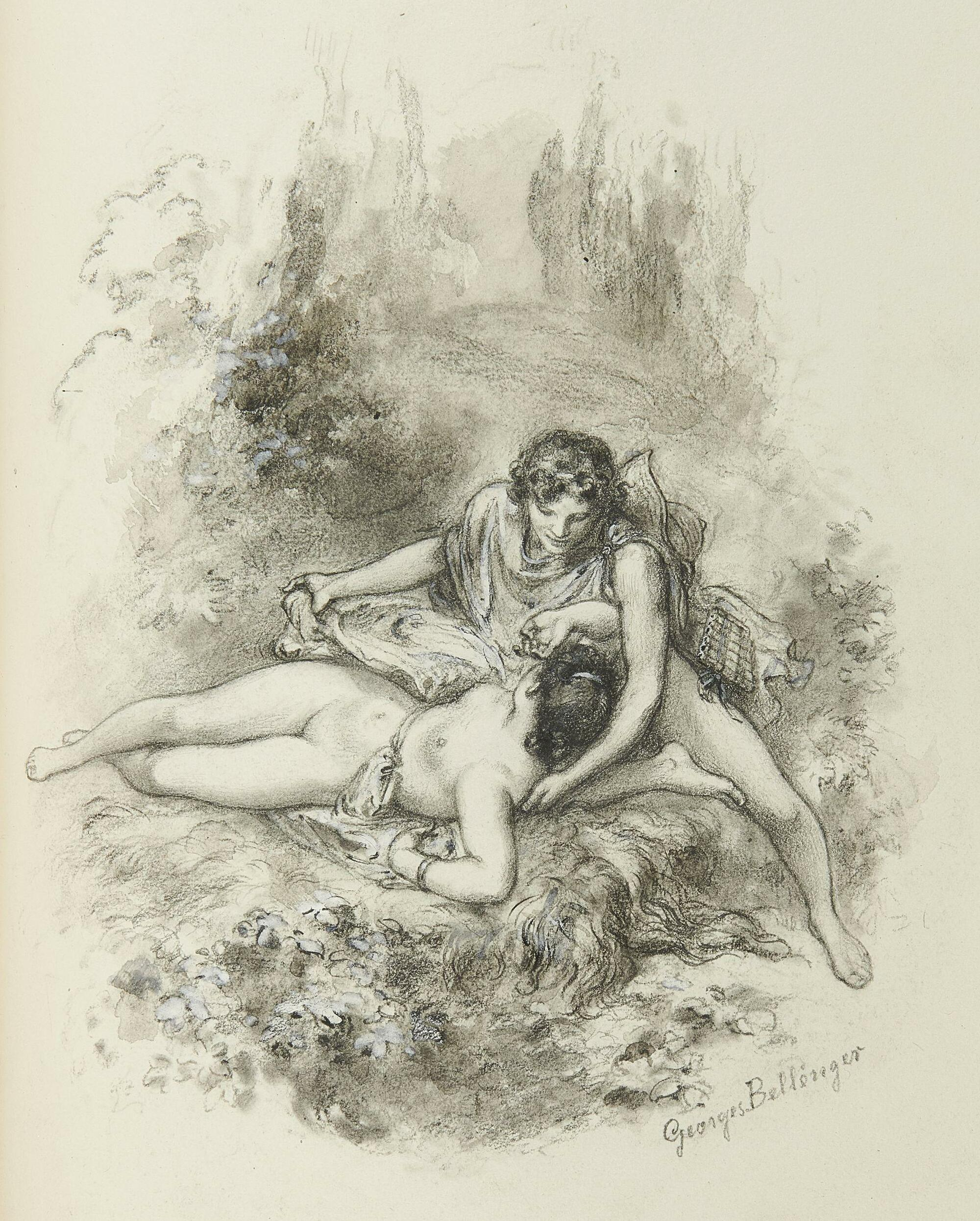

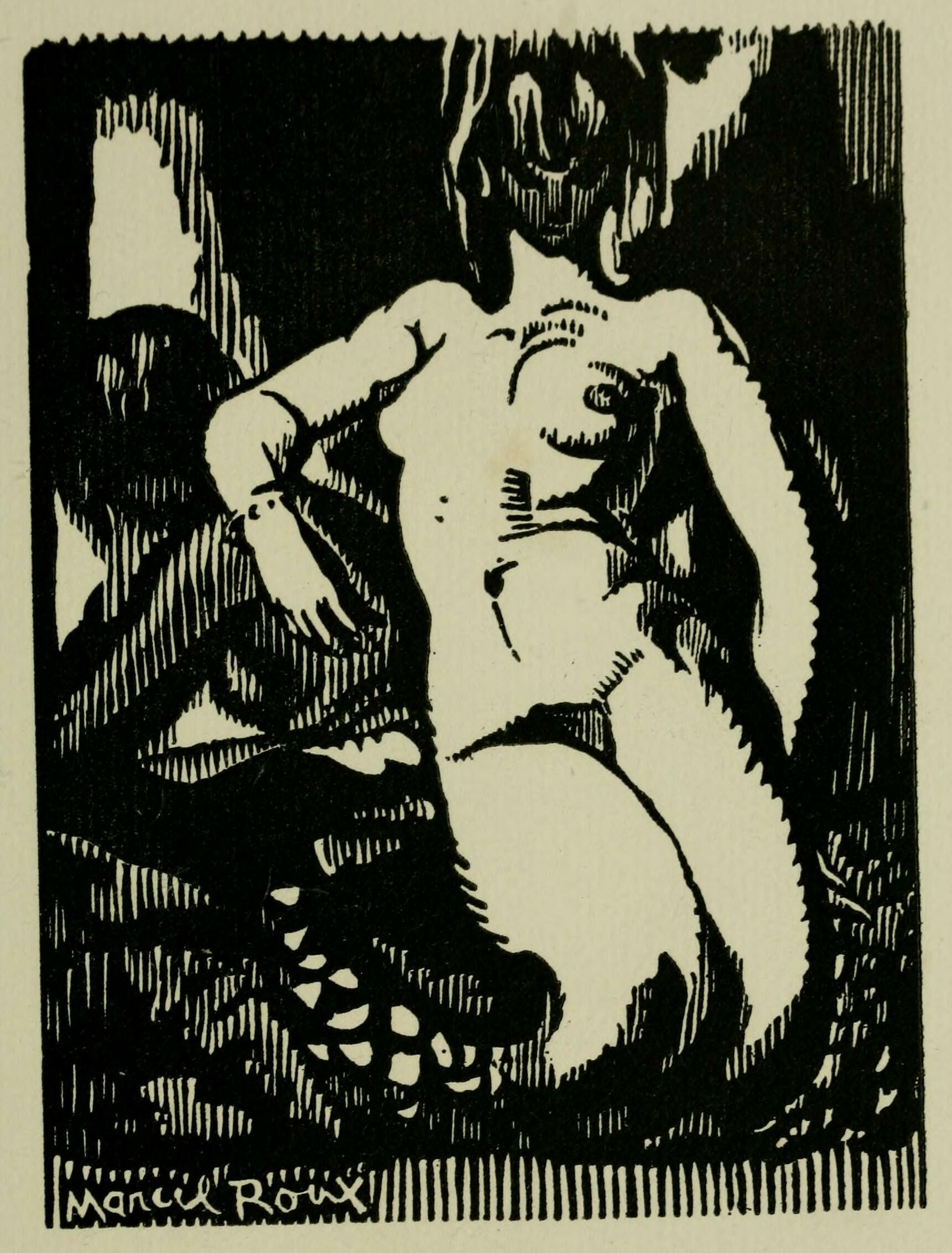

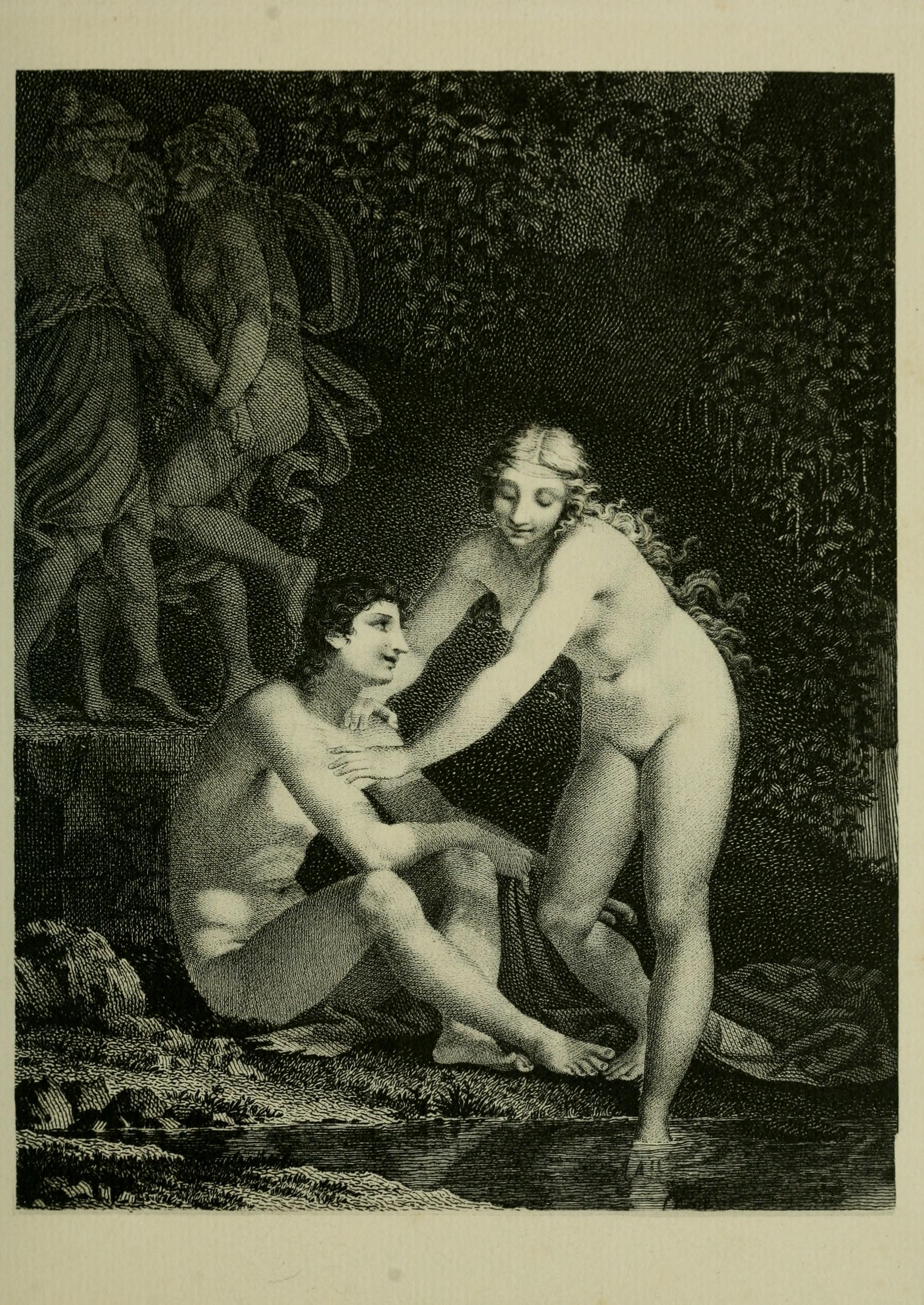

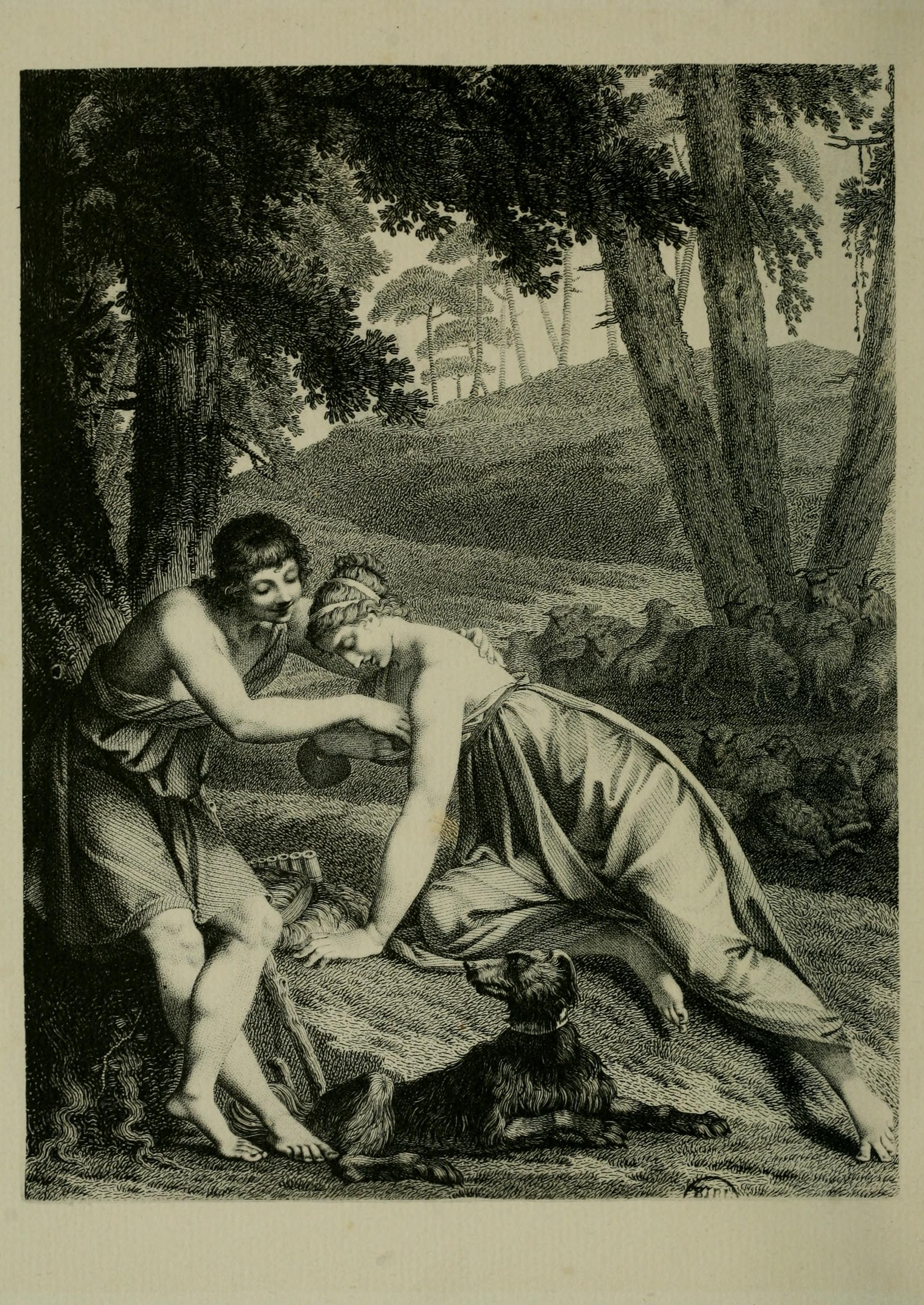

== Bibliography ==
- Cairns, Francis (2010). "The Genre 'Oaristys'". Wiener Studien. 123: 101–29.
- Cholmeley, R. J., ed. (1919). The Idylls of Theocritus (2nd ed.). London: G. Bell & Sons, Ltd. pp. 364–5.
- Giangrande, Giusseppe (1972). "The Neatherd's Progress in 'Theocritus'". The Journal of Hellenic Studies. 92: 177–8.
- Gow, A. S. F., ed. (1950). Theocritus. Vol. 1. Cambridge: Cambridge University Press. pp. 218–25.
- Gow, A. S. F., ed. (1950). Theocritus. Vol. 2. Cambridge: Cambridge University Press. pp. 485–94.
- Hopkinson, Neil, ed. (2015). Theocritus. Moschus. Bion. LCL 28. Harvard, MA: Harvard University Press. pp. 373–87.
- Kirstein, Robert (2007). Junge Hirten und alte Fischer: Die Gedichte 27, 20 und 21 des Corpus Theocriteum. Texte und Kommentare 29. Berlin, Boston: De Gruyter. pp. 33–87.
- Kyriakou, Poulheria (2021). "27. The Early Reception of Theocritus". Brill's Companion to Theocritus. Leiden: Brill. pp. 651–78.
- Licht, Hans (1932). Sexual Life in Ancient Greece. London: George Routledge & Sons, Ltd. p. 271.
- Mantey, Anna; Portalier, Fanny; Labourier, Laurine (8 May 2020) [7 May 2020]. "Retour sur "l'Affaire Chénier"". Master Genre, littératures, cultures. Université Lyon 2 – Master études sur le genre. Hypotheses.
- Sider, David (2001). "Theokritos 27: Oaristys". Würzburger Jahrbücher. 25: 99–105.
- Wasdin, Katherine (2018). "7. Persuasive Violence". Eros at Dusk: Ancient Wedding and Love Poetry. New York, NY: Oxford University Press. pp. 195–226.

Attribution:

- Edmonds, J. M., ed. (1919). The Greek Bucolic Poets (3rd ed.). William Heinemann. pp. 331–45.
- Lang, Andrew, ed. (1880). Theocritus, Bion, and Moschus. London: Macmillan and Co. pp. 138–45.
