= Jules Lefèvre-Deumier =

French author and poet

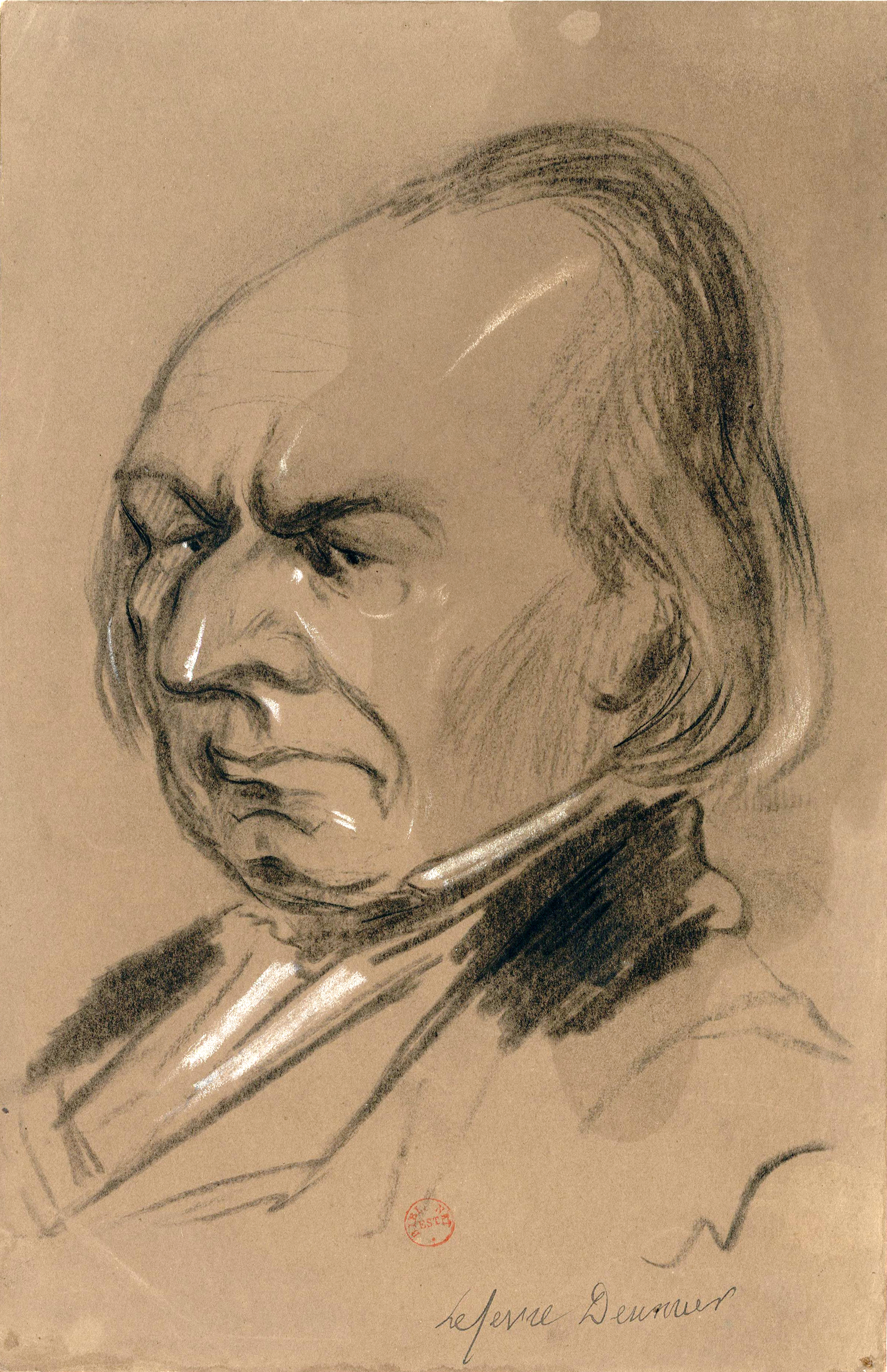
Jules Lefèvre-Deumier (1797–1857), French author and poet.

Jules Lefèvre-Deumier (14 June 1797 – 11 December 1857) was a French writer and poet.

He was deeply influenced by romanticism; His models were André Chénier and Lord Byron. Learning in March 1823 of Byron's involvement in the Greek War of Independence, he tried to join him but was delayed in Italy after a shipwreck. He was still in Venice when he learned that his hero had died and Ipsara Island had been captured by the Turks. In 1831, he went to Warsaw to help the Polish insurgents and was appointed aide-de-camp to General Henryk Dembiński. He was wounded and taken prisoner by the Austrians.

His father, a civil servant for the Ministry of Finance, was a fierce opponent of Romanticism; which he ridiculed through poems and parodies. This made Lefèvre's relationship with his father all the more difficult. The title of one of his early poems, Le Parricide (1819), bears testimony to their tense relationship. From a very young age he was greatly admired by the new generation, including Alexandre Soumet and Victor Hugo, who may have drawn inspiration from Lefèvre's poem Méditation d’un proscrit sur la peine de mort (Meditation of an outcast on death penalty) for his own Dernier Jour d’un condamné (Last Day of a man sentenced to death).

He was strongly opposed to the death penalty and his poem, Méditation d’un proscrit sur la peine de mort, is one of the first French poetic texts to advocate its abolition.

Towards the end of his life he was among the first to experiment with prose poetry in his Livre du Promeneur (Hiker's book). He gave his support to Napoleon III, who subsequently appointed him librarian of the Elysée and later of the Tuileries.

His given name was Lefèvre, to which he later added Deumier in honor of an aunt who had bequeathed him her considerable fortune. In February 1836 he married sculptor and writer Marie-Louise-Roulleaux Dugage, with whom he had two sons, Maxime (born 1837) and Lazare Eusèbe (born 1841).

== Publications ==
- Le Parricide, poème, suivi d’autres poésies (1823. English: The Parricide, and other poems)
- Le Clocher de Saint-Marc, poème, suivi d’une ode sur la mort de Bonaparte, et de divers fragments (1825)
- Les Pélerinages d’un Childe Harold Parisien, published under the pseudonym D. J. C. Verfèle (Paris, 1825)
- Dialogue des vivants (1828) Texte en ligne
- Confidences (1833)
- Sir Lionel d’Arquenay (1834)
- La Résurrection de Versailles, poème lyrique (1837)
- Les Martyrs d’Arezzo (1839)
- Œuvres d’un désœuvré. Les Vespres de l’abbaye Du Val (1842)
- Les Vespres de l’Abbaye du Val (1842)
- Poésies par Jules Le Fèvre-Deumier. La Crédence : l’Herbier; les Confidences (1844)
- Le Livre du promeneur, ou les Mois et les jours (1854)
- Études biographiques et littéraires sur quelques célébrités étrangères, par J. Le Fèvre-Deumier. Le cavalier Marino, Anne Radcliffe, Paracelse, Jérôme Vida (1854)
- La Pâque fleurie de 1856, poëme lyrique (1856) Texte en ligne
- Célébrités d’autrefois, essais biographiques et littéraires (1856)
- Vittoria Colonna (1856)
- Le Couvre-feu, dernières poésies (1857)
- Célébrités françaises, essais biographiques et littéraires, par Jules Le Fèvre-Deumier. Rabelais, Montchrestien, Chapelain, Brébeuf, Scarron, l’abbé Cotin, La Motte-Houdard, Marivaux, Bernis, Thomas, Rulhière, Rivarol, Bailly, l’abbé Maury, Joséphine de Beauharnais, Delatouche, Soumet (1889)
- Entretiens sur l’immortalité de l’âme (1892)
- Leçons de littérature allemande: morceaux choisis des poètes et des prosateurs classés par genres, avec une table des pièces et des auteurs; ouvrage précédé d’un coup d’œil sur la littérature allemande, depuis Luther jusqu’à nos jours (1893)
- Célébrités allemandes, essais bibliographiques et littéraires (1894)
- Célébrités italiennes: Vittoria Colonna, Jérôme Vida, Ugo Foscolo, Torquato Tasso (1894)
- Célébrités anglaises, essais et études biographiques et littéraires: James Thomson, Anne Radcliffe, George Psalmanazar, Elisabeth Landon, Christopher North (1895)
- Critique littéraire (1825-1845) (1896)
- Études politiques (1897)
