= Institut Notre-Dame (Yvelines) =

Institut Notre-Dame, called IND is a private school network in the Yvelines department of France, in the Paris metropolitan area. It has three schools which are based in St-Germain-en-Laye and Sartrouville.

== History ==
It originated as the Institut national de St-Germain-en-Laye, which first opened in 1795. The current iteration, as the Institut Note-Dame, first opened in 1948.

This network is representing by three schools :
- Primaire Notre-Dame in St-Germain-en-Laye (Maternelle/Primaire)
- Secondaire Notre-Dame in St-Germain-en-Laye (Collège/Lycée)
- Lycée Jean-Paul II in Sartrouville
