= Hôtel de Ville, Houilles =

Town hall in Houilles, France

Hôtel de Ville
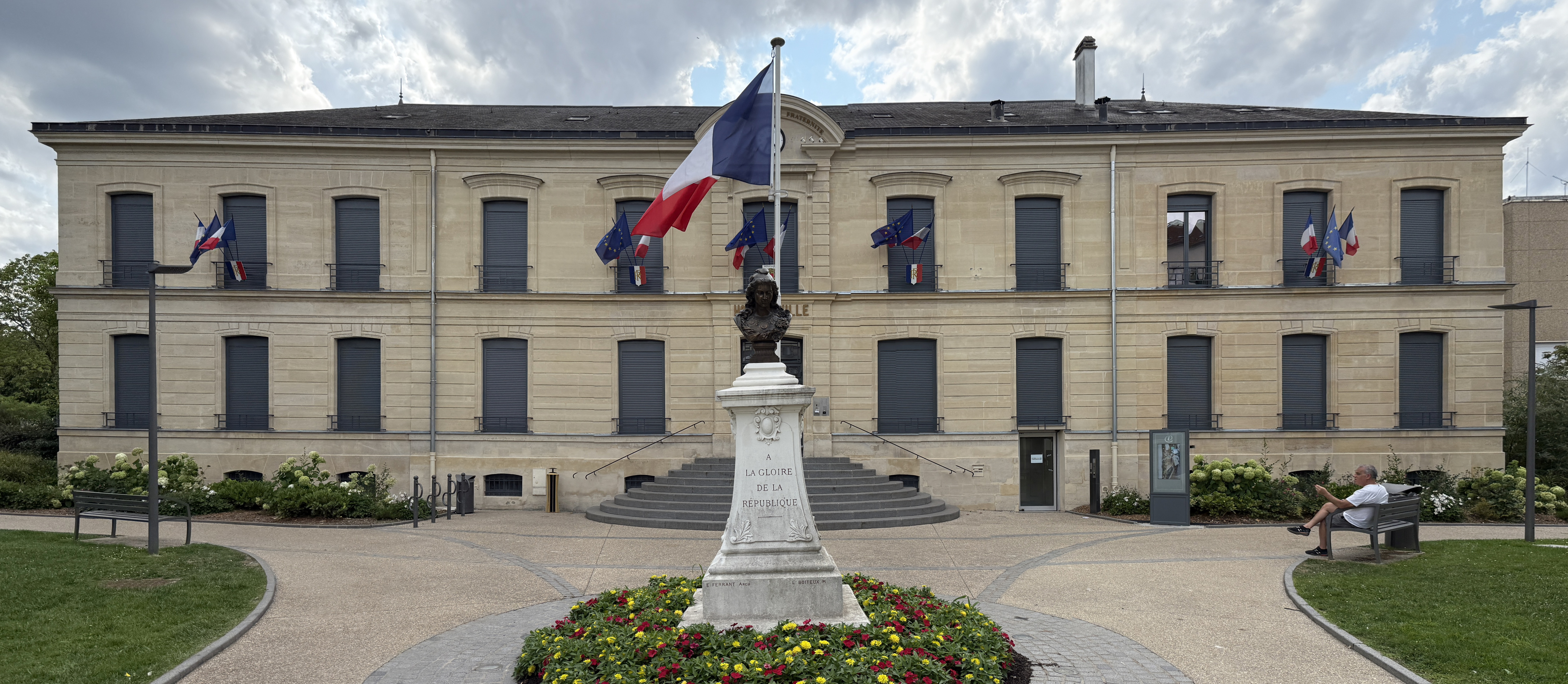
- The main frontage of the Hôtel de Ville in July 2025
- Interactive map of the Hôtel de Ville area

General information
- Type: City hall
- Architectural style: Neoclassical style
- Location: Houilles, France
- Coordinates: 48.9232°N 2.1865°E
- Completed: 1905

The Hôtel de Ville (French pronunciation: [otɛl də vil], City Hall) is a municipal building in Houilles, Yvelines, in the northwestern suburbs of Paris, standing on Rue Gambetta.

== History ==
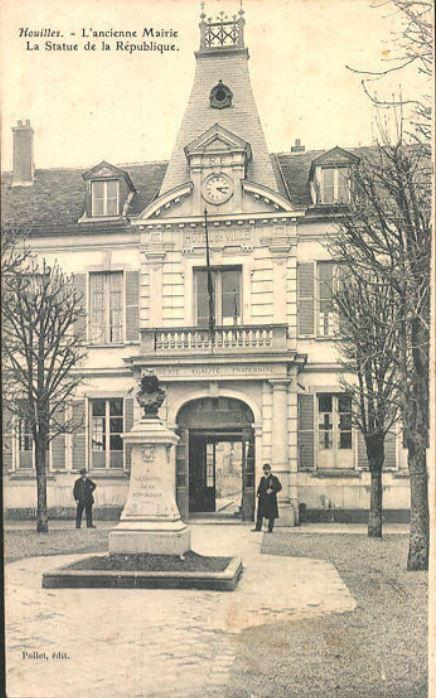
The old town hall

Following the French Revolution, the town council initially met in the house of the mayor at that time. This arrangement continued until 1872, when the council led by the mayor, Louis Benjamin Dumont, decided to acquire a property for use as a combined town hall and school. The property they selected, on Rue de Paris, belonged to the Verdier family. After the necessary conversion works were completed, the new municipal building opened in 1874.

The design involved a symmetrical main frontage of seven bays facing onto the street. The central bay featured a porch formed by a segmental headed opening with a moulded surround and a keystone flanked by a pair of Doric order columns supporting an entablature. On the first floor, there was a French door and a balustraded balcony flanked by a pair of Doric order pilasters supporting an entablature and an open pediment. The pediment contained a clock flanked by pilasters supporting a smaller triangular pediment and, behind the clock, there was a steep châteauesque-style roof. The other bays were fenestrated by casement windows on two floors and by dormer windows at attic level. The building continued to serve as a school, even after it was no longer required for municipal use, until it was demolished in 1943.

In the early 20th century, following significant population growth, the council led by the mayor, Jacques Kieffer, decided to acquire a more substantial building. The property they selected was on Rue Gambetta. The building was commissioned as a private house in the late 18th century. It was acquired for Fanny Antoinette Everard on her marriage to Paul Joseph Alexis Domère in 1836. It then remained in the Domère family until it was acquired by the council in 1905. The original design involved a frontage of just five bays facing onto Rue Gambetta. The central bay featured a short flight of steps leading up to segmental headed doorway on the ground floor and there was a segmental headed window on the first floor. The central bay was flanked by full-height pilasters supporting a cornice and a segmental pediment with a clock in the tympanum. The other bays were fenestrated by casement windows on both floors. Internally, the principal room was the Salle du Conseil (council chamber).

A bust of Marianne, which had been created by the sculptor, Paul Lecreux, and had stood in front of the old town hall, was relocated to area in front of the new town hall in 1903. The new town hall benefited from a large garden featuring a prominent Ginkgo biloba tree. In 1934, a bandstand was erected in the garden and, after the Second World War, the garden was renamed Charles de Gaulle Park.

The building was extended with wings of three bays each at either end in the 1950s. A major programme of landscaping works, carried out at a cost of €1,050,000, was completed in April 2014.
