= Frédéric Machado =

French footballer (born 1975)

Personal information
- Full name: Frédéric Machado
- Date of birth: 11 November 1975 (age 50)
- Place of birth: Sartrouville, France
- Height: 1.74 m (5 ft 8 1/2 in)
- Position: Striker

Team information
- Current team: Gap FC

Senior career*
Years	Team	Apps	(Gls)
1995–1999	Lille	34	(5)
1998	→ SC Lourinhanense (loan)	0	(0)
1998–1999	→ ASOA Valence (loan)	27	(2)
1999–2001	AS Beauvais	26	(5)
2001–2004	Besançon RC	85	(18)
2004–	Gap FC	163	(42)
- * Club domestic league appearances and goals as of 19:15, 14 June 2010 (UTC)

Frédéric Machado (born 11 November 1975) is a French professional football player. He played in the Championnat de France amateur for Gap FC from 2004 until 2010.

He played on the professional level in Ligue 1 for Lille OSC and in Ligue 2 for Lille OSC, ASOA Valence, AS Beauvais Oise and Besançon RC.
