= Hôtel de Ville, Sartrouville =

Town hall in Sartrouville, France

Hôtel de Ville
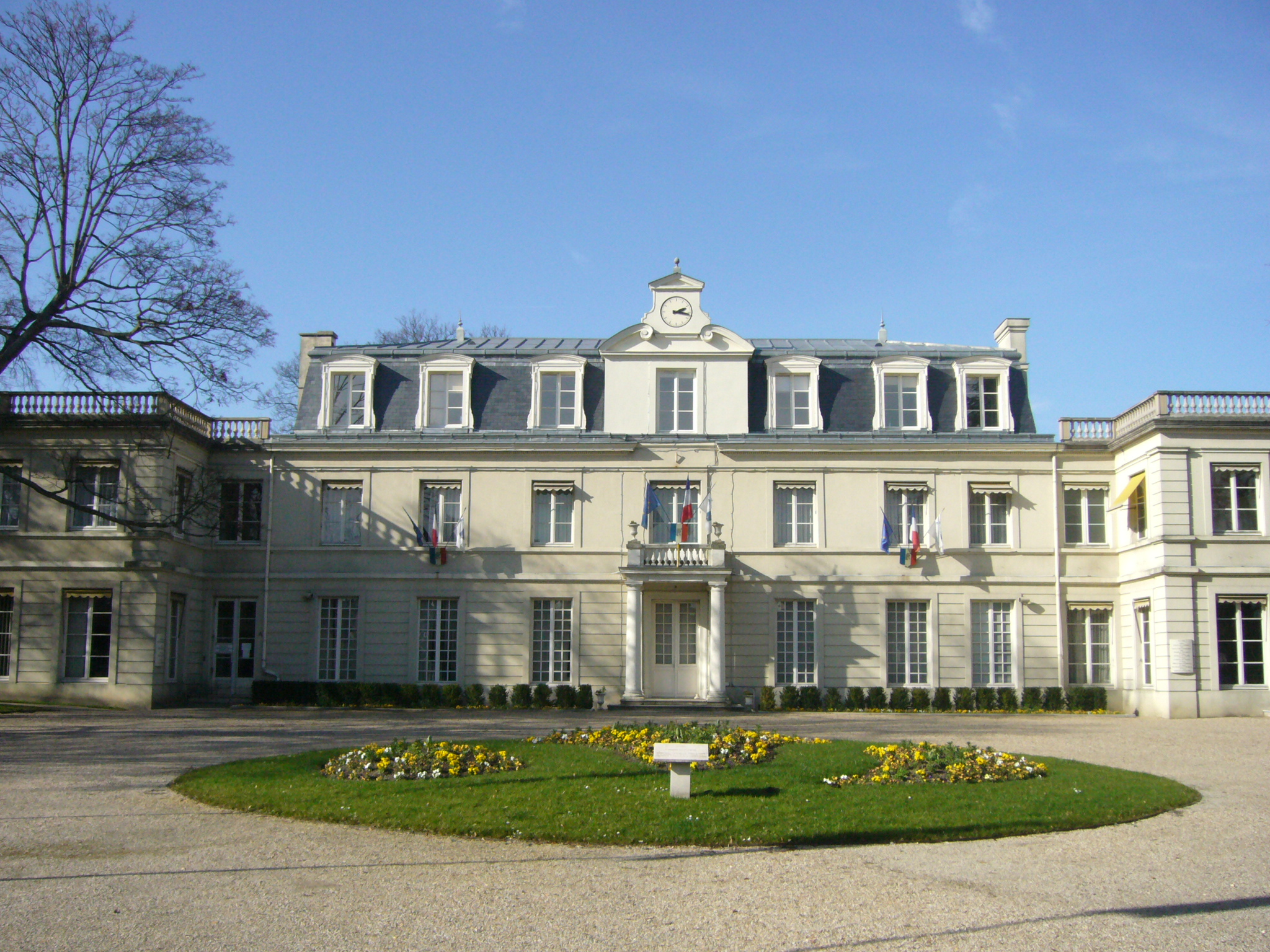
- The main frontage of the Hôtel de Ville in February 2007
- Interactive map of the Hôtel de Ville area

General information
- Type: City hall
- Architectural style: Neoclassical style
- Location: Sartrouville, France
- Coordinates: 48.9411°N 2.1583°E
- Completed: 1924 (reconstruction)

The Hôtel de Ville (French pronunciation: [otɛl də vil], City Hall) is a municipal building in Sartrouville, Yvelines, to the northwest of Paris, France, standing on Rue Buffon.

== History ==
After the French Revolution, meetings of the town council were initially held in the Church of Saint Martin. After finding this arrangement inadequate, the town established its first town hall in a room which formed part of an outbuilding to the west of the church.

After their original home became dilapidated, the town council relocated to its second town hall, a house on the corner of Rue de l'Eglise and Rue de Pontoise (now Rue Martial Déchard) in 1864. This was a simple structure with a post office on the ground floor and an assembly room on the first floor.

Following significant population growth, the town council relocated to its third town hall, a country house which had belonged to the Turgot family, on what is now Rue de Stalingrad. Michel-Étienne Turgot became master of the merchants of Paris, a precursor to the role of mayor of Paris, in 1729 and went to become President of the Grand Conseil of France in 1741. It was around that time he commissioned the house, which was a typical hôtel particulier with a grand gate, a grand courtyard and two ornate façades. Michel-Étienne Turgot sold the building shortly before the birth of his son, Anne Robert Jacques Turgot, who was Finance Minister of France from 1774 to 1776. The town council acquired the building in 1880. It was downgraded to the status of a municipal annexe in 1924, and was destroyed by allied bombing on 24 June 1944, during the Second World War.

By the 1920s, the third town hall was considered too cramped, and the town council decided to acquire a new building. The building it selected was the Château de la Vaudoire, which dated from the 13th century. Owners of the building included Hutin d'Aulnoy, who was secretary to Charles VI and bought the château in around 1367. They also included Léon Fontaine, who was a friend of the author, Guy de Maupassant, and who bought the château in 1867. After Léon's death, it passed to his daughter, Elisabeth Thérèse Fontaine, in 1892. She married Louis Stanislas Alfred Foulon, who became mayor of the town in 1892. After Elisabeth died in 1922, it was marketed for sale but it was in such a dilapidated state that nobody wanted the buy it. Another former mayor, Paul Guériot, persuaded the family to donate the building to the town. After completion of an extensive programme of reconstruction, it was officially reopened as the fourth town hall on 18 November 1924.

The design involved a symmetrical main frontage of seven bays facing onto Rue Buffon. The central bay featured a porch formed by two Doric order columns supporting an entablature and a balcony. There was a French door on the first floor and casement window at attic level. The central bay was surmounted by an open segmental pediment and, above it, a clock. The other bays were fenestrated by casement windows on the first two floors and by dormer windows at attic level. Pavilions were subsequently added at both ends. Internally, the principal room was the Salle du Conseil (council chamber).

In September 1942, during the Second World War, three members of the Francs-Tireurs et Partisans attacked the town hall and stole 2,500 sheets of food stamps, which were then used to support the activities of the French Resistance. The local chief police commissioner, Augustin Orsi, was arrested by German officers at his office in the town hall, for activities in support of the French Resistance, on 19 February 1944. He was subsequently horribly tortured, and then transported to Mauthausen concentration camp, where he was forced to work as slave labour until his death.

One wing of the town hall was badly damaged by allied bombing on 28 May 1944; this was three months before the town was liberated by American troops on 26 August 1944. A major refurbishment programme was carried out on the building between 1975 and 1976.
