= Charles Louis Müller =

French painter

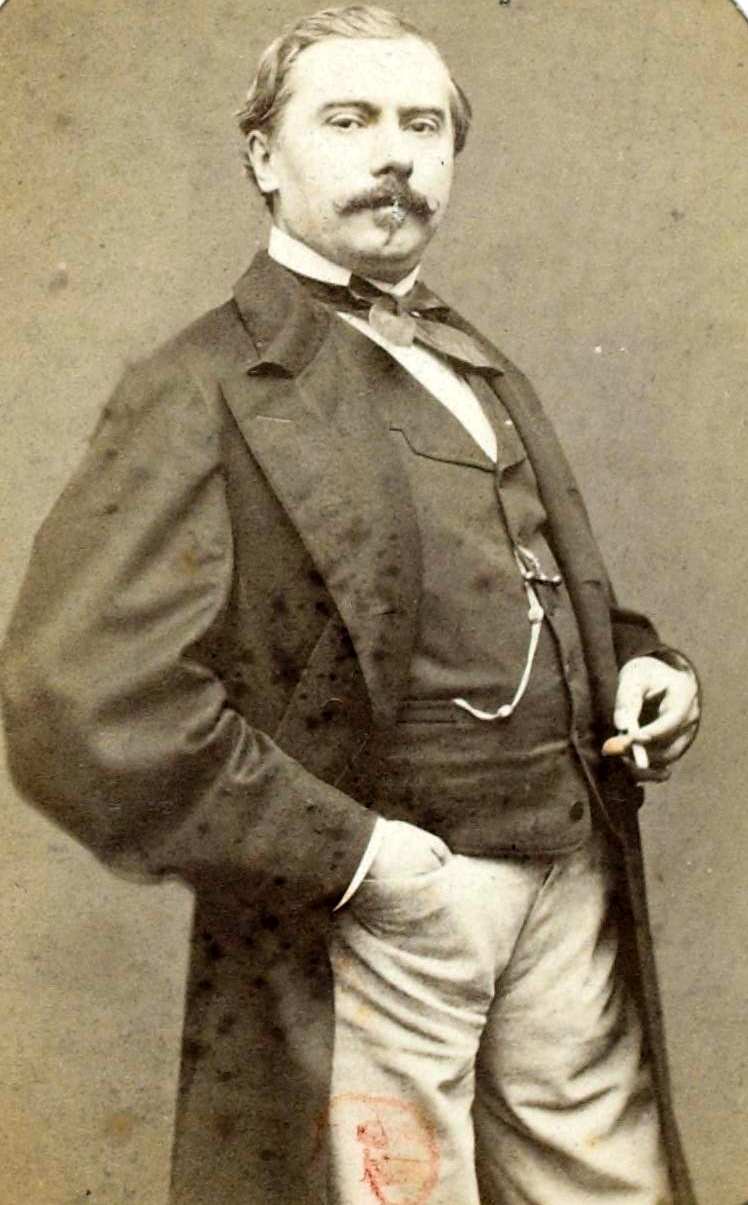
- Charles Müller by Étienne Carjat (between 1865 and 1870), Paris, BnF
- Born: 28 December 1815; Paris
- Died: 9 January 1892 (aged 76); 8th arrondissement of Paris
- Occupation: Painter
- Awards: Officer of the Legion of Honor (1859)

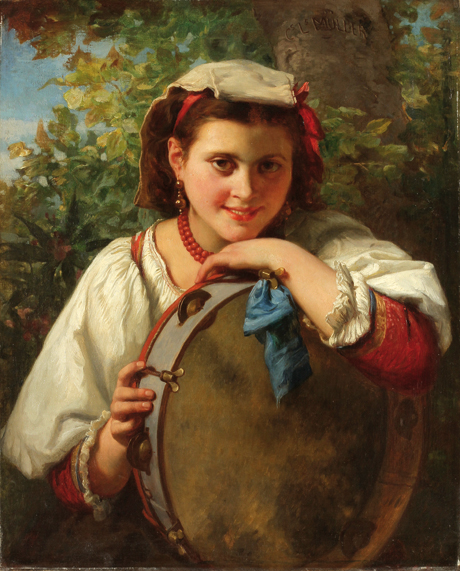
Young Lady with Tambourine (by 1892)

Charles Louis Müller (Paris 22 December 1815 – 10 January 1892 Paris), also known as Müller de Paris, was a French painter.

== Biography ==
He was the pupil of Léon Cogniet, Baron Gros and others in the École des Beaux-Arts. In 1837 he exhibited his first picture, Christmas Morning. From 1850 to 1853 he directed the manufactory of Gobelin tapestries. In 1864 he became a member of the Académie des Beaux-Arts of the Institut de France, succeeding Jean-Hippolyte Flandrin.

== Works ==
He was a fecund producer of historic pictures and portraits. Among his works are Heliogabalus (1841), Primavera (1846), Haydée (1848), Lady Macbeth, and his masterpiece, Calling Out the Last Victims of the Reign of Terror at the Prison of Saint-Lazare (Appel des dernières victimes de la Terreur dans la prison de Saint-Lazare), with portraits of the most illustrious victims). Also notable are Vive l'Empereur, based on a poem by Méry about an episode in the battle before Paris, March 30, 1814 (1855), Marie Antoinette (1857), A Mass During the Reign of Terror (1863), Desdemona (1868), Lanjuinais at the Tribune (1869), The Madness of King Lear (1875), Charlotte Corday in Prison (1875), Mater Dolorosa (1877), The Martyrdom of St. Bartholomew and The Massacre of the Innocents.

He executed frescoes for the Salle d'État and the Galerie d'Apollon in the Louvre, and for the ceiling of the Salon Denon.

== Gallery (chronological) ==
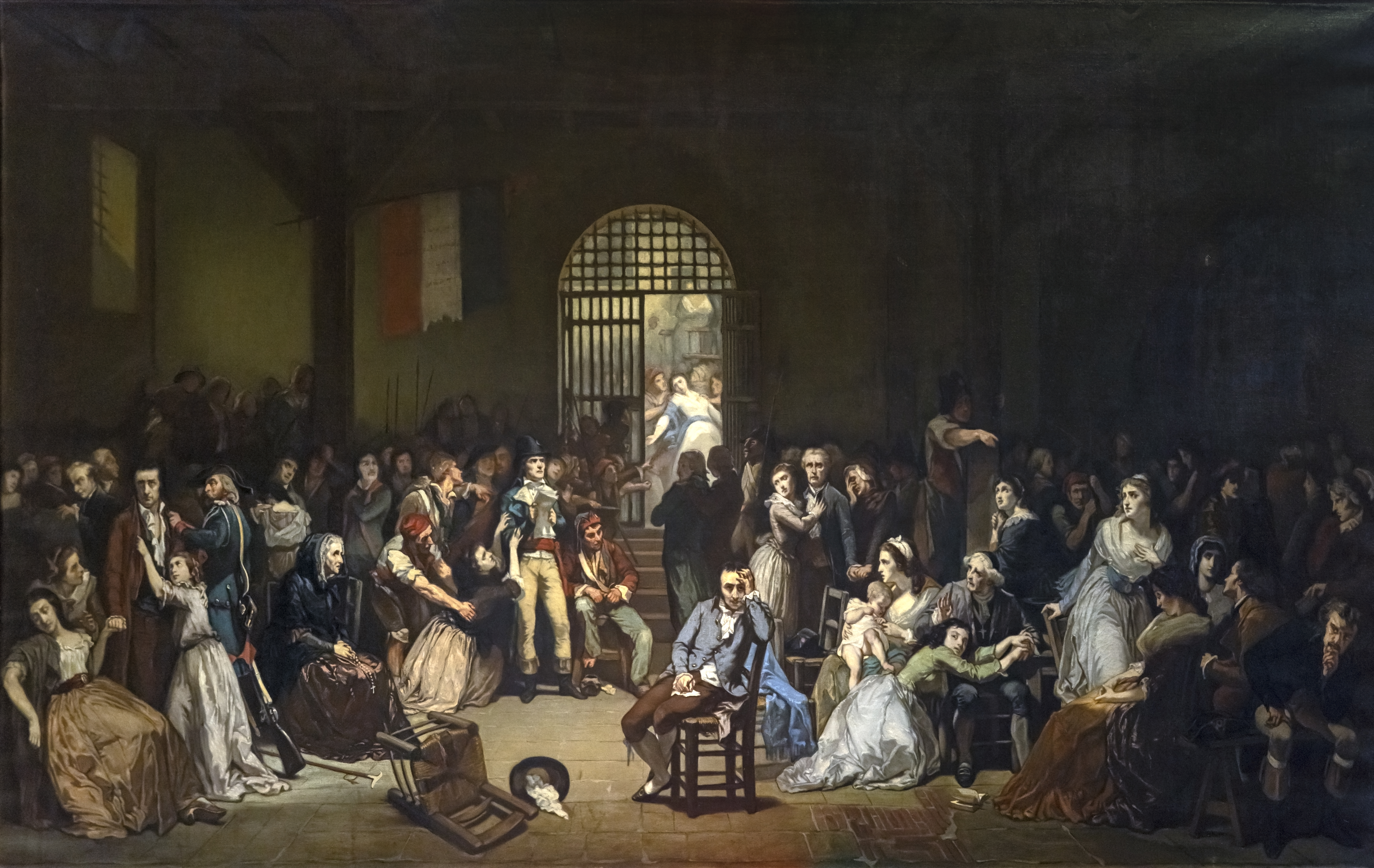
Calling Out the Last Victims of the Terror at Saint Lazare Prison on the 7-9 Thermidor, Year II [25-27 July 1794] (1850), Musée de la Révolution française

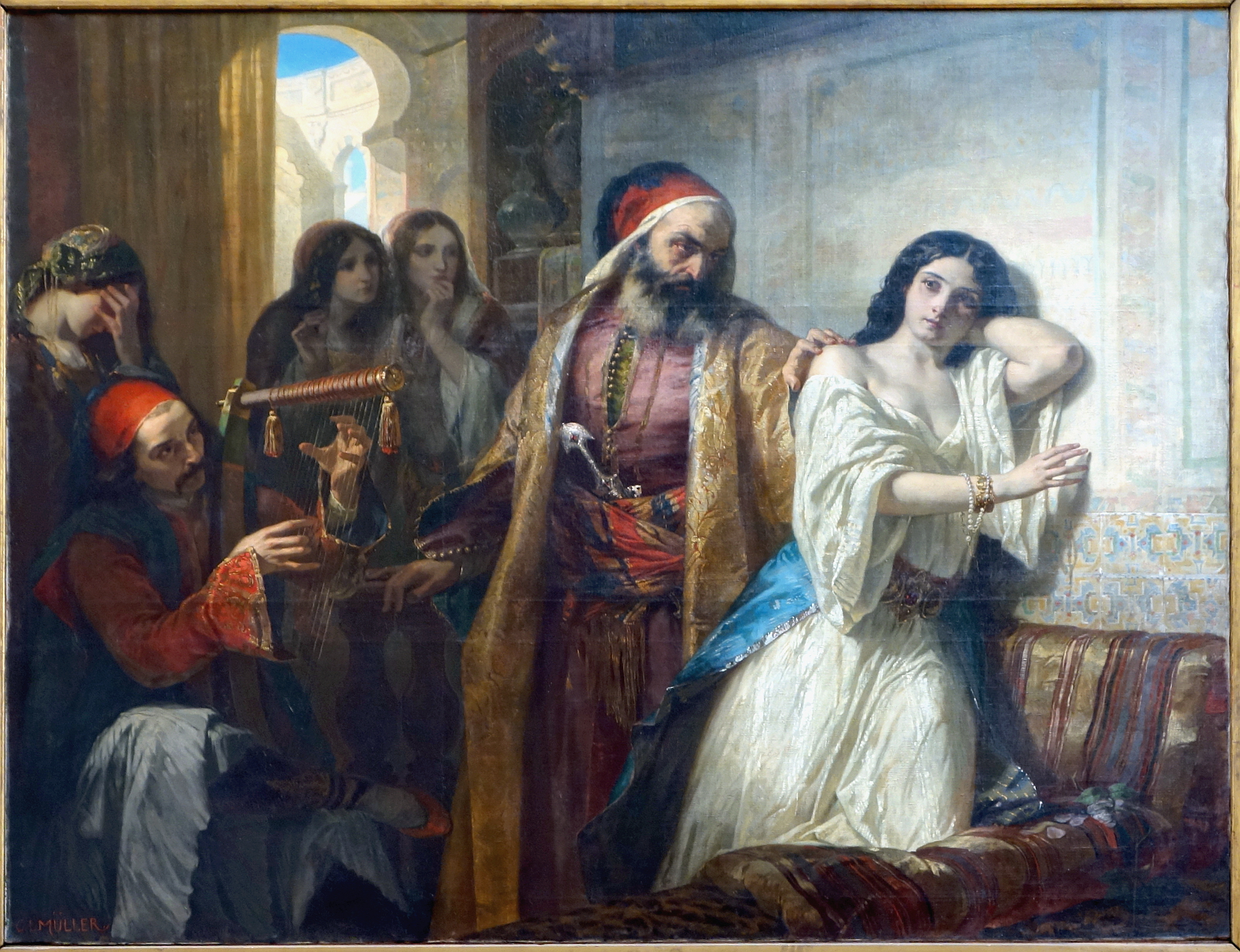
The Madness of Haydée, scene from The Count of Monte Cristo (1848)

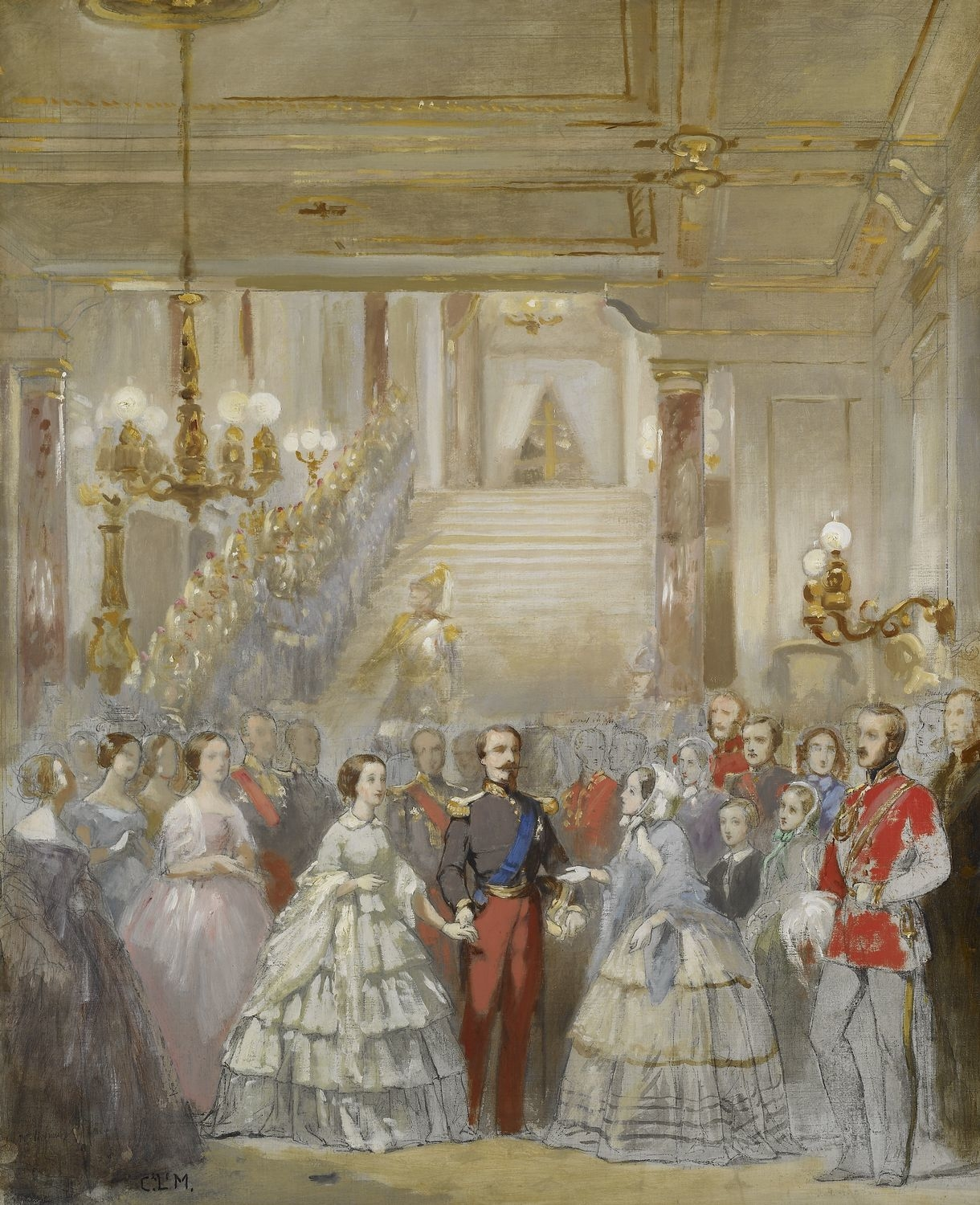
Arrival of the Queen of England at the Palace of Saint Cloud (1855)

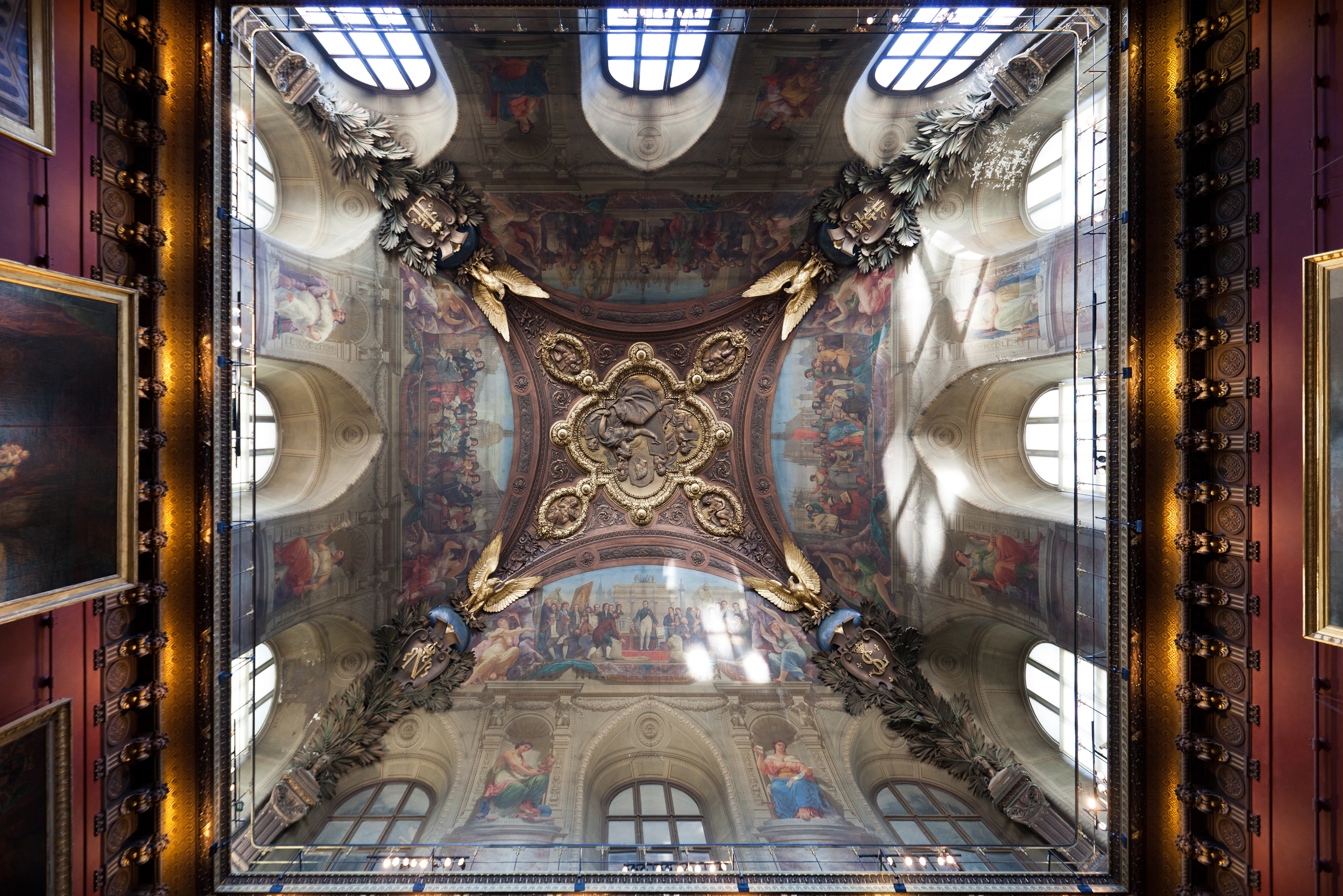
Ceiling of the Salon Denon with frescoes by Müller (1863–1866)

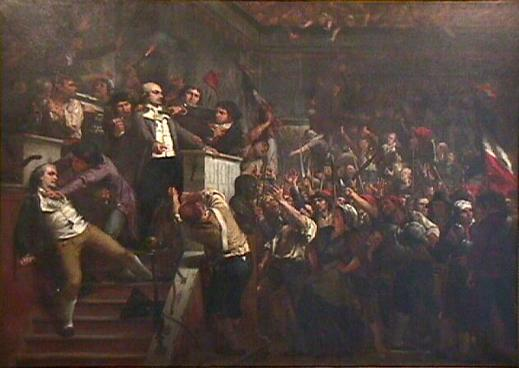
The Tribunal of the National Convention (1868)

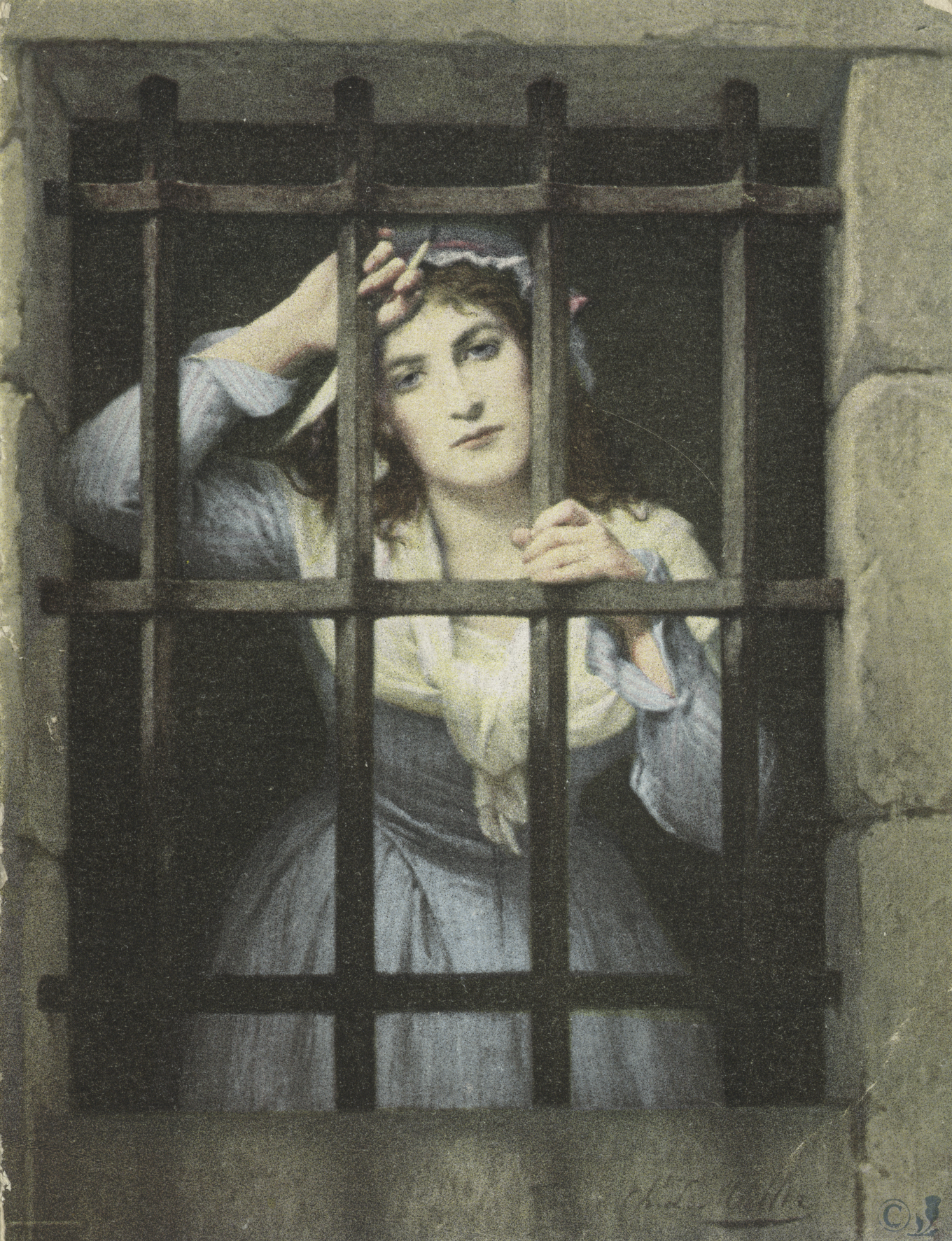
Charlotte Corday in Prison (1875), vintage postcard of the painting of unknown location

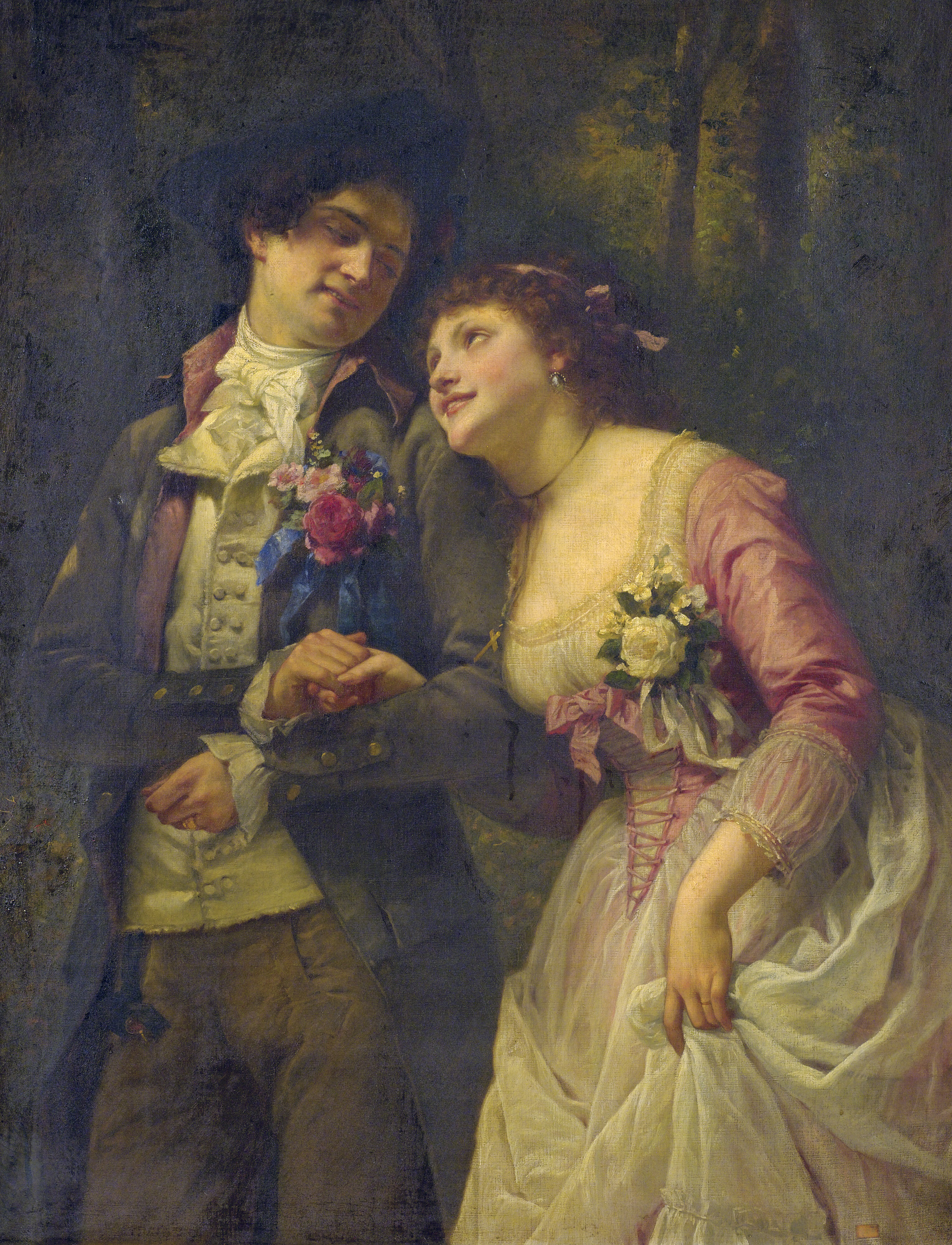
The Betrothed (by 1892)

== Sources ==
- Gilman, D. C.; Peck, H. T.; Colby, F. M., eds. (1905). "Müller, Charles Louis" . New International Encyclopedia (1st ed.). New York: Dodd, Mead.
- Ripley, George; Dana, Charles A., eds. (1879). "Müller, Charles Louis" . The American Cyclopædia.
