= Lycée Les Pierres Vives =

Senior high school in France

Lycée Les Pierres Vives is a senior high school/sixth form college in Carrières-sur-Seine, Yvelines, France, in the Paris metropolitan area.

The name comes from the quote of François Rabelais "Je ne battis que pierres vives, ce sont hommes" (translation: I only build living stones, it's Men).

== People ==
Cécile Kohler was a teacher at the school when she was imprisoned for espionage in Iran.
