= Sartrouville =

- Commune
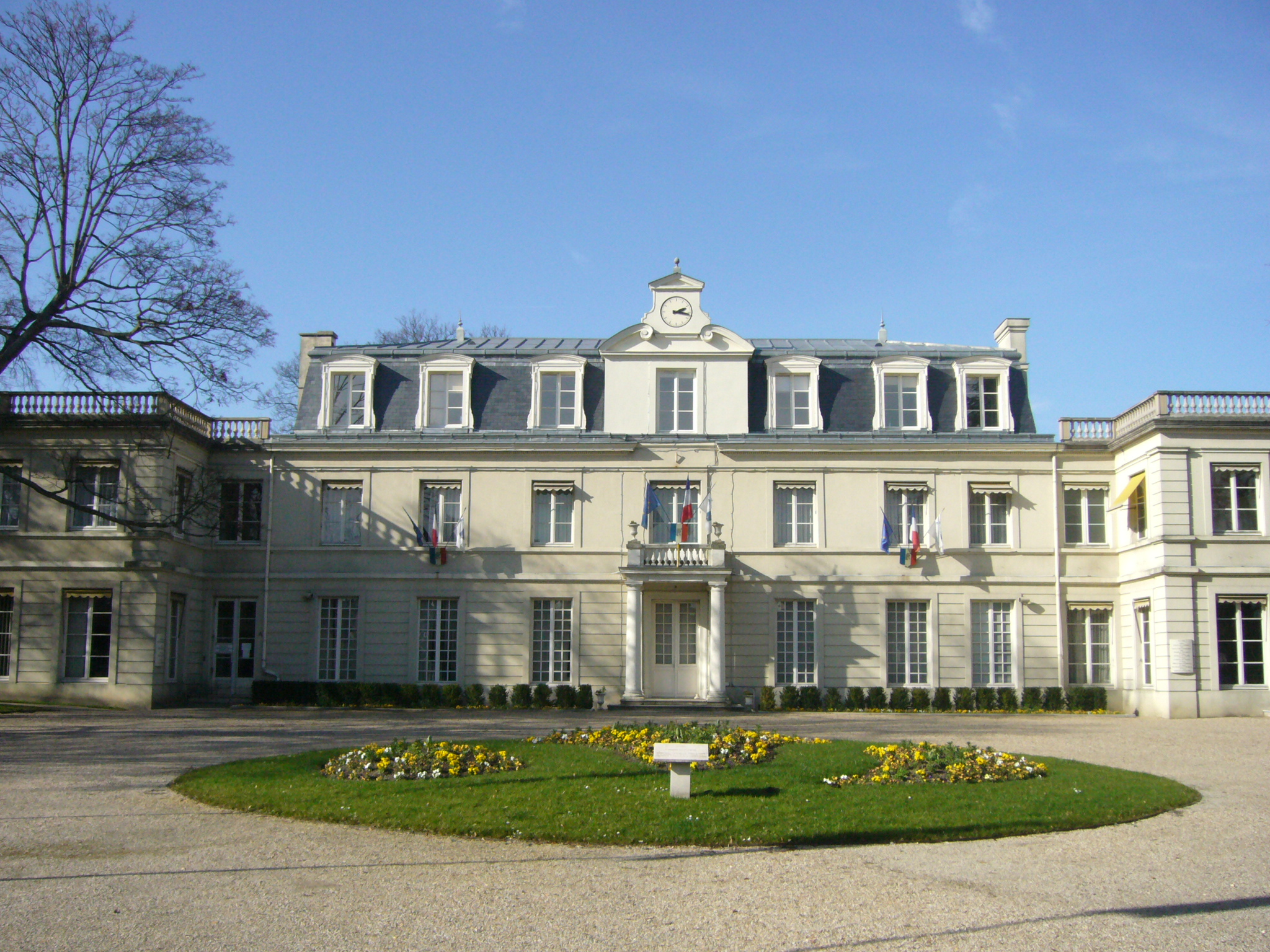
- The Hôtel de Ville

- Coat of arms

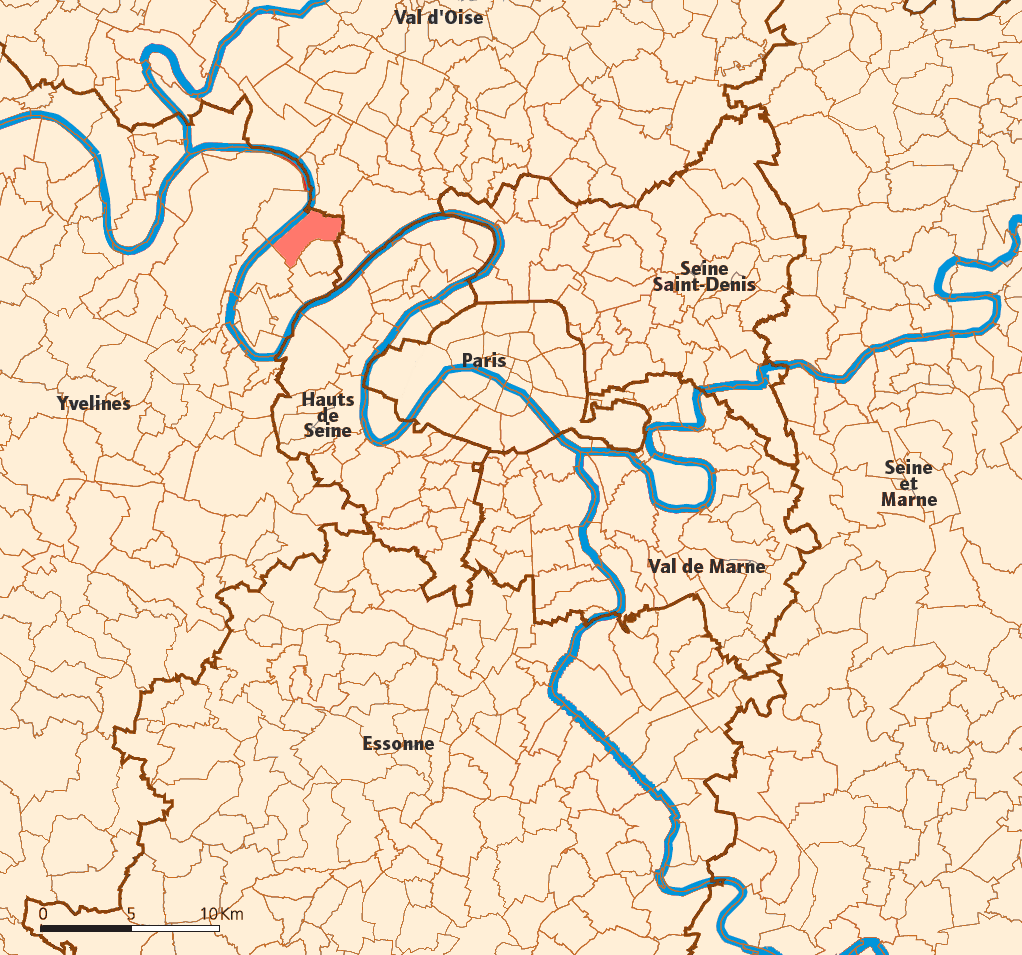
- Location (in red) within Paris inner and outer suburbs
- Location of Sartrouville
- Location within France Location within Île-de-France (region)
- Coordinates: 48°56′14″N 2°09′52″E
- Country: France
- Region: Île-de-France
- Department: Yvelines
- Arrondissement: Saint-Germain-en-Laye
- Canton: Sartrouville
- Intercommunality: CA Saint Germain Boucles Seine

Government
  - Mayor (2020–2026): Pierre Fond
- Area^{1}: 8.46 km^{2} (3.27 sq mi)
- Highest elevation: 62 m (203 ft)
- Lowest elevation: 22 m (72 ft)
- Population (2023): 52,763
  - Density: 6,240/km^{2} (16,200/sq mi)
- Time zone: UTC+01:00 (CET)
  - Summer (DST): UTC+02:00 (CEST)
- INSEE/Postal code: 78586 /78500
- ^{1} French Land Register data, which excludes lakes, ponds, glaciers > 1 km^{2} (0.386 sq mi or 247 acres) and river estuaries.

Sartrouville (French: [saʁtʁuvil]) is a commune in the Yvelines department, Île-de-France, north central France. it is located in the north-western suburbs of Paris, 17.1 km (10.6 mi) from the center of Paris.

== Name ==
In the Middle Ages the name Sartrouville was recorded in Medieval Latin as Sartoris Villa. The origin and meaning of Sartoris Villa is still debated. Some think the name comes from the Roman patronym Saturus (probably a Gallo-Roman landowner) and means "estate (villa) of Saturus". Others believe that the word sartoris comes from the Medieval Latin past participle exsartum ("cleared for cultivation"), from Latin sartum ("hoed"), and means "estate of the land-clearers", probably in reference to the deforestation that took place around Sartrouville in Antiquity or in the Early Middle Ages to enable the cultivation of the land.

== History ==
The Hôtel de Ville was established in 1924.

== Demographics ==
Historical population

Year	Pop.	±% p.a.
1793	1,717	—
1800	1,806	+0.72%
1806	1,661	−1.39%
1821	1,740	+0.31%
1831	1,874	+0.74%
1836	1,666	−2.33%
1841	1,775	+1.28%
1846	1,741	−0.39%
1851	1,662	−0.92%
1856	1,656	−0.07%
1861	1,632	−0.29%
1866	1,631	−0.01%
1872	1,697	+0.66%
1876	1,691	−0.09%
1881	1,730	+0.46%
1886	1,793	+0.72%
1891	1,863	+0.77%
1896	2,215	+3.52%
1901	2,211	−0.04%

Year	Pop.	±% p.a.
1906	2,550	+2.89%
1911	3,602	+7.15%
1921	5,847	+4.96%
1926	10,750	+12.95%
1931	17,354	+10.05%
1936	17,866	+0.58%
1946	17,494	−0.21%
1954	21,743	+2.76%
1962	31,267	+4.65%
1968	40,277	+4.31%
1975	42,253	+0.69%
1982	46,197	+1.28%
1990	50,329	+1.08%
1999	50,219	−0.02%
2007	51,601	+0.34%
2012	51,713	+0.04%
2017	51,967	+0.10%
2023	52,763	+0.25%

Source: EHESS and INSEE (1968-2023)

=== Immigration ===
Place of birth of residents of Sartrouville in 1999
Born in metropolitan France	Born outside metropolitan France			
79.7%	20.3%			
79.7%	Born in overseas France	Born in foreign countries with French citizenship at birth^{1}	EU-15 immigrants^{2}	Non-EU-15 immigrants
79.7%	2.1%	2.0%	6.5%	9.7%
^{1} This group is made up largely of former French settlers, such as pieds-noirs in Northwest Africa, followed by former colonial citizens who had French citizenship at birth (such as was often the case for the native elite in French colonies), as well as to a lesser extent foreign-born children of French expatriates. A foreign country is understood as a country not part of France in 1999, so a person born for example in 1950 in Algeria, when Algeria was an integral part of France, is nonetheless listed as a person born in a foreign country in French statistics.^{2} An immigrant is a person born in a foreign country not having French citizenship at birth. An immigrant may have acquired French citizenship since moving to France, but is still considered an immigrant in French statistics. On the other hand, persons born in France with foreign citizenship (the children of immigrants) are not listed as immigrants.

== Sport ==
Most popular sports can be practiced in Sartrouville, but it is worldwide famous for its triathlon club called ECS Triathlon totalizing 8 olympics medals.

== Transport ==
Sartrouville is served by Sartrouville station on Paris RER line A and on the Transilien Paris-Saint-Lazare suburban rail line.

== Education ==
The commune has 17 preschools and 13 elementary schools, along with a private school.

Junior high schools:

- Collège Colette
- Collège Darius Milhaud
- Collège Louis Paulhan
- Collège Romain Rolland

Senior high schools:

- Lycée Jules-Verne
- Lycée Évariste Galois

Private schools:

- Institut Notre-Dame Lycée Jean-Paul II

== Notable people ==
- Frédéric Machado, footballer

== See also ==
- Communes of the Yvelines department
