= Lycée Évariste Galois (Sartrouville) =

School in Sartrouville, France

Lycée Évariste Galois is a senior high school/sixth-form college in Sartrouville, Yvelines, France, in the Paris metropolitan area.
