= Canton of Montfort-l'Amaury =

Coordinates: 48.8170°N 1.8198°E

The canton of Montfort-l'Amaury is a former canton of France, located in the Yvelines department. It had 44,514 inhabitants (2012). It was disbanded following the French canton reorganisation which came into effect in March 2015.

The canton comprised the following 29 communes:

- Auteuil
- Autouillet
- Bazoches-sur-Guyonne
- Béhoust
- Beynes
- Boissy-sans-Avoir
- Flexanville
- Galluis
- Garancières
- Goupillières
- Grosrouvre
- Jouars-Pontchartrain
- Marcq
- Mareil-le-Guyon
- Méré
- Les Mesnuls
- Millemont
- Montfort-l'Amaury
- Neauphle-le-Château
- Neauphle-le-Vieux
- La Queue-les-Yvelines
- Saint-Germain-de-la-Grange
- Saint-Rémy-l'Honoré
- Saulx-Marchais
- Thoiry
- Le Tremblay-sur-Mauldre
- Vicq
- Villiers-le-Mahieu
- Villiers-Saint-Frédéric
