= Béhoust =

- Commune
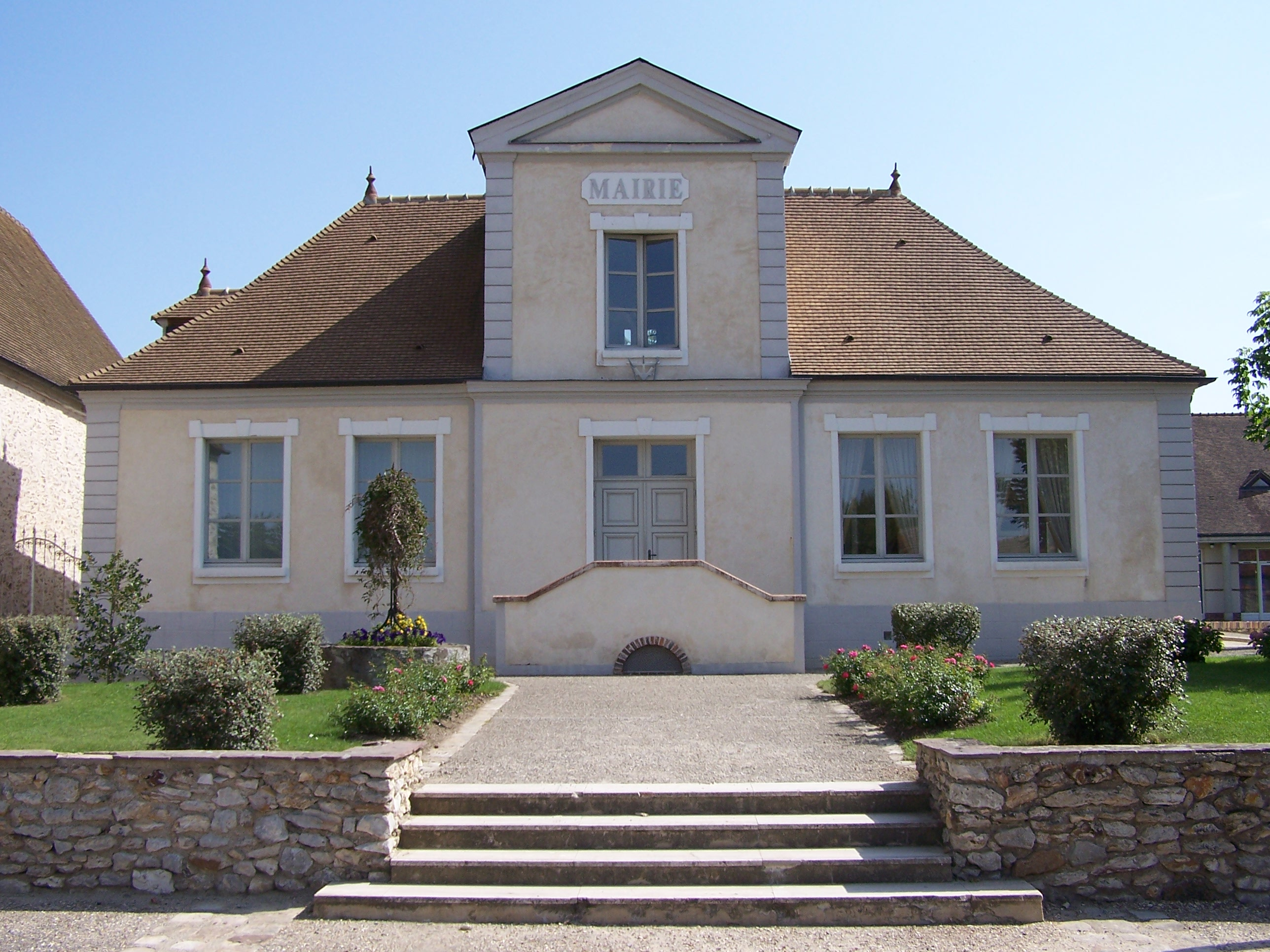
- Town hall
- Location of Béhoust
- Location within France Location within Île-de-France (region)
- Coordinates: 48°50′N 1°43′E
- Country: France
- Region: Île-de-France
- Department: Yvelines
- Arrondissement: Rambouillet
- Canton: Aubergenville
- Intercommunality: Cœur d'Yvelines

Government
  - Mayor (2026–32): Guy Pélissier
- Area^{1}: 5.34 km^{2} (2.06 sq mi)
- Elevation: 126 m (413 ft)
- Highest elevation: 171 m (561 ft)
- Lowest elevation: 88 m (289 ft)
- Population (2023): 533
  - Density: 99.8/km^{2} (259/sq mi)
- Time zone: UTC+01:00 (CET)
  - Summer (DST): UTC+02:00 (CEST)
- INSEE/Postal code: 78053 /78910
- Website: www.behoust.fr
- ^{1} French Land Register data, which excludes lakes, ponds, glaciers > 1 km^{2} (0.386 sq mi or 247 acres) and river estuaries.

Béhoust is a commune in the Yvelines department in north-central France. Its inhabitants are called Béhoustiens in French.

== Geography ==
Béhoust lies in the west of the Yvelines department, about 18 km (11 mi) south of Mantes-la-Jolie and 30 km (19 mi) west of Versailles. It is bordered by Flexanville to the north, Garancières to the east, Millemont to the south and Orgerus to the west.

The Avre aqueduct, which carries drinking water to Paris, crosses the commune in a buried trench.

The departemental road D42 crosses the commune from east to west.

== See also ==
- Communes of the Yvelines department
