= Montainville, Yvelines =

Montainville
- Commune
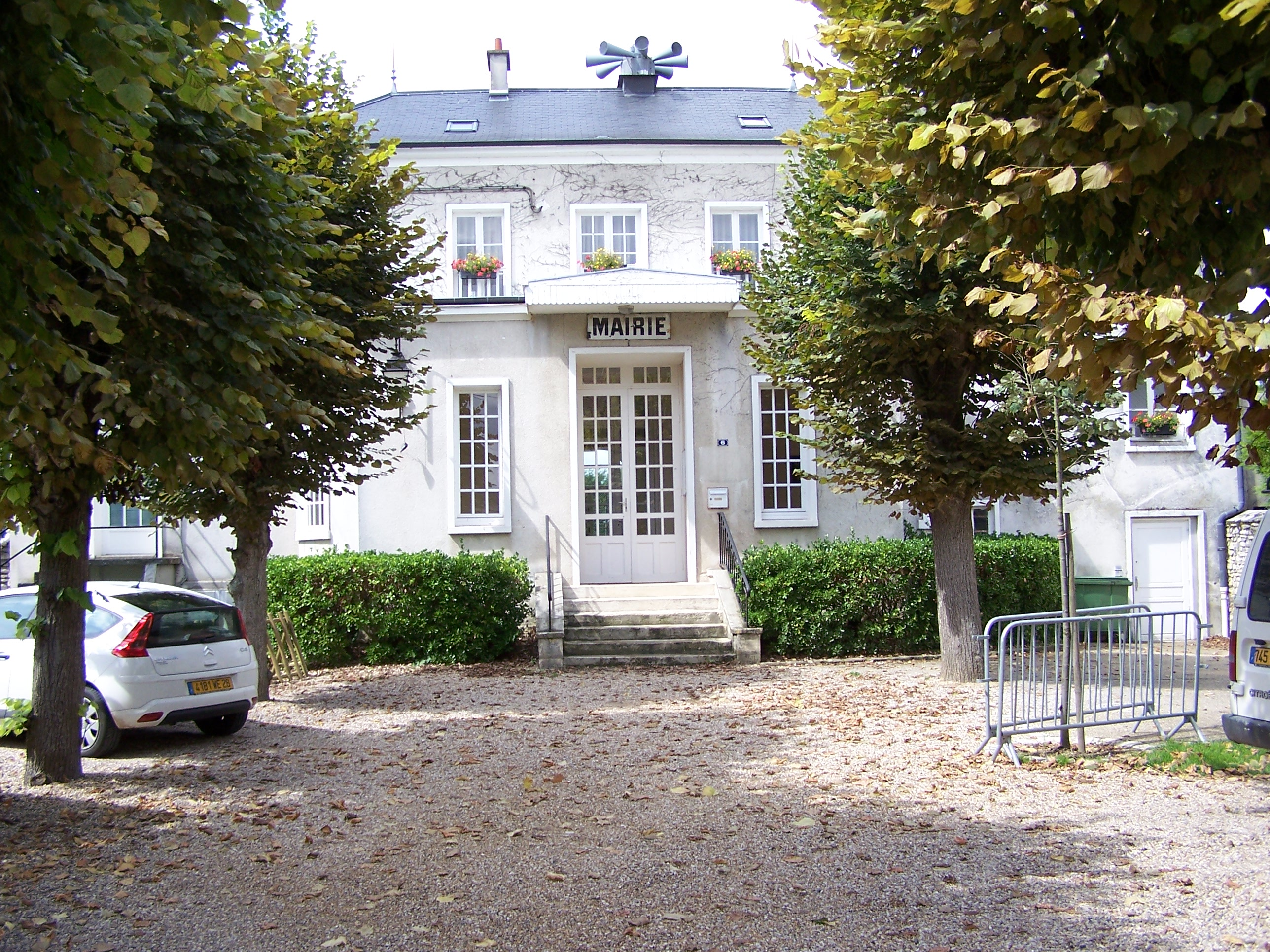
- The town hall in Montainville

- Coat of arms
- Location of Montainville
- Location within France Location within Île-de-France (region)
- Coordinates: 48°52′55″N 1°51′40″E
- Country: France
- Region: Île-de-France
- Department: Yvelines
- Arrondissement: Saint-Germain-en-Laye
- Canton: Aubergenville

Government
  - Mayor (2020–2026): Eric Martin
- Area^{1}: 4.79 km^{2} (1.85 sq mi)
- Elevation: 137 m (449 ft)
- Highest elevation: 131 m (430 ft)
- Lowest elevation: 37 m (121 ft)
- Population (2023): 589
  - Density: 123/km^{2} (318/sq mi)
- Time zone: UTC+01:00 (CET)
  - Summer (DST): UTC+02:00 (CEST)
- INSEE/Postal code: 78415 /78124
- ^{1} French Land Register data, which excludes lakes, ponds, glaciers > 1 km^{2} (0.386 sq mi or 247 acres) and river estuaries.

Montainville (French pronunciation: [mɔ̃tɛ̃vil]) is a commune in the Yvelines department in the Île-de-France region in north-central France.

== Geography ==
Montainville is located in the centre of the Yvelines department, at 19 km in the south-east of Mantes-la-Jolie and 26 km in the north-west of Versailles. The river Mauldre is at the east of the city.

The territory of Montainville is relatively small (479 hectares while the average in the department is 872). It is located between the Mantois plateau and Mauldre valley, the village is at the edge of the plateau at a height of around 120m.

As in the rest of the region, Montainville has a temperate oceanic climate. Temperatures vary between 2 °C and 5 °C in winter and 14 °C and 25 °C in summer on average, with a relatively low amount of rainfall (600mm per year).

== Urbanism ==
The territory of the municipality is covered in 2017 at 89,67% of agricultural, forest and natural land, 4,41% of open artificial spaces and 5,93% of built artificial spaces. The territory is essentially rural, and the urban area represents only 25 hectares.

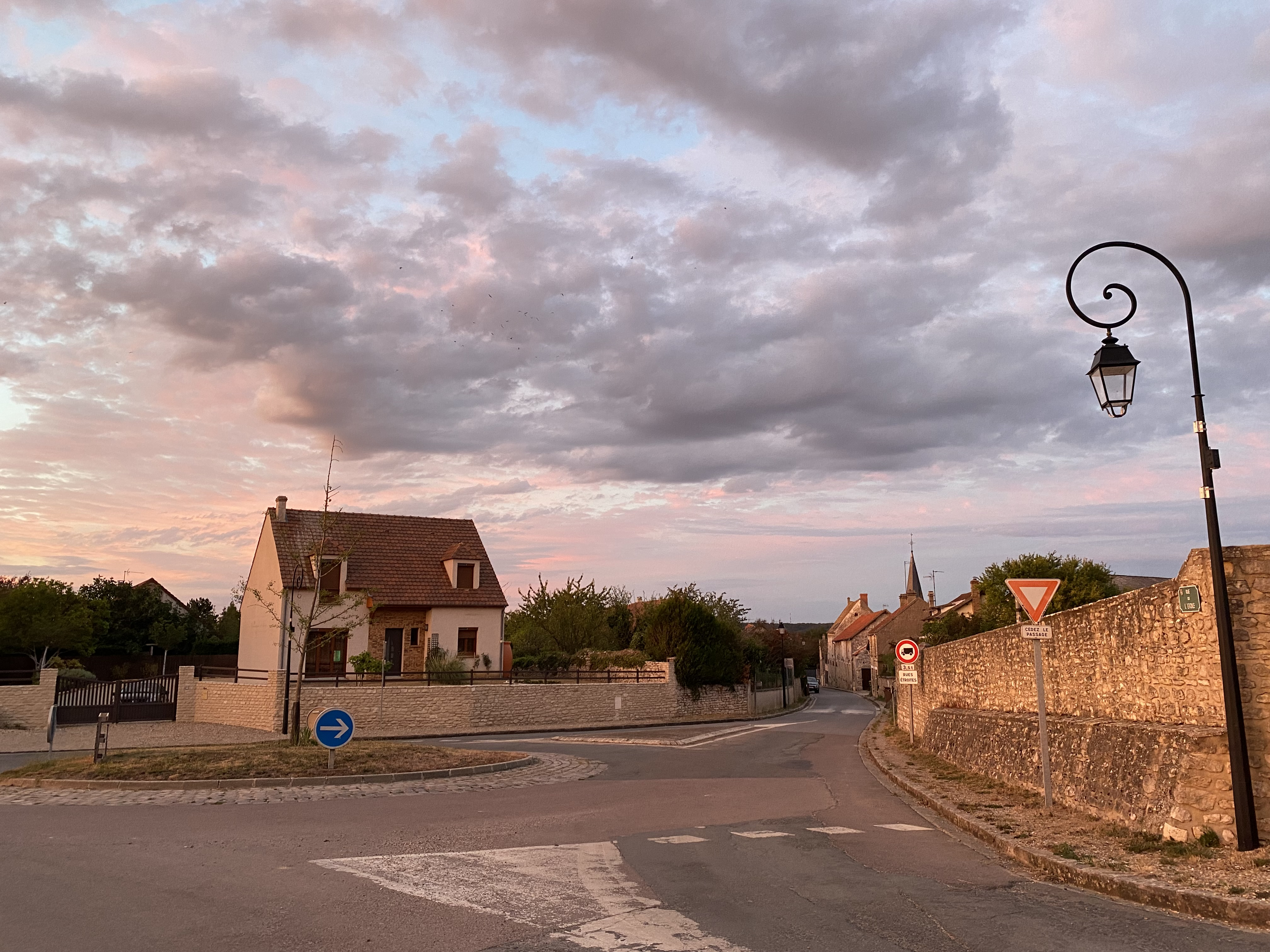
Streets in Montainville

The inhabited space is concentrated in the village, with a few houses along the river Mauldre. In Montainville, we can find mainly stone houses and rural residences, built notably in the 19th century. New residential areas were built during the 20th century. Housing in Montainville was recorded in 1999. At the time, the village was composed of 222 accommodations, 174 of them being a main residence and 33 a second home. In 2019, there was 262 houses with 79,5% of main residences.

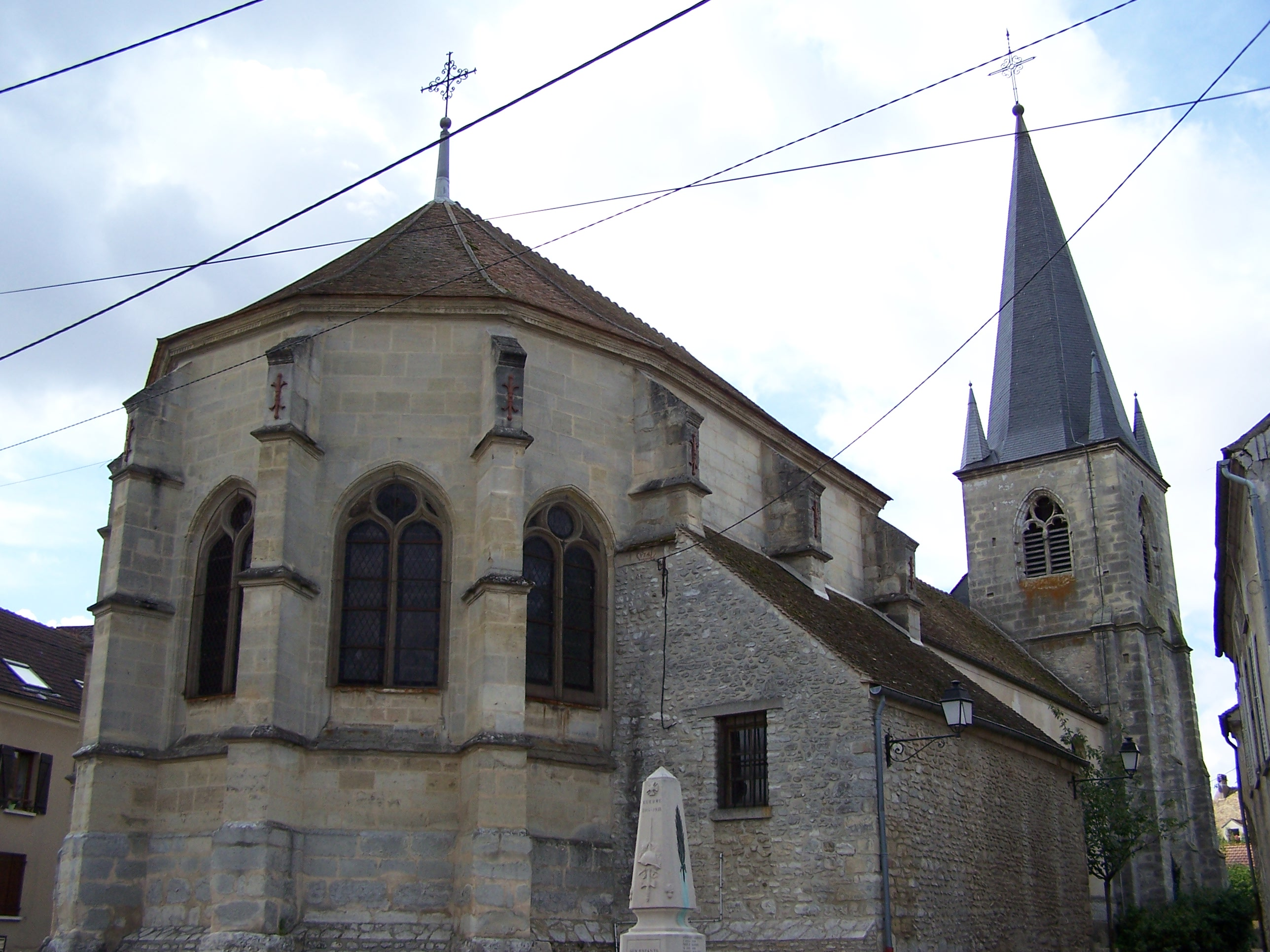
L'Assomption-de-la-Vierge Church

Real estate in Montainville is relatively old, 70% of the houses were built before 1975 and 45% before 1949 (while the average in the region is 33,7%). The vast majority of inhabitants, around 81%, were owners of their houses at the time of the record.

== Toponymy ==
The name of the town was recorded under different forms including Montenvilla around 1130 and in 1220, Montainvilla around 1248, in 1272 and in 1351, Montainville 1370, Montainvilla in 1494, Montainville in 1564, Matinville around the 17th century.

The name of the village is derived of the medieval wording ending in -ville which refers to a country estate, where the first part of the word Montain- represents the name of a person.

Homonymy with Montainville (Eure-et-Loir).

== History ==
=== The origins ===
The valley of the Mauldre was conducive to human development during the Palaeolithic. Prehistoric tools were found, such as flint. Human presence was also certified during the Neolithic period with the first cultivated lands of cereals.

=== Antiquity ===
From the 3rd to the 1st century BC, Montainville was in the territory of the Gallic tribe of Carnutes which extended between the Loire and Seine rivers, with two main cities, Autriacum (Chartres) and Genabum (Orléans).

From the 1st to the 3rd century, the territory was occupied by the Roman Empire. Montainville was included in the Provincia lugdunencia or Gaule Lyonnaise in French. Gallo-Roman sites were discovered in the 20th century on the plateau between Montainville and Andelu. The dig notably revealed the presence of a Roman paved road and a fanum.

=== Middle Ages (5th-15th century) ===
During the Merovingian and the Carolingian dynasties in the early Middle-Ages, archaeological evidence underlines activities on the site of the Ferme du Fort (Fort farm), increasing after the 9th century.

In the 12th century, there is a first lord of Montainville. But the village depend on the lordship of the nearby town of Maule during some periods. In 1234, the independent parish of Montainville is created.

In 1398, the lordship is in the hands of Simon de Morainvillier. Under the seigneury of the Morainvillier, the old castle is turned into a manor house (current Ferme du fort). Jean de Morainvillier built an hotel of Château brilliant (Châteaubriant) for his son-in-law, at the location of the current town hall.

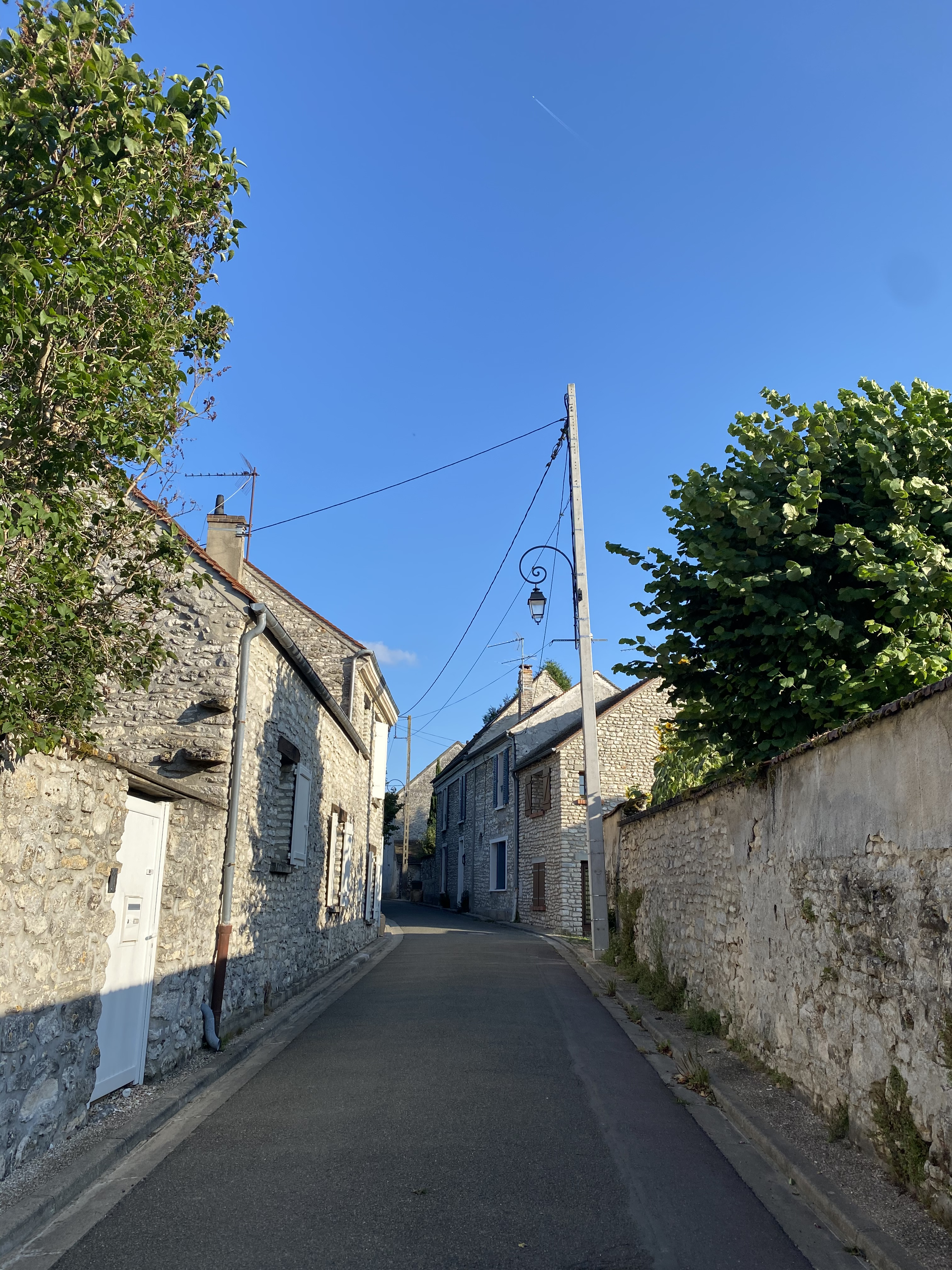
Rue du Montquignon

=== 16th – 17th century ===
The successor of the family, Jehanne de Morainvillier, brings the lordship of Montainville and Mareil as her dowry during her marriage with Oudard Blondel de Joigny, baron of Bellebrune.

She becomes a widow and marries Dominique de Vic on the 5th of May 1578. Together, they rebuild the choir of the church of Montainville around 1603. The keystones of the church are decorated by their coat of arms. Dominique de Vic was a reputed warrior who fight for the King Henri III and Henri IV.

In 1620, Jacqueline de Morainvillier inherits of the lordship of Montainville. She is the wife of Nicolas de Sancy, who gives his name to the famous Sancy diamond. A few years later, he will sell the lordship to Claude de Bullion, the minister of finance under Louis 13 who invented the coin Louis d’or.

=== Falconry of the King ===
Louis XIII was passionate of hunting (which motivated the construction of a residence in Versailles near hunting areas that will become under Louis XIV the Palace of Versailles) in particular hunting with birds of prey. His successor Louis XIV neglects this tradition and establishes the royal falconry in Montainville. The Fauconnerie du Cabinet du Roi is under the direction of the family of Jean-Claude Forget who lives in the village.

Due to this proximity of Versailles, Montainville inhabitants live in a prosperous period with a bakery, 2 mills, several country inn, restaurants, and other shops in the village. At that time, Montainville was a land of vineyard, a local wine and a cider were produced.

Before the French Revolution, the lordship of Montainville is in the hands of the family established nearby in the Castle of Wideville. The last representant of the lords of Montainville, Anne-Julie Françoise de Crussol d'Uzès, will escape the troubles of the Revolution because she was liked by the population.

One of the two bells of the church of Montainville (named Saint-Lubin) was melted during the Revolution and maybe transformed into a cannon.

=== Contemporary period ===
The famous French actor and singer Bourvil (André Raimbourg) lived in Montainville with his family from 1955 to his death in 1970. He is buried in the cemetery of the village.

The house of Mal (Marion Cotillard) in the American movie Inception is located in Montainville.

== Politic and administration ==
Mayors of Montainville
From	To	Name	Political color
1945	1947	Marius Lamarre	
1947	1959	Roger Olivier	
1959	1971	André Hérard	
1971	1983	Paul Pouliquen	
1983	2003	Serge Raoux	
2003	2008	Pascale Oger	
2008	En cours	Eric Martin	

Montainville belongs to the canton of Aubergenville and is included in the community of municipalities of Gally Mauldre. It subscribed to the association Plaine de Versailles.

Concerning voting, the town belongs to the 9th electoral district of the Yvelines.

== Population and society ==
=== Demography ===
The inhabitants are called Montainvillois and Montainvilloise in French.

Historical population

Year	Pop.	±% p.a.
1793	540	—
1821	484	−0.39%
1846	445	−0.34%
1872	335	−1.09%
1901	304	−0.33%
1926	267	−0.52%
1946	205	−1.31%
1954	242	+2.10%
1962	305	+2.93%

Year	Pop.	±% p.a.
1968	317	+0.65%
1975	396	+3.23%
1982	382	−0.51%
1990	419	+1.16%
1999	507	+2.14%
2007	559	+1.23%
2012	537	−0.80%
2017	506	−1.18%
2023	589	+2.56%

Source: EHESS and INSEE (1968-2023)

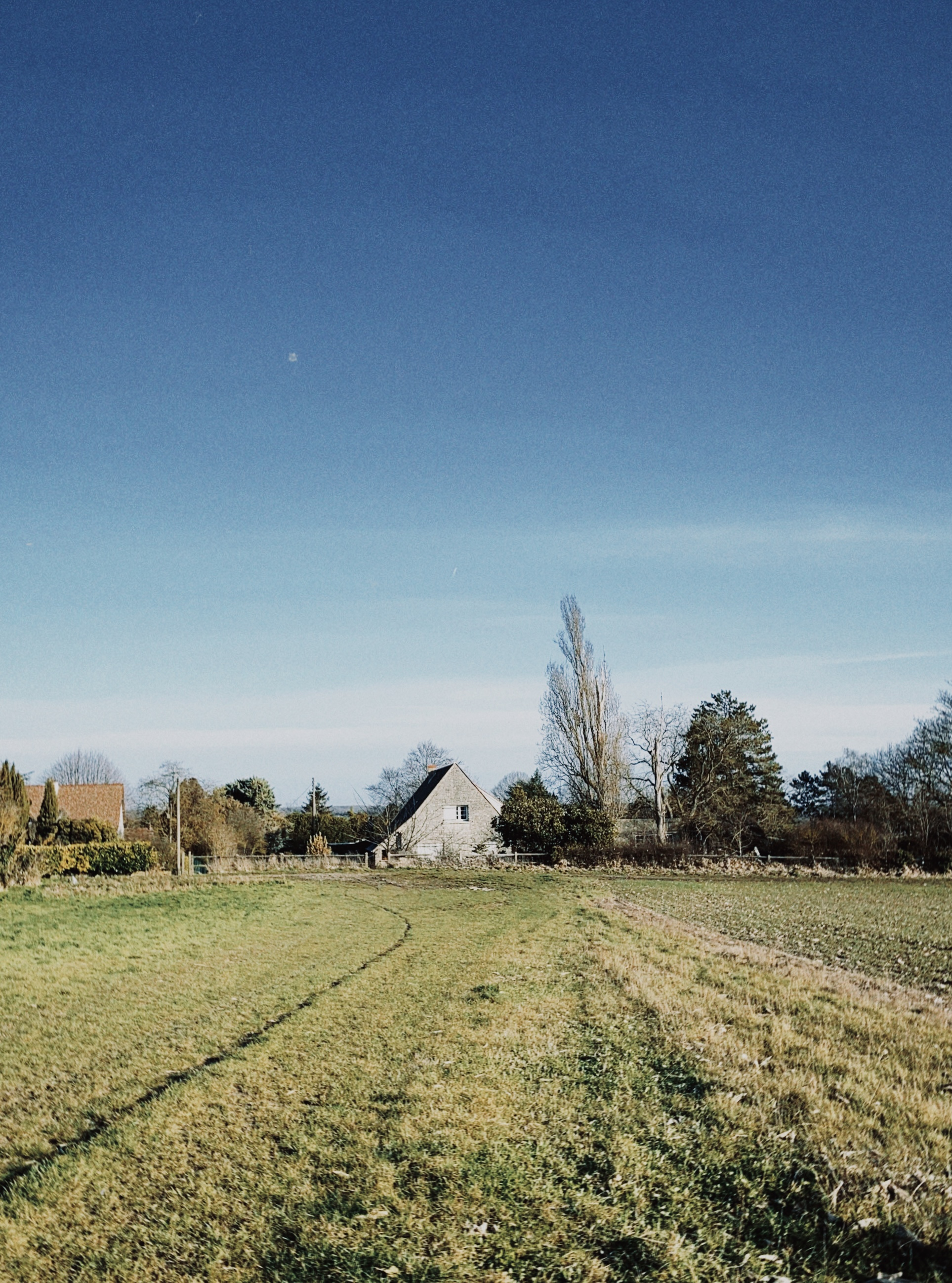
Fields outside Montainville

=== School ===
Montainville depend on the school inspectorate of Versailles (Académie de Versailles). The city have a kindergarten and primary school, altogether in a same building, with 3 classes and an average of 60 children.

=== Economy ===
- Agriculture (mainly cereals)
- Residential area

A restaurant is located in the village square. The town also have several lodges, including one in the building of the Falconry of the King.

== Culture and heritage ==
- Church Our Lady of Montainville
- Fort farm (Ferme du Fort)
- Town hall
- Falconry of the King
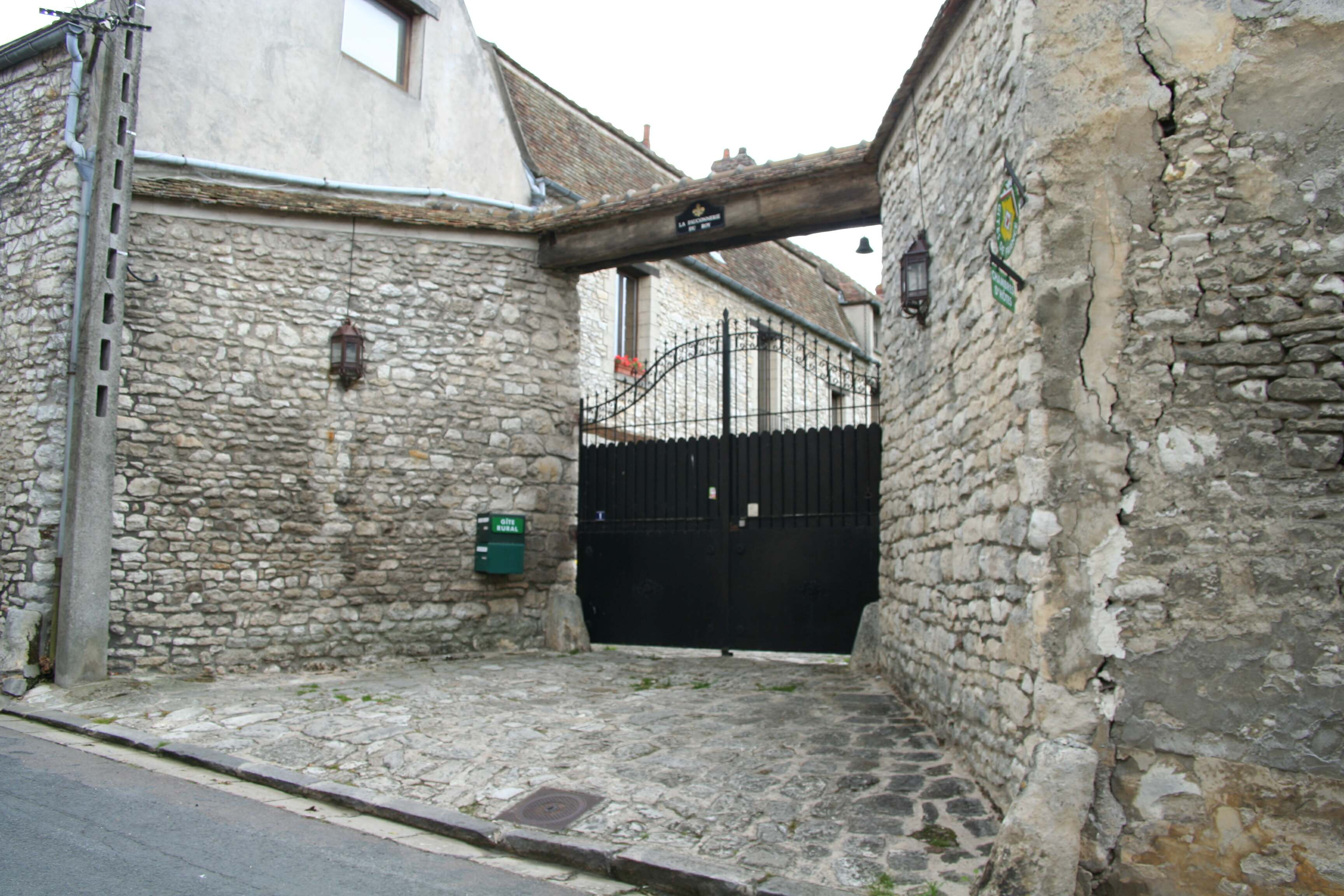
  Falconry of the King
- Washhouse, on the street from Mareil
- Basin of the Serpe, ancient drinking trough for herds

== Bibliography ==
Le patrimoine des communes des Yvelines - tome 1, Paris, Editions Flohic, 2000, 1155 p., « Montainville », p. 84–86

Jacques Tréton, Histoire de Montainville en Pincerais, Tréton J.A., 1998, 515 p.

== See also ==
- Communes of the Yvelines department
