= Ghislain Cloquet =

French cinematographer (1924–1981)

- Born: Ghislain Pierre Cloquet; 18 April 1924; Antwerp, Antwerp Province, Belgium
- Died: 2 November 1981 (aged 57); Montainville, Yvelines, France
- Education: ENS Louis-Lumière; IDHEC
- Occupation: Cinematographer
- Years active: 1953–1981
- Relatives: Jacques Becker (father-in-law); Jean Becker (brother-in-law); Étienne Becker (brother-in-law)

Ghislain Pierre Cloquet (18 April 1924 – 2 November 1981) was a Belgian-French cinematographer and academic. He won an Academy Award, BAFTA Award, and Cesar Award for his work on Tess (1979).

== Early life and education ==
Cloquet was born in Antwerp in 1924. He was educated in Brussels and, after 1940 in Paris. He graduated from the ENS Louis-Lumière in 1945, and the Institut des hautes études cinématographiques (IDHEC) in 1947, and became a naturalized French citizen.

== Career ==
Cloquet is known for his work with Robert Bresson, though he also collaborated with other prominent French directors like Louis Malle, Claude Sautet, Jacques Demy, André Delvaux, Chris Marker, and Marguerite Duras. He shot Jacques Becker's last film, Le Trou, and then worked several times with Becker's son Jean, who was Cloquet's brother-in-law. He won an Oscar (on his first and only nomination) for his work on Roman Polanski's Tess, which he completed after the death of Geoffrey Unsworth.

He also worked with several non-French directors, including Woody Allen (Love and Death) and Arthur Penn (Mickey One, Four Friends).

=== Teaching ===
Cloquet was the head of the cinematography department at his alma mater at the IDHEC from 1954 to 1962, and was its director of studies from 1975 to 1979. He co-founded the Institut national supérieur des arts du spectacle et des techniques de diffusion (INSAS) in his former hometown Brussels in 1962, and taught there annually for two months out of the year, until 1974.

== Personal life ==
Cloquet married into the Becker filmmaking family (which included directors Jacques and Jean, cinematographer Étienne, and actress Françoise Fabian), when he wed Jacques Becker's daughter Sophie, then a script girl.

=== Death ===
Cloquet died in Montainville, Yvelines on 2 November 1981, at the age of 57.

== Awards and nominations ==
Institution	Year	Category	Work	Result
Academy Awards	1981	Best Cinematography	Tess	Won
British Academy Film Awards	1982	Best Cinematography	Tess	Won
British Society of Cinematographers	1981	Best Cinematography in a Theatrical Feature Film	Tess	Nominated
César Awards	1980	Best Cinematography	Tess	Won
Los Angeles Film Critics Association	1980	Best Cinematography	Tess	Won
National Society of Film Critics	1981	Best Cinematography	Tess	Nominated
New York Film Critics Circle	1980	Best Cinematography	Tess	Won
