= Nézel =

- Commune
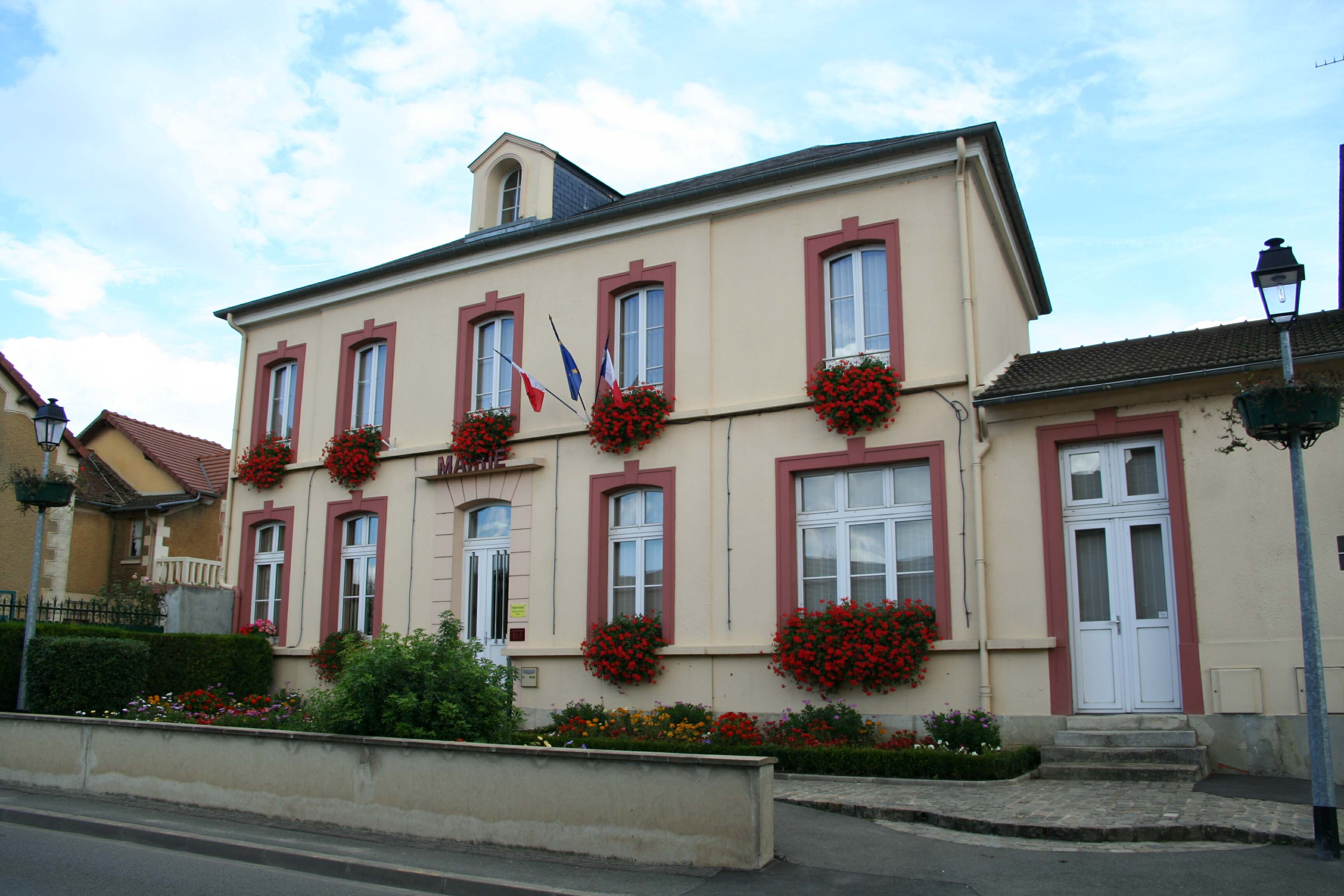
- Town hall

- Coat of arms
- Location of Nézel
- Location within France Location within Île-de-France (region)
- Coordinates: 48°56′43″N 1°50′14″E
- Country: France
- Region: Île-de-France
- Department: Yvelines
- Arrondissement: Mantes-la-Jolie
- Canton: Aubergenville
- Intercommunality: CU Grand Paris Seine et Oise

Government
  - Mayor (2020–2026): Dominique Turpin
- Area^{1}: 1.31 km^{2} (0.51 sq mi)
- Elevation: 29 m (95 ft)
- Highest elevation: 108 m (354 ft)
- Lowest elevation: 19 m (62 ft)
- Population (2023): 1,139
  - Density: 869/km^{2} (2,250/sq mi)
- Time zone: UTC+01:00 (CET)
  - Summer (DST): UTC+02:00 (CEST)
- INSEE/Postal code: 78451 /78410
- ^{1} French Land Register data, which excludes lakes, ponds, glaciers > 1 km^{2} (0.386 sq mi or 247 acres) and river estuaries.

Nézel (French pronunciation: [nezɛl]) is the commune in the Yvelines department in the Île-de-France region in north-central France.

== See also ==
- Communes of the Yvelines department
