= Bazemont =

- Commune
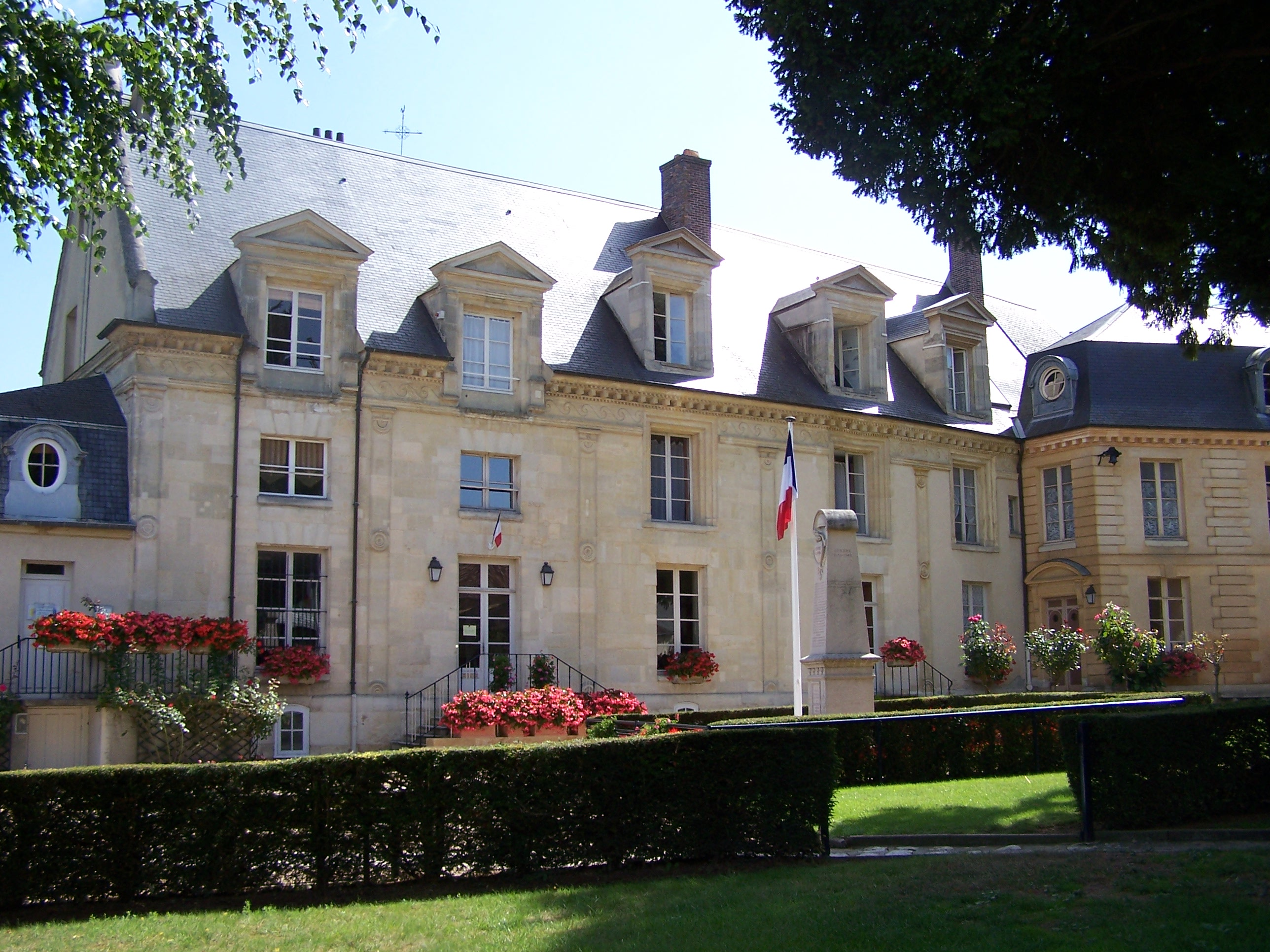
- Town hall

- Coat of arms
- Location of Bazemont
- Location within France Location within Île-de-France (region)
- Coordinates: 48°55′41″N 1°51′54″E
- Country: France
- Region: Île-de-France
- Department: Yvelines
- Arrondissement: Saint-Germain-en-Laye
- Canton: Aubergenville

Government
  - Mayor (2020–2026): Jean-Bernard Hetzel
- Area^{1}: 6.59 km^{2} (2.54 sq mi)
- Elevation: 120 m (390 ft)
- Highest elevation: 185 m (607 ft)
- Lowest elevation: 35 m (115 ft)
- Population (2023): 1,727
  - Density: 262/km^{2} (679/sq mi)
- Time zone: UTC+01:00 (CET)
  - Summer (DST): UTC+02:00 (CEST)
- INSEE/Postal code: 78049 /78580
- ^{1} French Land Register data, which excludes lakes, ponds, glaciers > 1 km^{2} (0.386 sq mi or 247 acres) and river estuaries.

Bazemont (French pronunciation: [bazmɔ̃]) is a commune in the Yvelines department in Île-de-France, northern France. It is situated 18 km south east of the town of Mantes-la-Jolie.

Bazemont means "la montagne de Baso", Baso's Mountain.

== Geography ==
The commune of Bazemont contains the following smaller geographical areas (lieux-dits):

- Les chênes
- Sainte Colombe et bois de Sainte Colombe
- la Mare Plate
- chapelle du Roncé
- carrefour de la vallée
- route à Mayeul
- le château de Bisouter
- Beulle
- carrefour de la Cockejoie
- l’orme Philippien (abords de Maule)
- la vallée Boule
- la Malmaison
- la Roise
- la Vallée Rogère
- le Déluge
- le Poirier à Cheval
- les Petites Aunes
- les Vingt Arpents
- les Grands Jardins
- la Pie
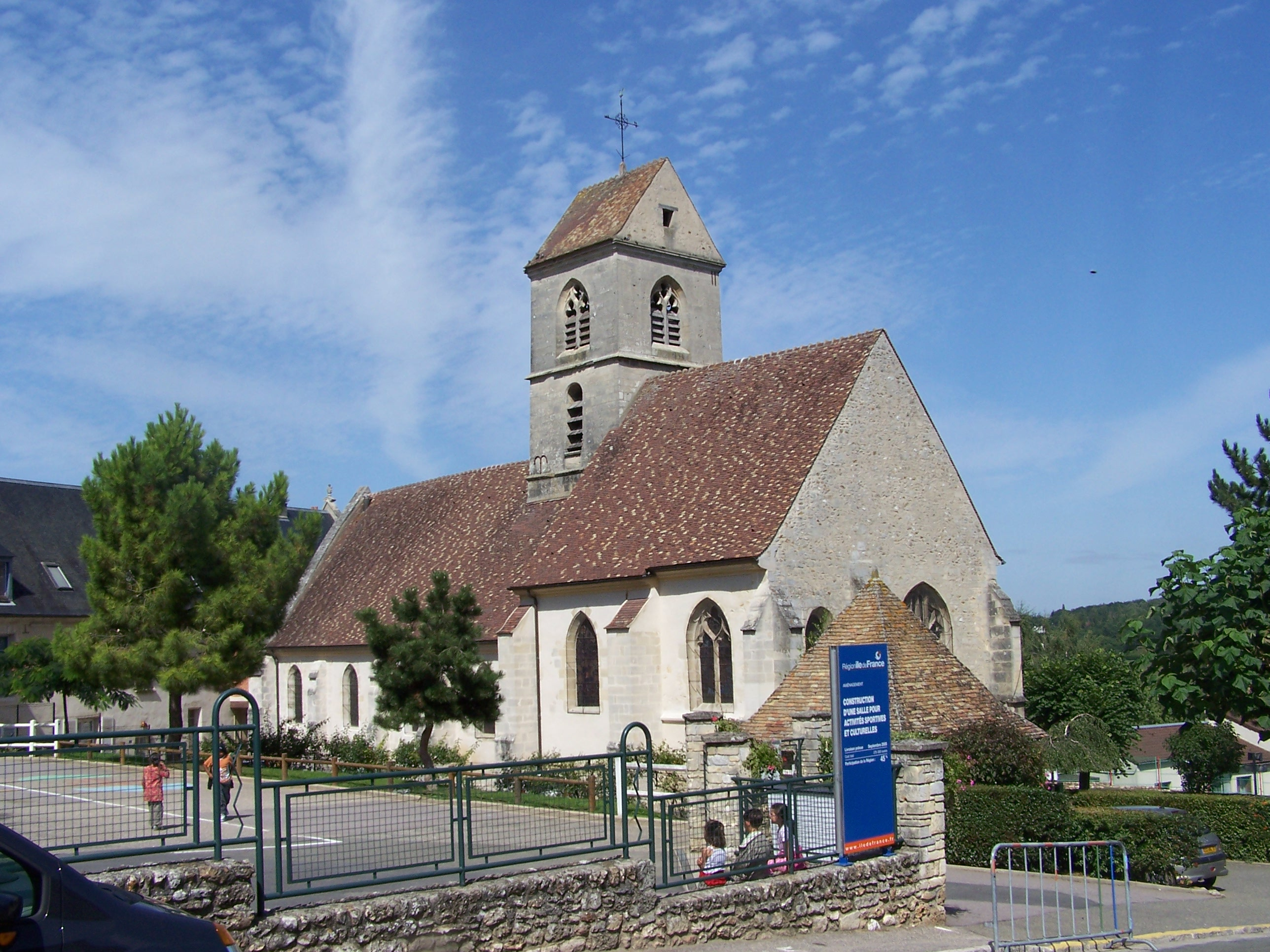
Saint-Illiers

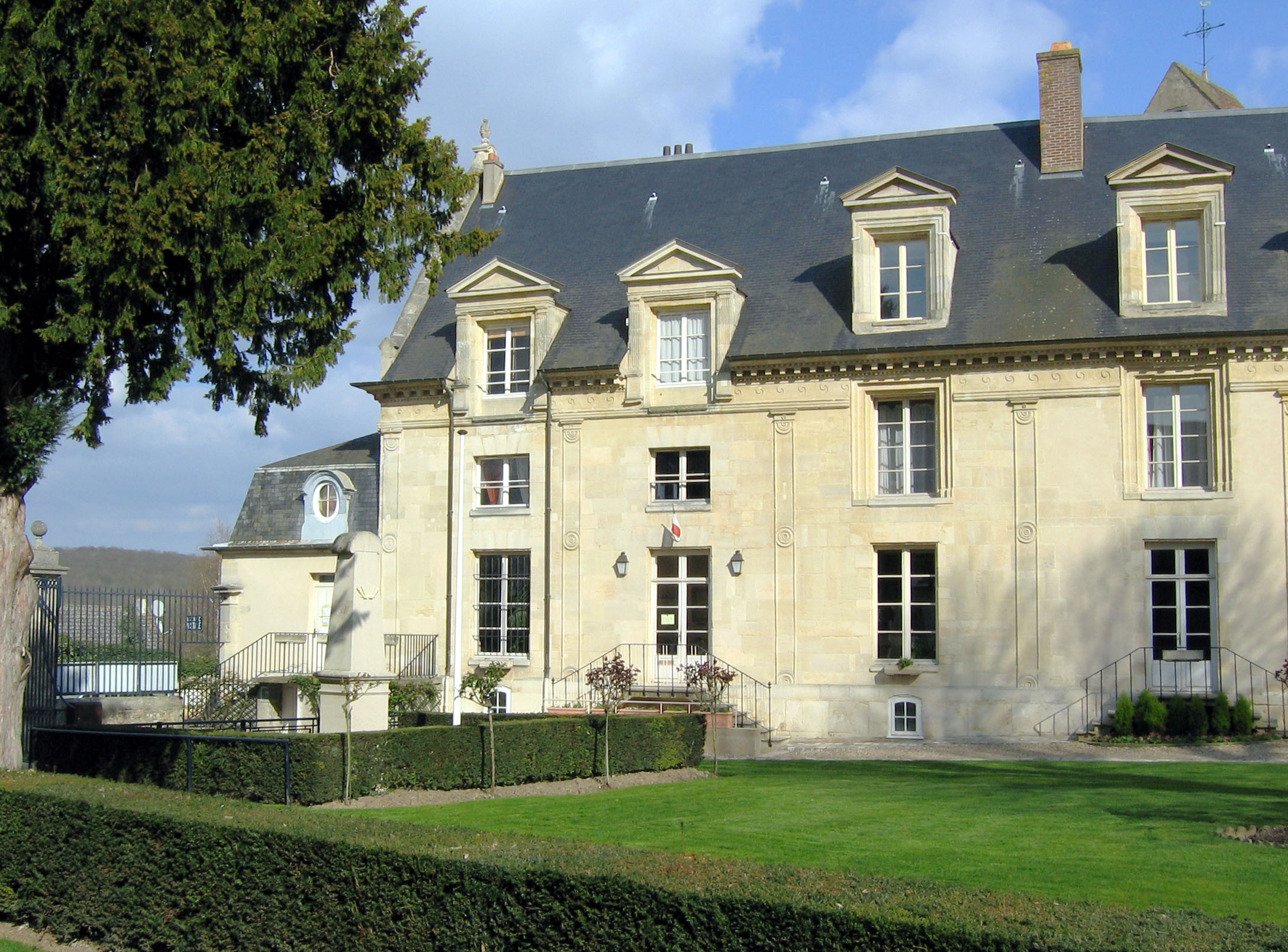
Mairie - Château

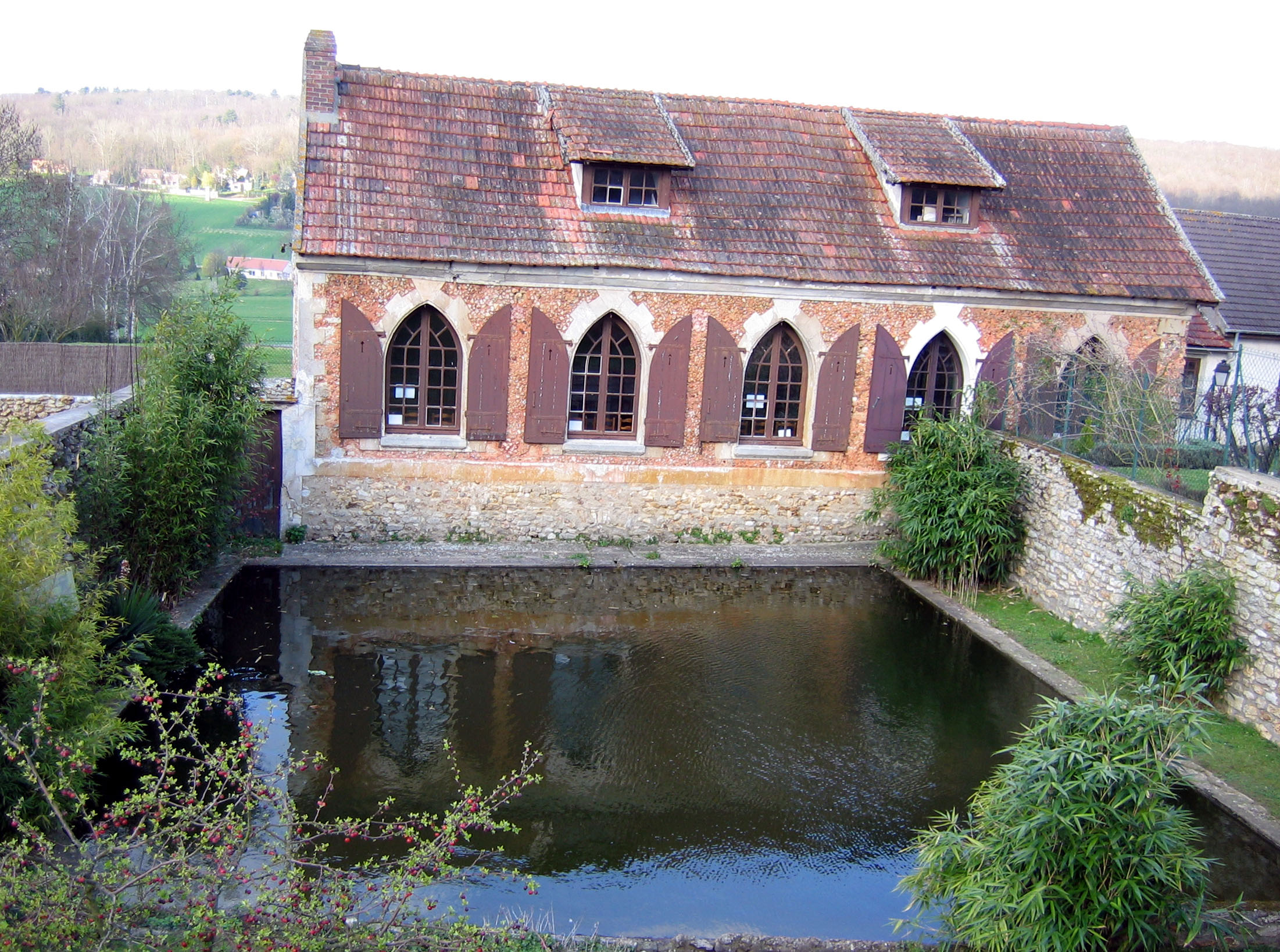
Lavoir

== See also ==
- Communes of the Yvelines department
