= Canton of Aubergenville =

Coordinates: 48.96°N 1.85°E

- Canton
- Location of the canton of Aubergenville in the Yvelines department.
- Country: France
- Region: Île-de-France
- Department: Yvelines
- No. of communes: {{{nbcomm}}}
- Area: 269.74 km^{2} (104.15 sq mi)
- Population (2023): 74,063
  - Density: 274.57/km^{2} (711.14/sq mi)
- INSEE code: 78 01

The canton of Aubergenville (French: Canton d'Aubergenville) is an administrative division of the Yvelines department, northern France. Its borders were modified at the French canton reorganisation which came into effect in March 2015. Its seat is in Aubergenville.

It consists of the following communes:

1. Andelu
2. Aubergenville
3. Aulnay-sur-Mauldre
4. Auteuil
5. Autouillet
6. Bazemont
7. Bazoches-sur-Guyonne
8. Béhoust
9. Boissy-sans-Avoir
10. Bouafle
11. Flexanville
12. Flins-sur-Seine
13. Galluis
14. Gambais
15. Garancières
16. Goupillières
17. Grosrouvre
18. Herbeville
19. Jouars-Pontchartrain
20. Marcq
21. Mareil-le-Guyon
22. Mareil-sur-Mauldre
23. Maule
24. Méré
25. Les Mesnuls
26. Millemont
27. Montainville
28. Montfort-l'Amaury
29. Neauphle-le-Château
30. Neauphle-le-Vieux
31. Nézel
32. La Queue-les-Yvelines
33. Saint-Germain-de-la-Grange
34. Saint-Rémy-l'Honoré
35. Saulx-Marchais
36. Thoiry
37. Le Tremblay-sur-Mauldre
38. Vicq
39. Villiers-le-Mahieu
40. Villiers-Saint-Frédéric
