= Herbeville =

- Commune
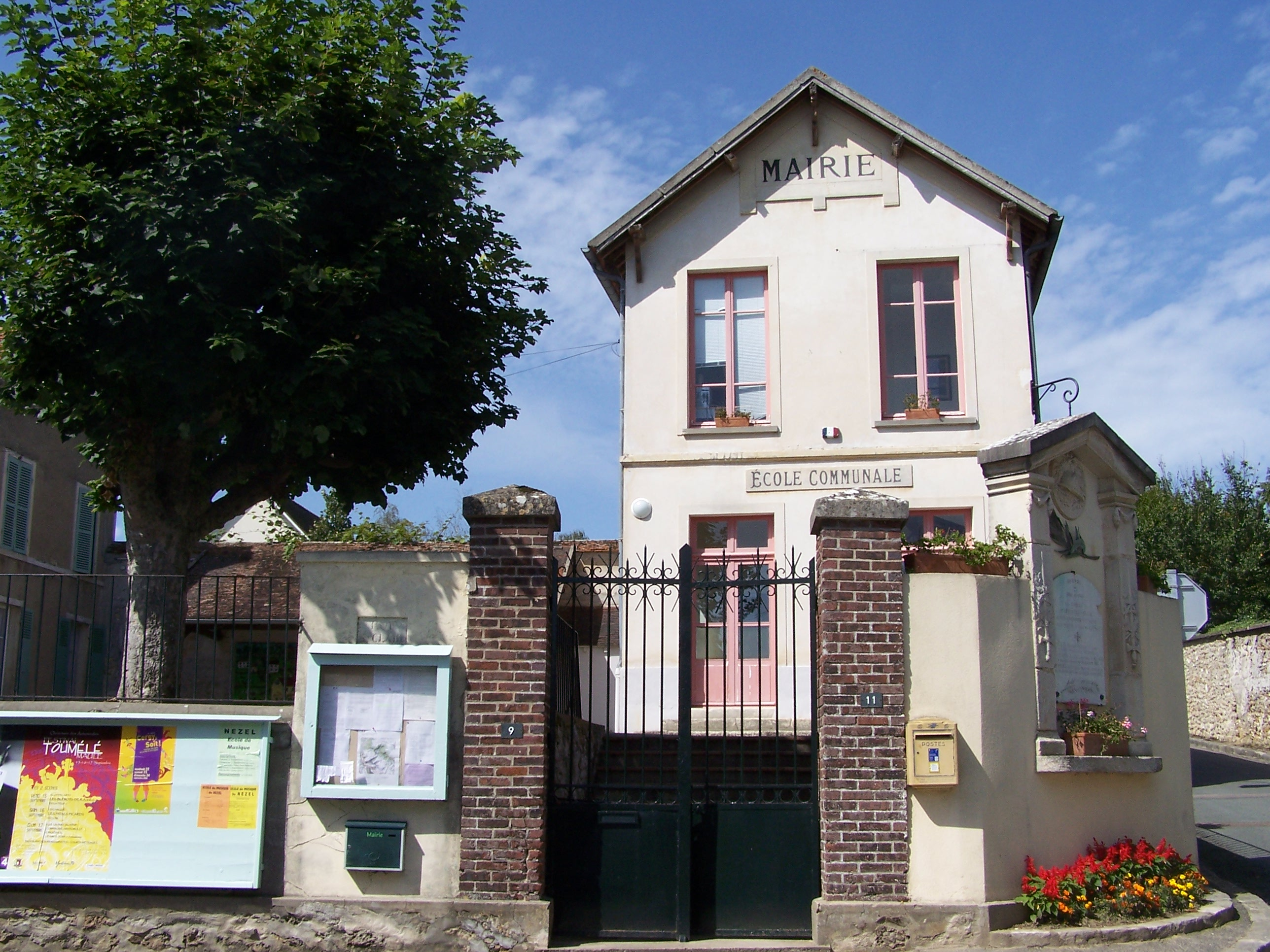
- Town hall
- Location of Herbeville
- Location within France Location within Île-de-France (region)
- Coordinates: 48°54′24″N 1°53′14″E
- Country: France
- Region: Île-de-France
- Department: Yvelines
- Arrondissement: Saint-Germain-en-Laye
- Canton: Aubergenville

Government
  - Mayor (2020–2026): Vincent Gay
- Area^{1}: 6.40 km^{2} (2.47 sq mi)
- Elevation: 137 m (449 ft)
- Highest elevation: 185 m (607 ft)
- Lowest elevation: 54 m (177 ft)
- Population (2023): 228
  - Density: 35.6/km^{2} (92.3/sq mi)
- Time zone: UTC+01:00 (CET)
  - Summer (DST): UTC+02:00 (CEST)
- INSEE/Postal code: 78305 /78580
- ^{1} French Land Register data, which excludes lakes, ponds, glaciers > 1 km^{2} (0.386 sq mi or 247 acres) and river estuaries.

Herbeville (French pronunciation: [ɛʁbəvil]) is a commune in the Yvelines department in the Île-de-France region in north-central France.

== See also ==
- Communes of the Yvelines department
