= Saint-Germain-de-la-Grange =

- Commune
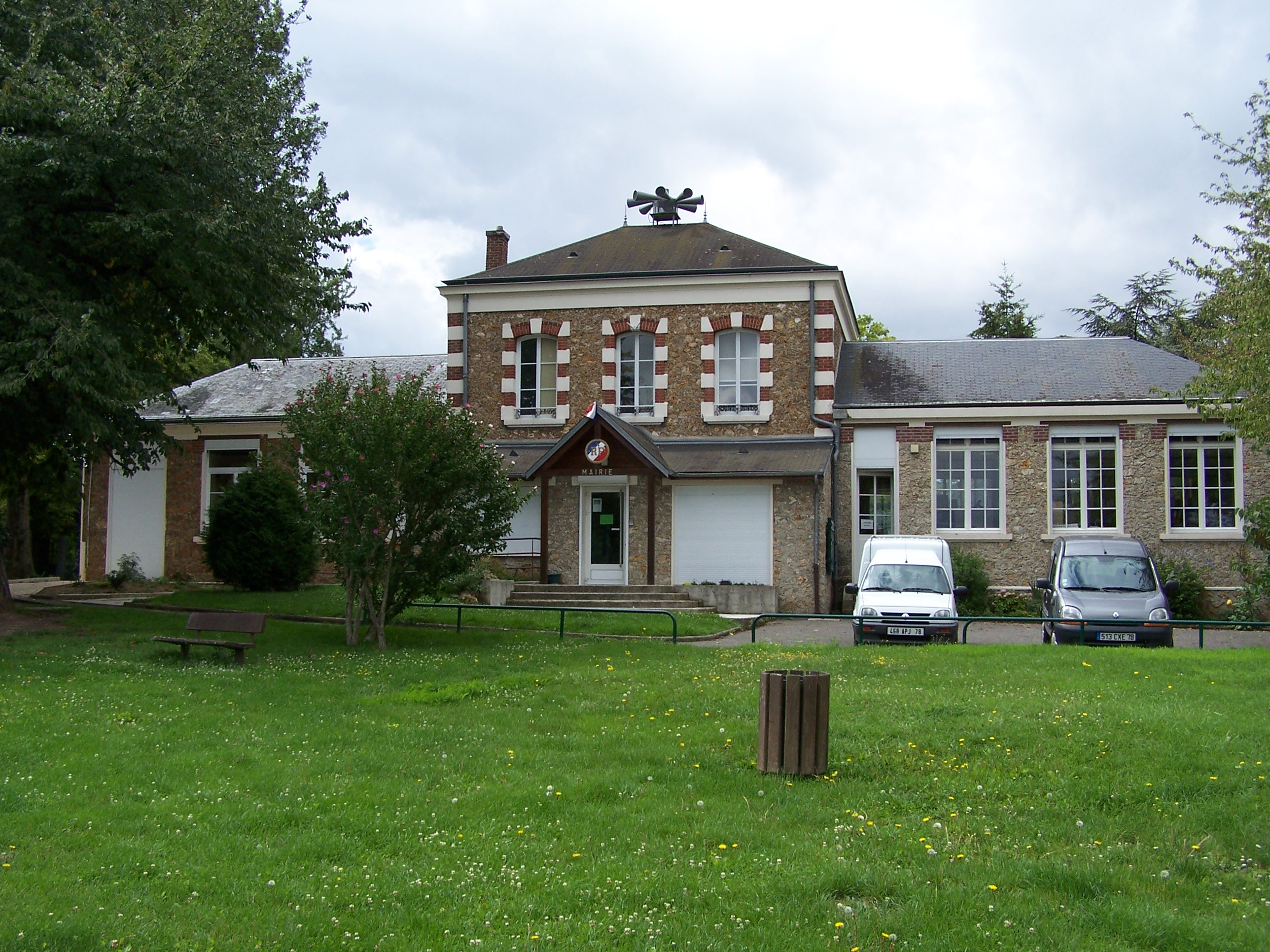
- Town hall
- Location of Saint-Germain-de-la-Grange
- Location within France Location within Île-de-France (region)
- Coordinates: 48°50′03″N 1°54′01″E
- Country: France
- Region: Île-de-France
- Department: Yvelines
- Arrondissement: Rambouillet
- Canton: Aubergenville
- Intercommunality: Cœur d'Yvelines

Government
  - Mayor (2020–2026): Bertrand Hauet
- Area^{1}: 5.23 km^{2} (2.02 sq mi)
- Elevation: 103 m (338 ft)
- Highest elevation: 170 m (560 ft)
- Lowest elevation: 57 m (187 ft)
- Population (2023): 1,847
  - Density: 353/km^{2} (915/sq mi)
- Time zone: UTC+01:00 (CET)
  - Summer (DST): UTC+02:00 (CEST)
- INSEE/Postal code: 78550 /78640
- ^{1} French Land Register data, which excludes lakes, ponds, glaciers > 1 km^{2} (0.386 sq mi or 247 acres) and river estuaries.

Saint-Germain-de-la-Grange (French pronunciation: [sɛ̃ ʒɛʁmɛ̃ də la ɡʁɑ̃ʒ]) is a commune in the Yvelines department in the Île-de-France region in north-central France.

== See also ==
- Communes of the Yvelines department
