= Villiers-Saint-Frédéric =

- Commune
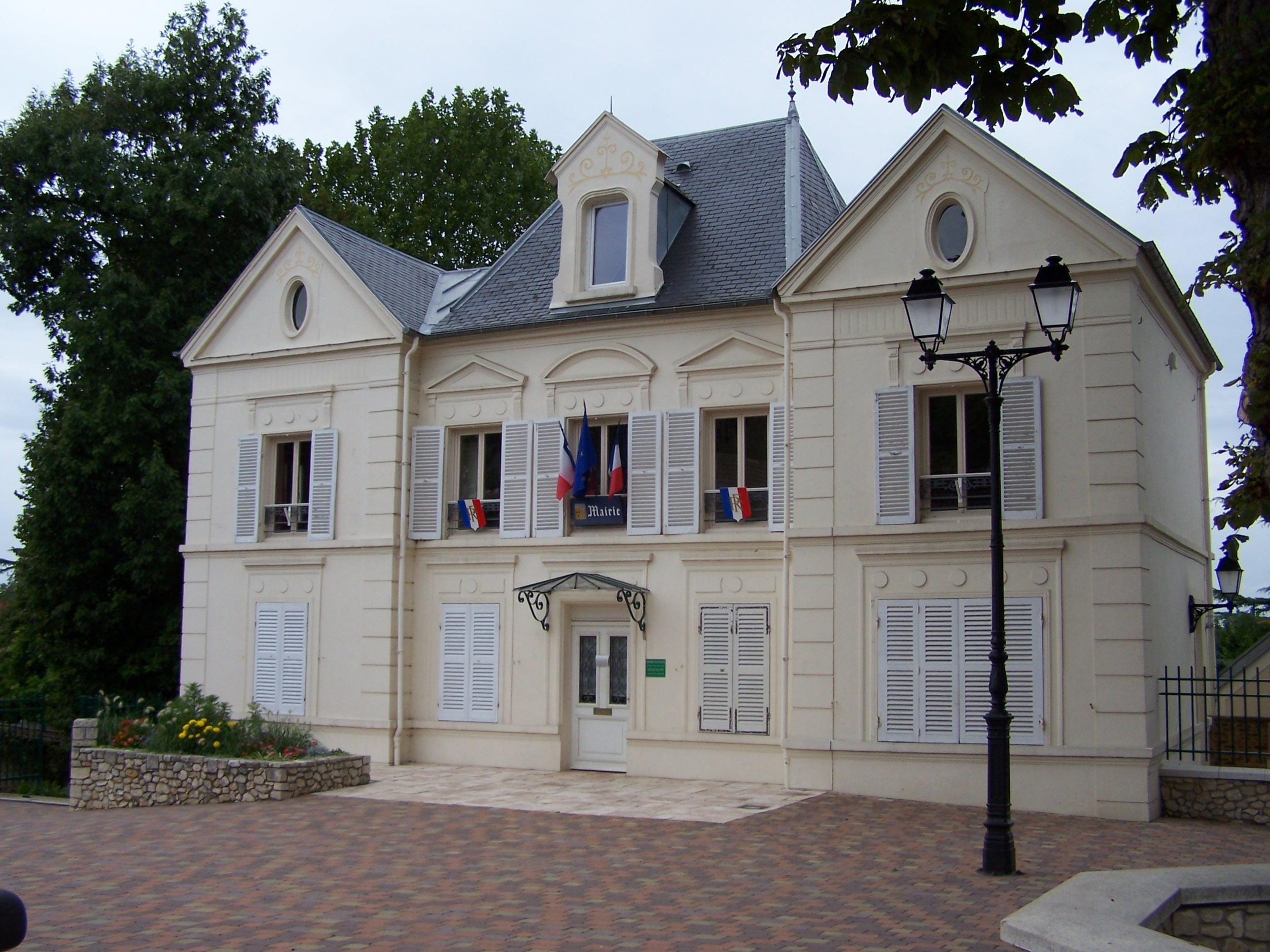
- Town hall

- Coat of arms
- Location of Villiers-Saint-Frédéric
- Location within France Location within Île-de-France (region)
- Coordinates: 48°49′16″N 1°53′24″E
- Country: France
- Region: Île-de-France
- Department: Yvelines
- Arrondissement: Rambouillet
- Canton: Aubergenville
- Intercommunality: Cœur d'Yvelines

Government
  - Mayor (2020–2026): Sylvain Durand
- Area^{1}: 5.06 km^{2} (1.95 sq mi)
- Elevation: 77 m (253 ft)
- Highest elevation: 171 m (561 ft)
- Lowest elevation: 53 m (174 ft)
- Population (2023): 3,395
  - Density: 671/km^{2} (1,740/sq mi)
- Time zone: UTC+01:00 (CET)
  - Summer (DST): UTC+02:00 (CEST)
- INSEE/Postal code: 78683 /78640
- ^{1} French Land Register data, which excludes lakes, ponds, glaciers > 1 km^{2} (0.386 sq mi or 247 acres) and river estuaries.

Villiers-Saint-Frédéric (French pronunciation: [vilje sɛ̃ fʁedeʁik]) is a commune in the Yvelines department in the Île-de-France region in north-central France.

It is known for having one of the largest Renault factories in France, where they produce tools and design new fittings for the vehicles.

The commune residents also store many films, warehoused at Rambouillet. In 1990, a fire broke out in the warehouse and many one-of-a-kind reels of film were destroyed.

== Population ==
Historical population
Year	Pop.	±% p.a.
1968	946	—
1975	1,198	+3.43%
1982	1,410	+2.35%
1990	2,306	+6.34%
1999	2,386	+0.38%
2007	2,718	+1.64%
2012	2,730	+0.09%
2017	2,838	+0.78%
2023	3,395	+3.03%
Source: INSEE

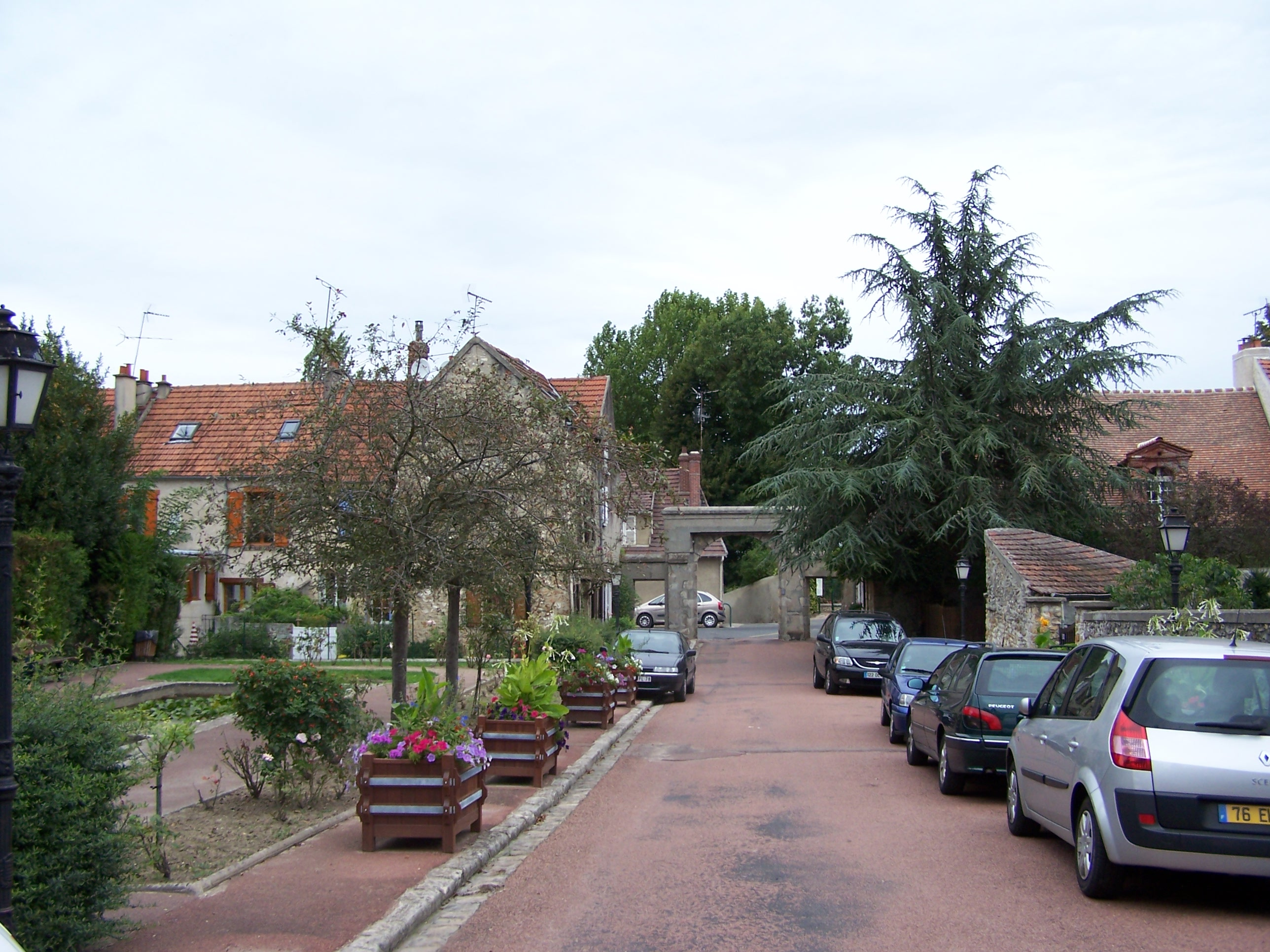
"Cour de la Ferme" in the centre of the village

== See also ==
- Communes of the Yvelines department
