= Neauphle-le-Vieux =

- Commune
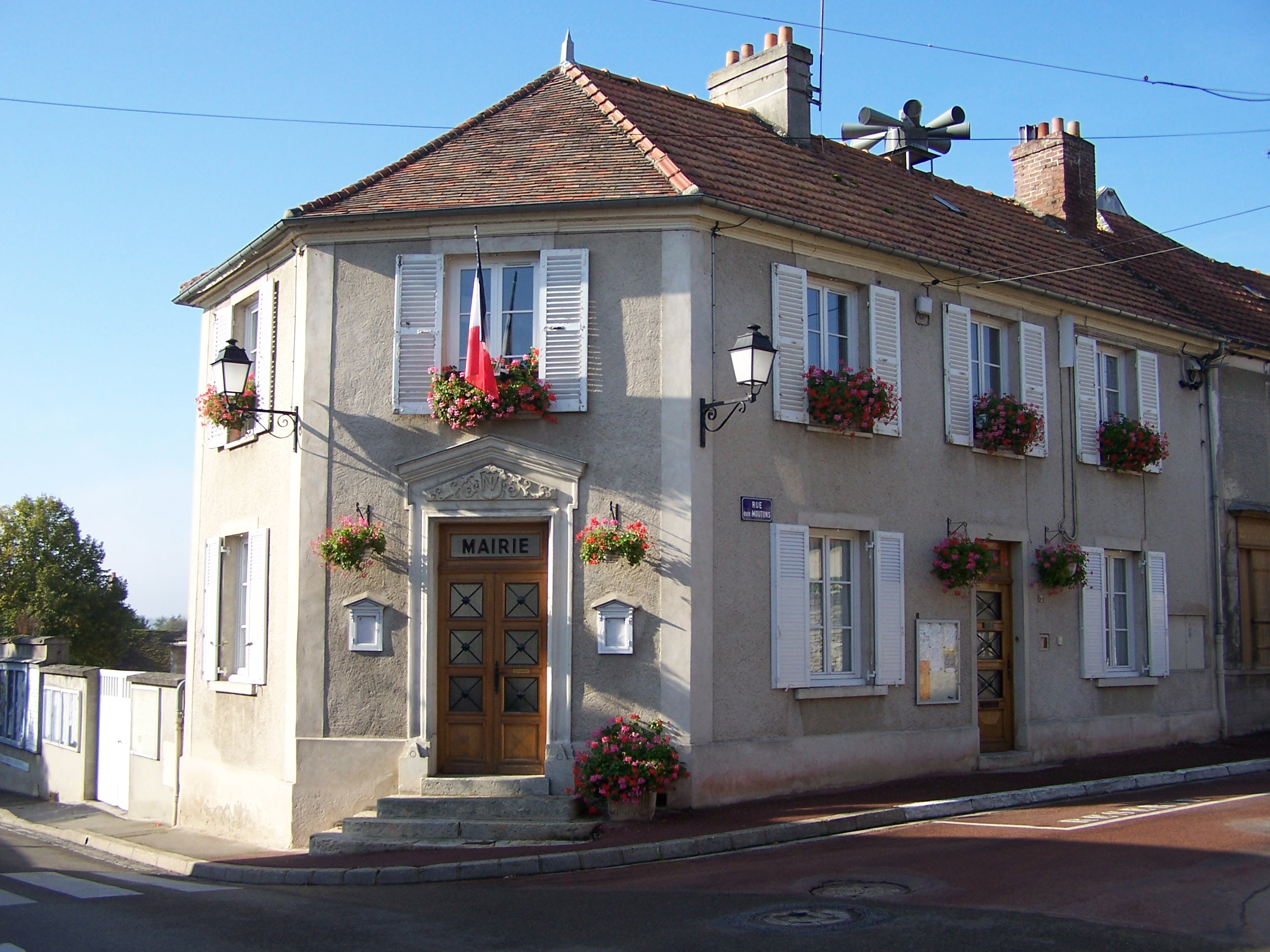
- Town hall

- Coat of arms
- Location of Neauphle-le-Vieux
- Location within France Location within Île-de-France (region)
- Coordinates: 48°48′59″N 1°51′49″E
- Country: France
- Region: Île-de-France
- Department: Yvelines
- Arrondissement: Rambouillet
- Canton: Aubergenville
- Intercommunality: CC Cœur d'Yvelines

Government
  - Mayor (2020–2026): Denise Planchon
- Area^{1}: 7.52 km^{2} (2.90 sq mi)
- Elevation: 83 m (272 ft)
- Highest elevation: 111 m (364 ft)
- Lowest elevation: 53 m (174 ft)
- Population (2023): 937
  - Density: 125/km^{2} (323/sq mi)
- Time zone: UTC+01:00 (CET)
  - Summer (DST): UTC+02:00 (CEST)
- INSEE/Postal code: 78443 /78640
- ^{1} French Land Register data, which excludes lakes, ponds, glaciers > 1 km^{2} (0.386 sq mi or 247 acres) and river estuaries.

Neauphle-le-Vieux (French: [nofl lə vjø]; lit. 'Neauphle-the-Old') is a commune in the Yvelines department in the Île-de-France region in north-central France.

== See also ==
- Communes of the Yvelines department
