= Andelu =

- Commune
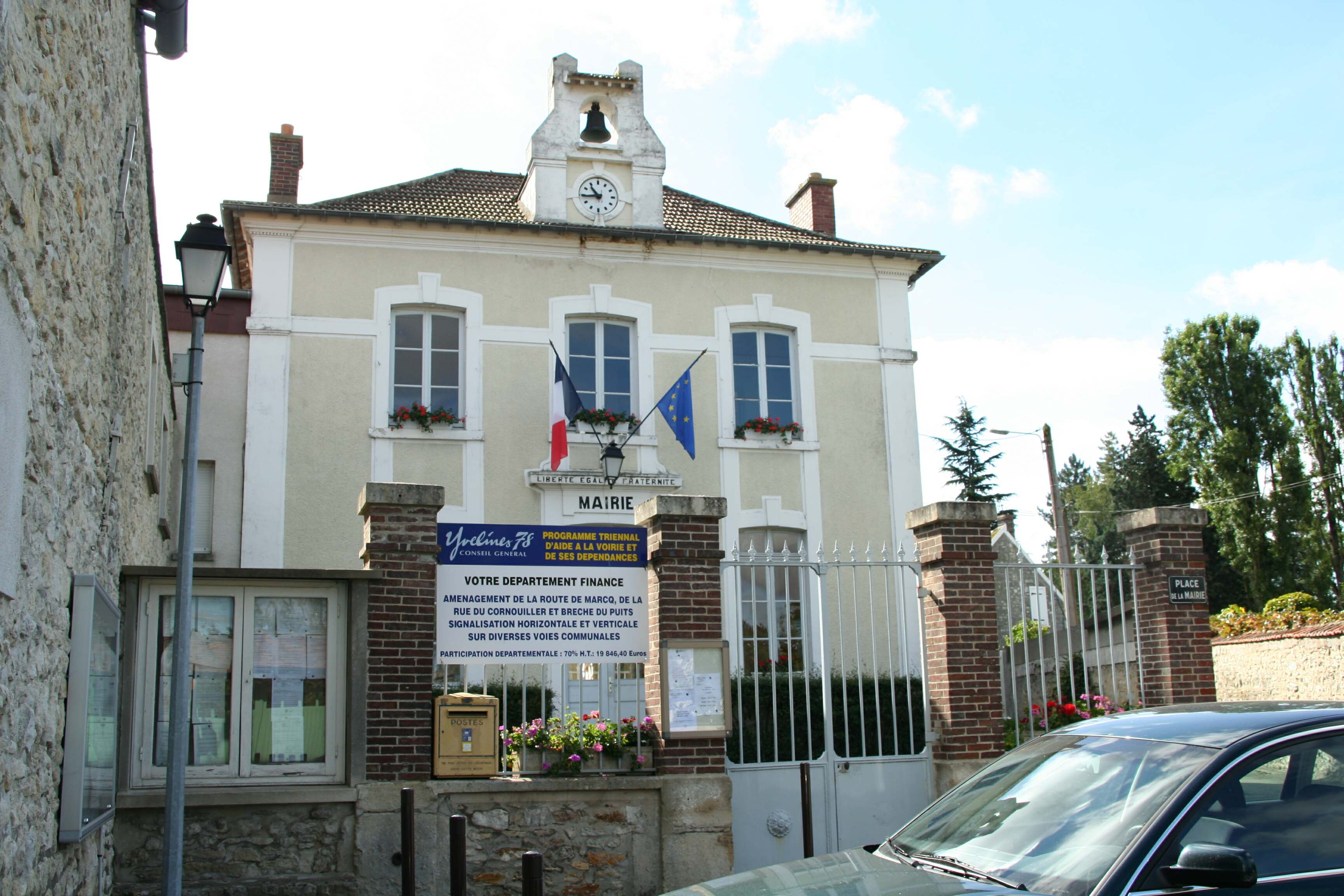
- Town hall

- Coat of arms
- Location of Andelu
- Location within France Location within Île-de-France (region)
- Coordinates: 48°52′52″N 1°49′30″E
- Country: France
- Region: Île-de-France
- Department: Yvelines
- Arrondissement: Saint-Germain-en-Laye
- Canton: Aubergenville
- Intercommunality: Gally Mauldre

Government
  - Mayor (2020–2026): Olivier Ravenel
- Area^{1}: 3.96 km^{2} (1.53 sq mi)
- Elevation: 119 m (390 ft)
- Highest elevation: 133 m (436 ft)
- Lowest elevation: 111 m (364 ft)
- Population (2023): 550
  - Density: 140/km^{2} (360/sq mi)
- Time zone: UTC+01:00 (CET)
  - Summer (DST): UTC+02:00 (CEST)
- INSEE/Postal code: 78013 /78770
- ^{1} French Land Register data, which excludes lakes, ponds, glaciers > 1 km^{2} (0.386 sq mi or 247 acres) and river estuaries.

Andelu (French pronunciation: [ɑ̃dly]) is a commune in the Yvelines department in north-central France.

== Population ==
Historical population
Year	Pop.	±% p.a.
1968	231	—
1975	246	+0.90%
1982	272	+1.45%
1990	346	+3.05%
1999	370	+0.75%
2007	474	+3.14%
2012	478	+0.17%
2017	476	−0.08%
2023	550	+2.44%
Source: INSEE

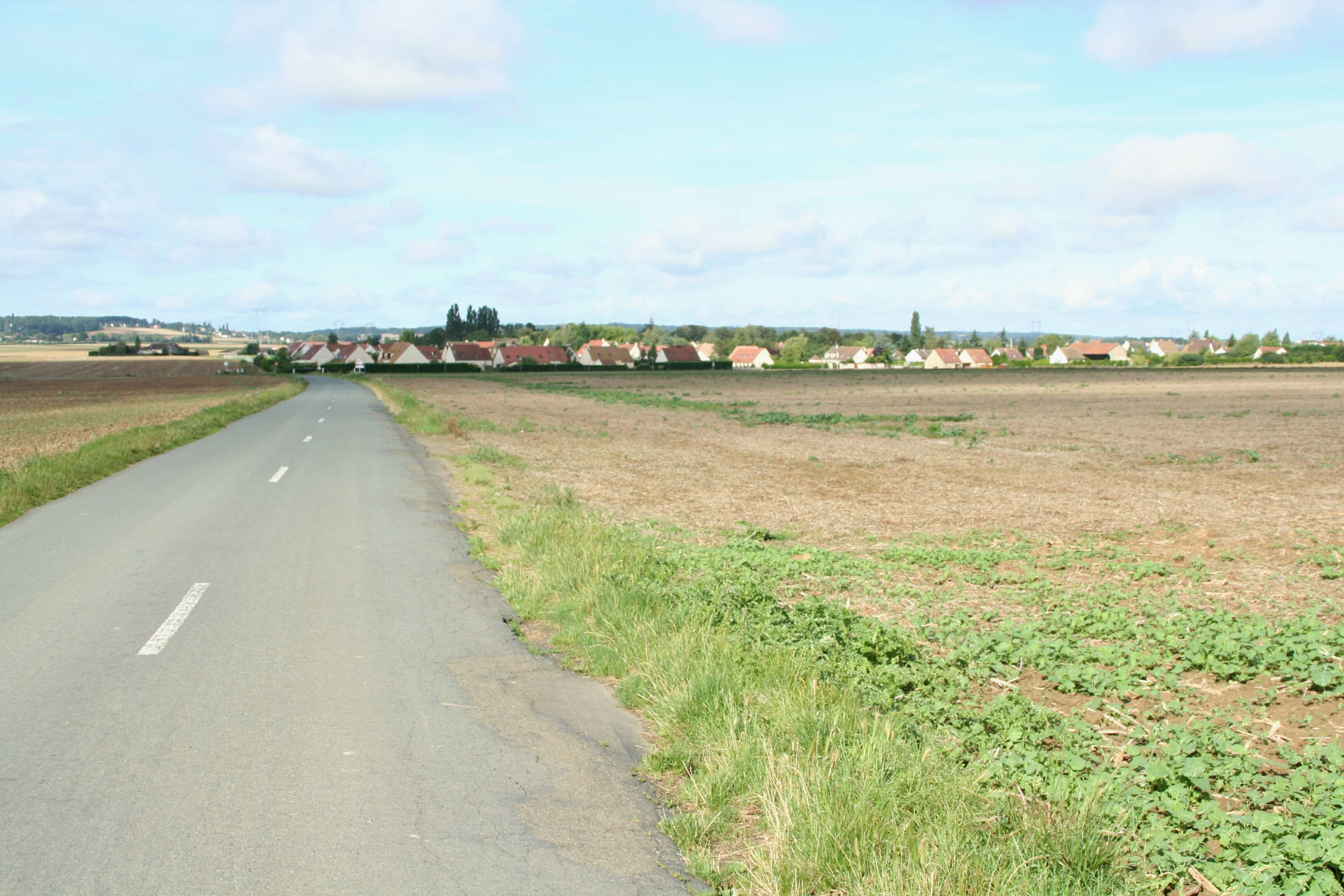
Approach

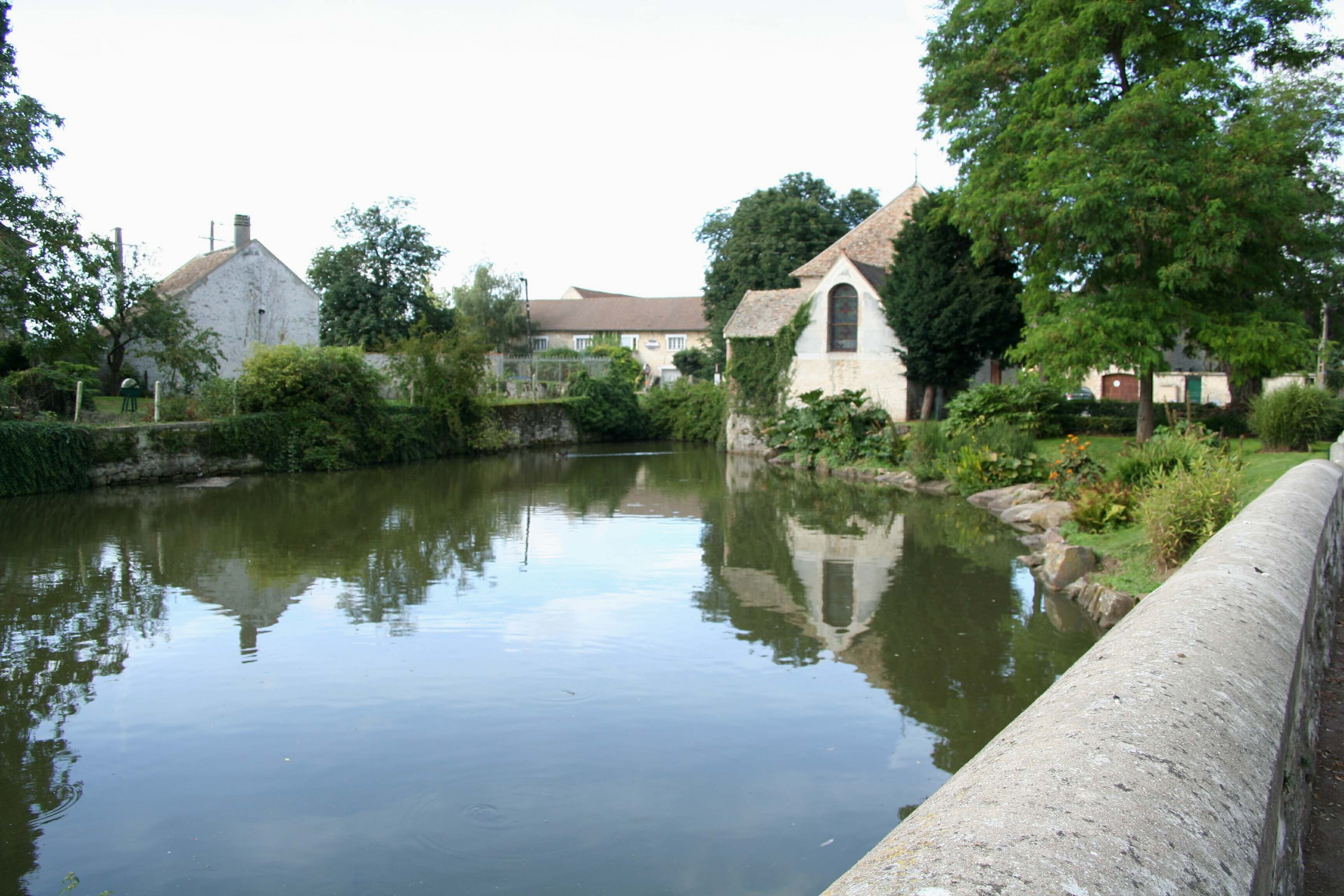
Pond and chapel

== See also ==
- Communes of the Yvelines department
