= Galluis =

- Commune
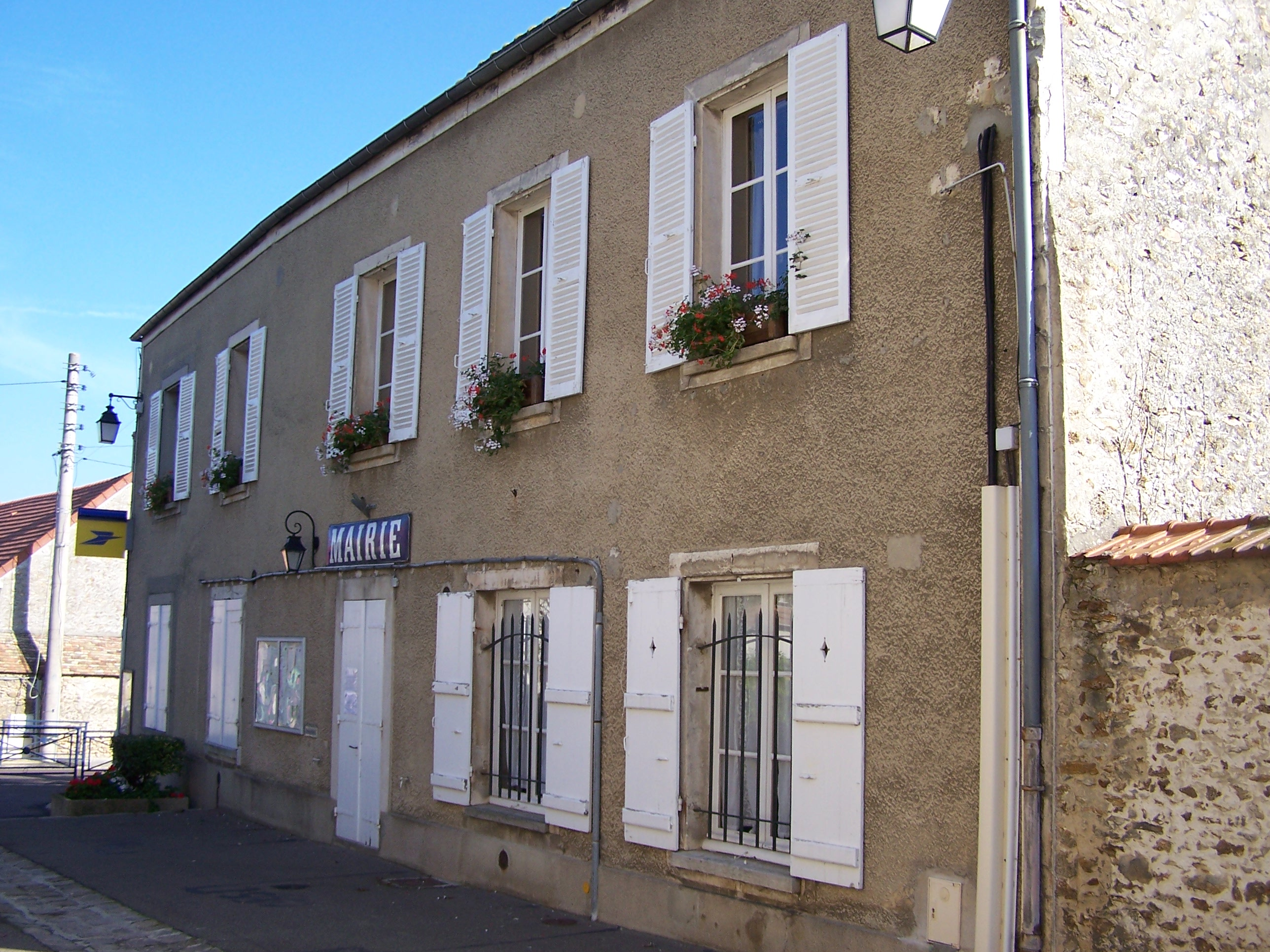
- Town hall

- Coat of arms
- Location of Galluis
- Location within France Location within Île-de-France (region)
- Coordinates: 48°47′47″N 1°47′39″E
- Country: France
- Region: Île-de-France
- Department: Yvelines
- Arrondissement: Rambouillet
- Canton: Aubergenville

Government
  - Mayor (2020–2026): Annie Gonthier
- Area^{1}: 4.52 km^{2} (1.75 sq mi)
- Elevation: 122 m (400 ft)
- Highest elevation: 183 m (600 ft)
- Lowest elevation: 85 m (279 ft)
- Population (2023): 1,298
  - Density: 287/km^{2} (744/sq mi)
- Time zone: UTC+01:00 (CET)
  - Summer (DST): UTC+02:00 (CEST)
- INSEE/Postal code: 78262 /78490
- ^{1} French Land Register data, which excludes lakes, ponds, glaciers > 1 km^{2} (0.386 sq mi or 247 acres) and river estuaries.

Galluis (French pronunciation: [ɡalɥi]) is a commune in the Yvelines department in the Île-de-France region in north-central France.

== History ==
The site has been inhabited since the Gallo-Roman epoch.

In 1883, the commune of La Queue-les-Yvelines was detached from Galluis with the dismemberment of the former commune of Galluis-la-Queue.

== Notable residents ==
Antoine-Germain Labarraque (1777 – 1850) was a French chemist and pharmacist, notable for formulating and finding important uses for "Eau de Labarraque" or "Labarraque's solution", a solution of sodium hypochlorite widely used as a disinfectant and deodoriser. He died in Gallius on 9 December 1850.

== See also ==
- Communes of the Yvelines department

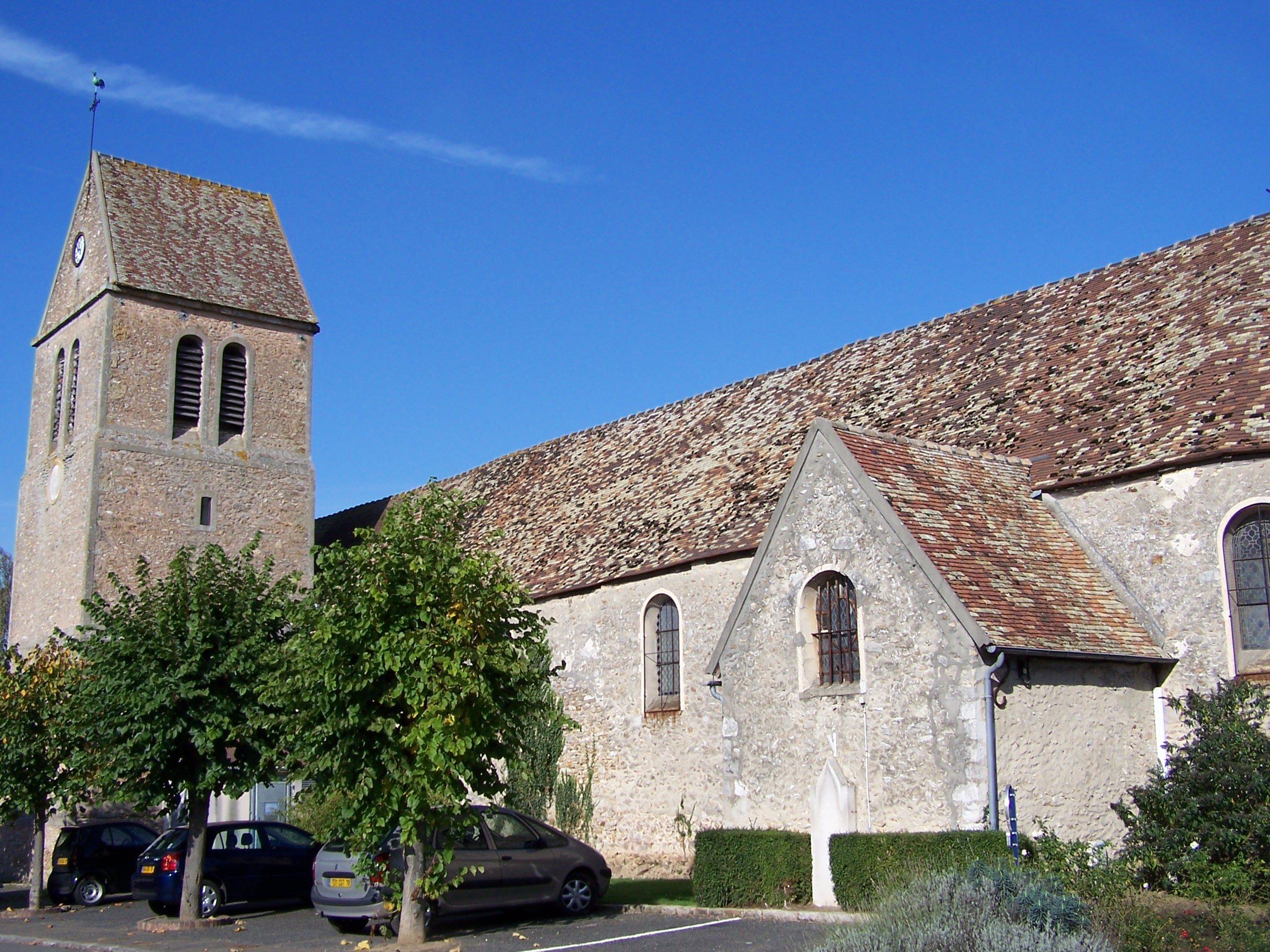
Saint-Martin
