= Vicq, Yvelines =

Vicq
- Commune
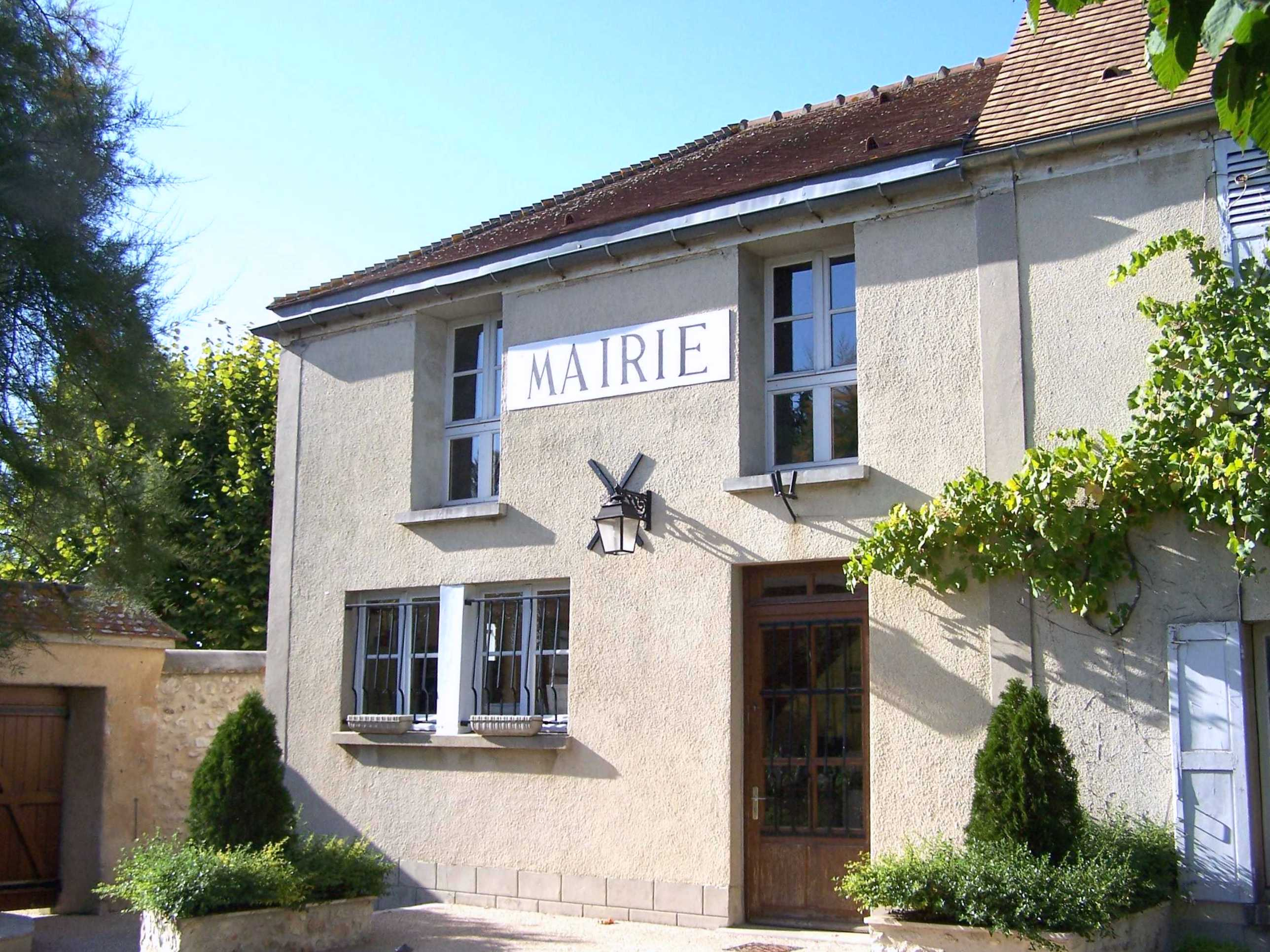
- Town hall
- Location of Vicq
- Location within France Location within Île-de-France (region)
- Coordinates: 48°48′58″N 1°50′08″E
- Country: France
- Region: Île-de-France
- Department: Yvelines
- Arrondissement: Rambouillet
- Canton: Aubergenville

Government
  - Mayor (2020–2026): Bernard Jacques
- Area^{1}: 4.43 km^{2} (1.71 sq mi)
- Elevation: 87 m (285 ft)
- Highest elevation: 110 m (360 ft)
- Lowest elevation: 62 m (203 ft)
- Population (2023): 389
  - Density: 87.8/km^{2} (227/sq mi)
- Time zone: UTC+01:00 (CET)
  - Summer (DST): UTC+02:00 (CEST)
- INSEE/Postal code: 78653 /78490
- ^{1} French Land Register data, which excludes lakes, ponds, glaciers > 1 km^{2} (0.386 sq mi or 247 acres) and river estuaries.

Vicq (French pronunciation: [vik]) is a commune in the Yvelines department in the Île-de-France in north-central France.

Location to the Musée d'Art Naïf de Vicq en Île-de-France, an art museum which was established in 1973. It is housed in the former residence of Max Fourny and his wife, Françoise Adnet, a figurative painter

== See also ==
- Communes of the Yvelines department
