= Mareil-sur-Mauldre =

- Commune
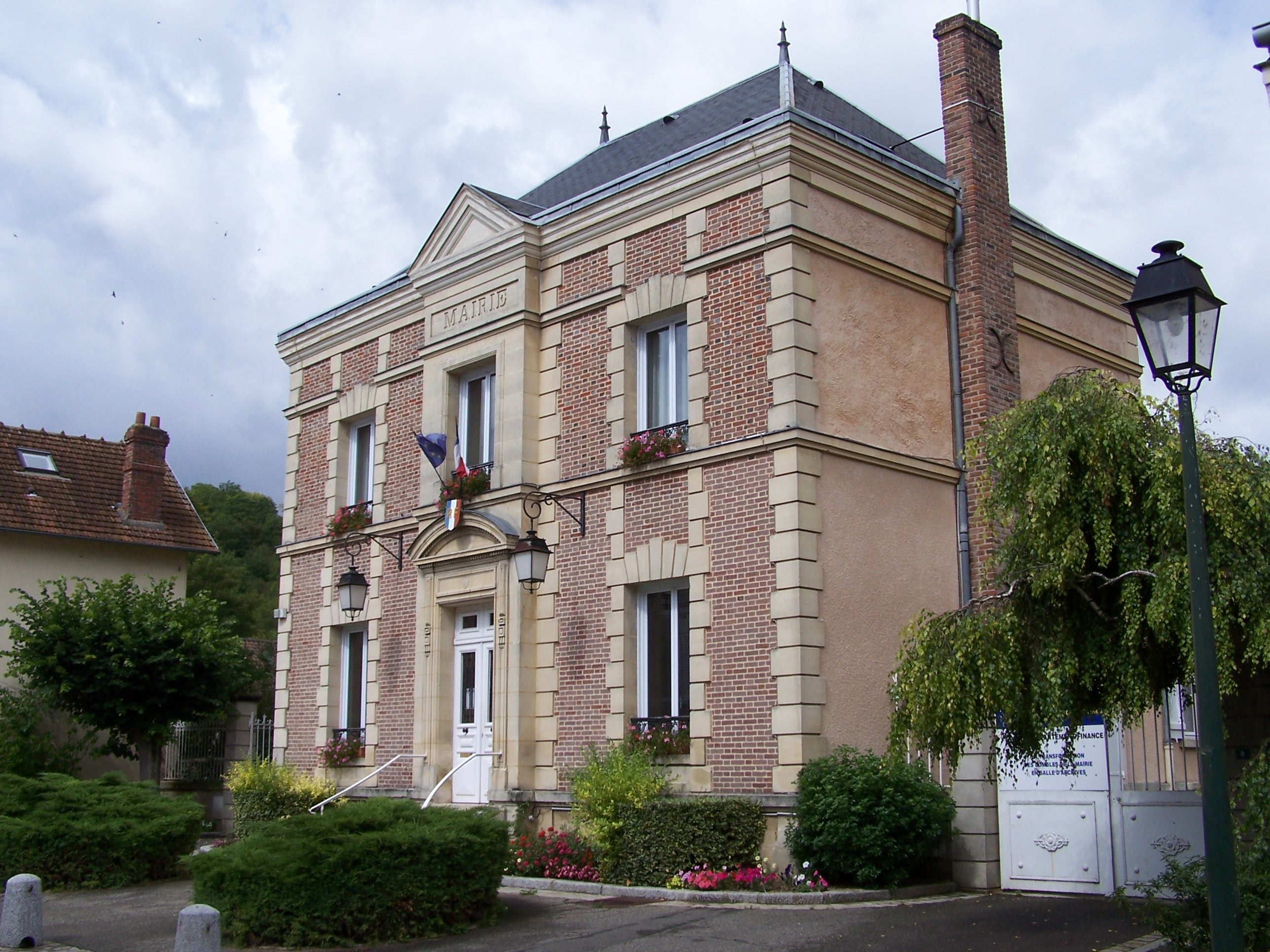
- Town hall

- Coat of arms
- Location of Mareil-sur-Mauldre
- Location within France Location within Île-de-France (region)
- Coordinates: 48°53′44″N 1°52′12″E
- Country: France
- Region: Île-de-France
- Department: Yvelines
- Arrondissement: Saint-Germain-en-Laye
- Canton: Aubergenville

Government
  - Mayor (2020–2026): Nathalie Cahuzac
- Area^{1}: 4.33 km^{2} (1.67 sq mi)
- Elevation: 47 m (154 ft)
- Highest elevation: 127 m (417 ft)
- Lowest elevation: 34 m (112 ft)
- Population (2023): 1,776
  - Density: 410/km^{2} (1,060/sq mi)
- Time zone: UTC+01:00 (CET)
  - Summer (DST): UTC+02:00 (CEST)
- INSEE/Postal code: 78368 /78124
- ^{1} French Land Register data, which excludes lakes, ponds, glaciers > 1 km^{2} (0.386 sq mi or 247 acres) and river estuaries.

Mareil-sur-Mauldre (French pronunciation: [maʁɛj syʁ moldʁ], literally Mareil on Mauldre) is a commune in the Yvelines department in the Île-de-France region in north-central France.

== See also ==
- Communes of the Yvelines department
