= Méré, Yvelines =

Méré
- Commune
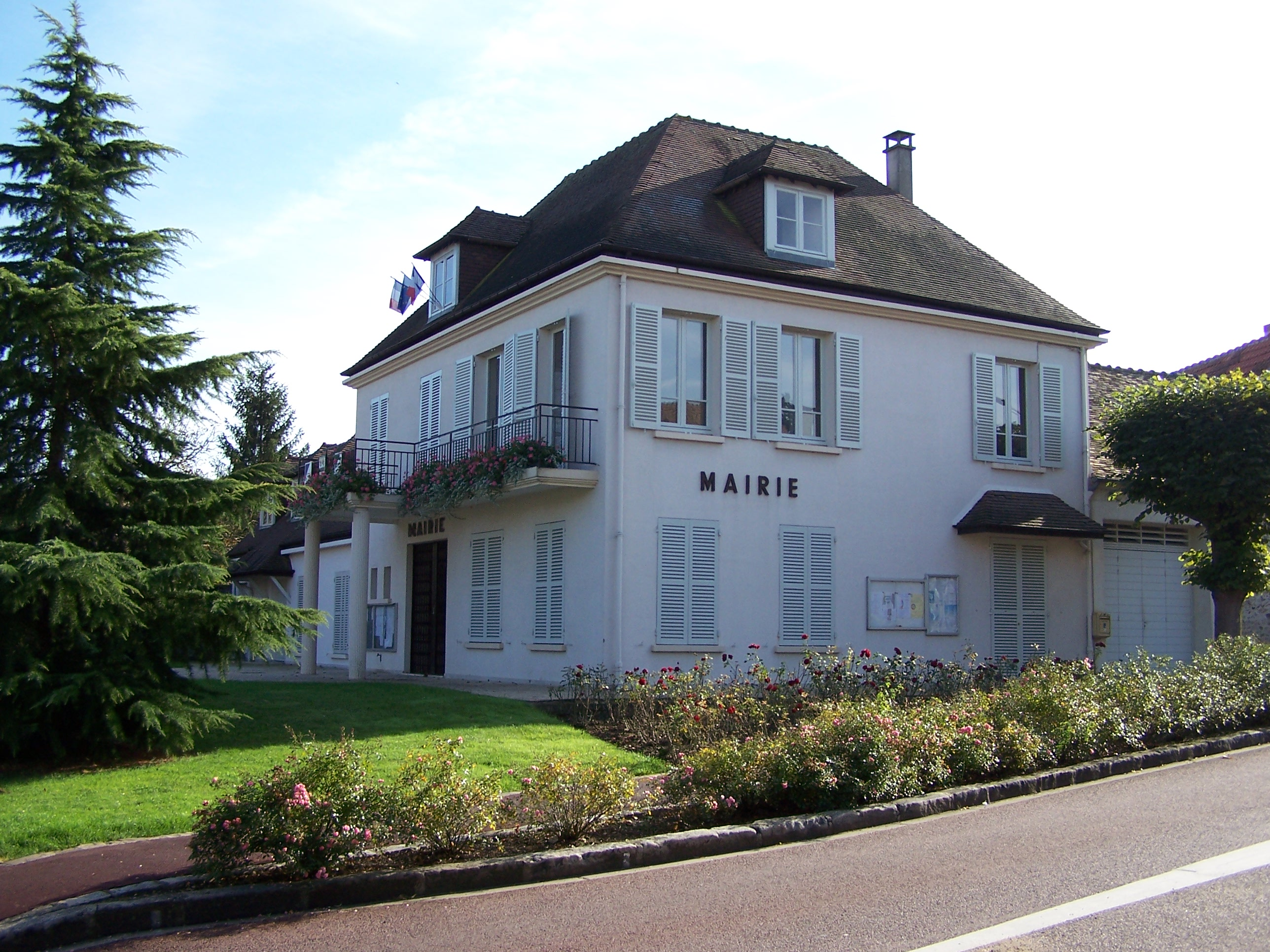
- Town hall

- Coat of arms
- Location of Méré
- Location within France Location within Île-de-France (region)
- Coordinates: 48°47′13″N 1°49′06″E
- Country: France
- Region: Île-de-France
- Department: Yvelines
- Arrondissement: Rambouillet
- Canton: Aubergenville

Government
  - Mayor (2020–2026): Michel Recoussines
- Area^{1}: 10.32 km^{2} (3.98 sq mi)
- Elevation: 150 m (490 ft)
- Highest elevation: 184 m (604 ft)
- Lowest elevation: 65 m (213 ft)
- Population (2023): 1,731
  - Density: 167.7/km^{2} (434.4/sq mi)
- Time zone: UTC+01:00 (CET)
  - Summer (DST): UTC+02:00 (CEST)
- INSEE/Postal code: 78389 /78490
- ^{1} French Land Register data, which excludes lakes, ponds, glaciers > 1 km^{2} (0.386 sq mi or 247 acres) and river estuaries.

Méré (French pronunciation: [meʁe]) is a commune in the Yvelines department in the Île-de-France region in north-central France. François Quesnay a Physiocrat and one of the first to attempt to establish a rational science of economics, was born in Méré.

== See also ==
- Communes of the Yvelines department
