= Boissy-sans-Avoir =

- Commune
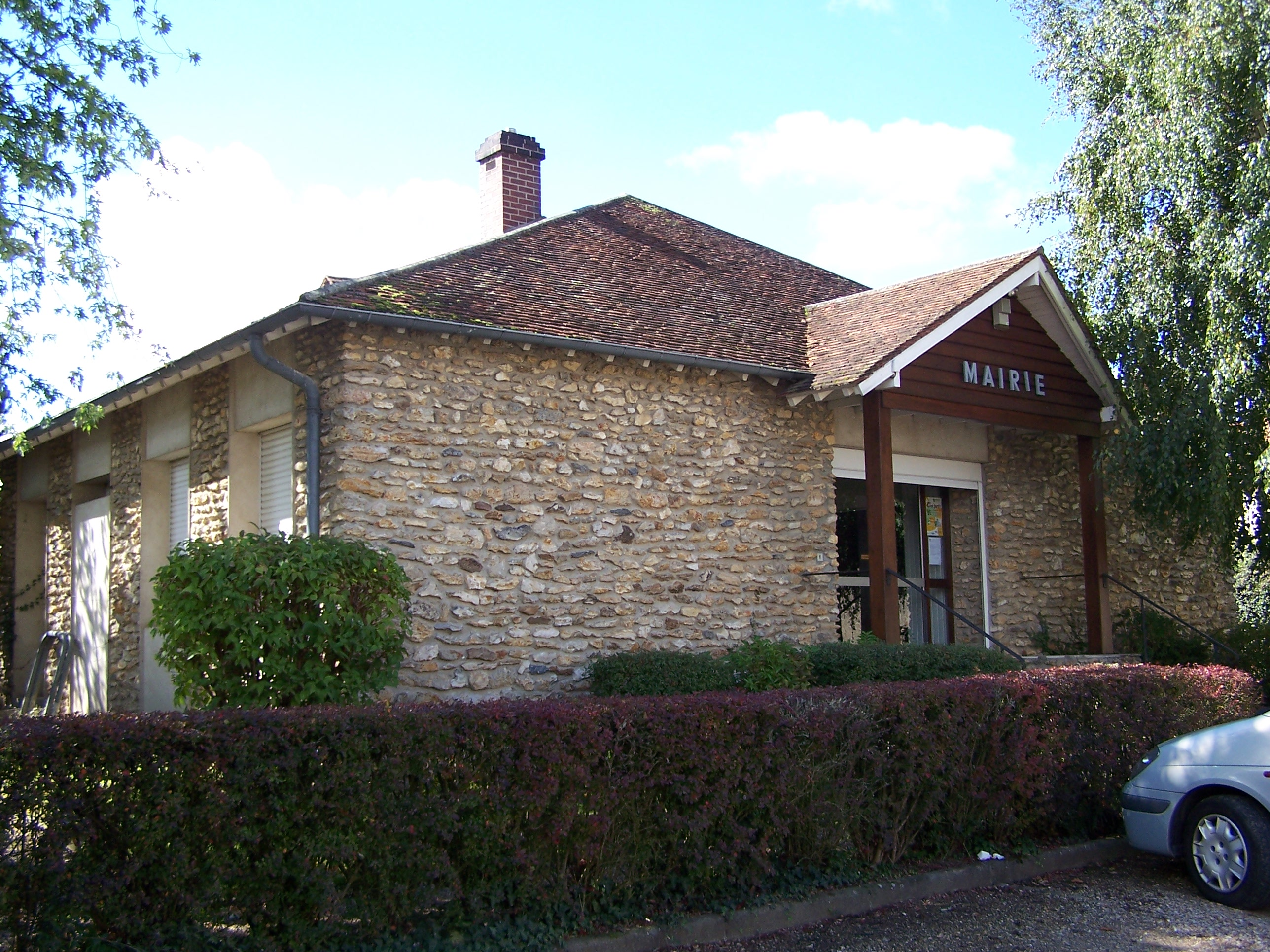
- Town hall

- Coat of arms
- Location of Boissy-sans-Avoir
- Location within France Location within Île-de-France (region)
- Coordinates: 48°49′16″N 1°47′40″E
- Country: France
- Region: Île-de-France
- Department: Yvelines
- Arrondissement: Rambouillet
- Canton: Aubergenville

Government
  - Mayor (2020–2026): Grégoire Corby
- Area^{1}: 3.96 km^{2} (1.53 sq mi)
- Elevation: 95 m (312 ft)
- Highest elevation: 116 m (381 ft)
- Lowest elevation: 77 m (253 ft)
- Population (2023): 616
  - Density: 156/km^{2} (403/sq mi)
- Time zone: UTC+01:00 (CET)
  - Summer (DST): UTC+02:00 (CEST)
- INSEE/Postal code: 78084 /78490
- ^{1} French Land Register data, which excludes lakes, ponds, glaciers > 1 km^{2} (0.386 sq mi or 247 acres) and river estuaries.

Boissy-sans-Avoir (French pronunciation: [bwasi sɑ̃z‿avwaʁ]) is a commune in the Yvelines department in northern France.

It is the burial place of actress Romy Schneider (1938–1982) and her son David (1966–1981).

== See also ==
- Communes of the Yvelines department
