= Villiers-le-Mahieu =

- Commune
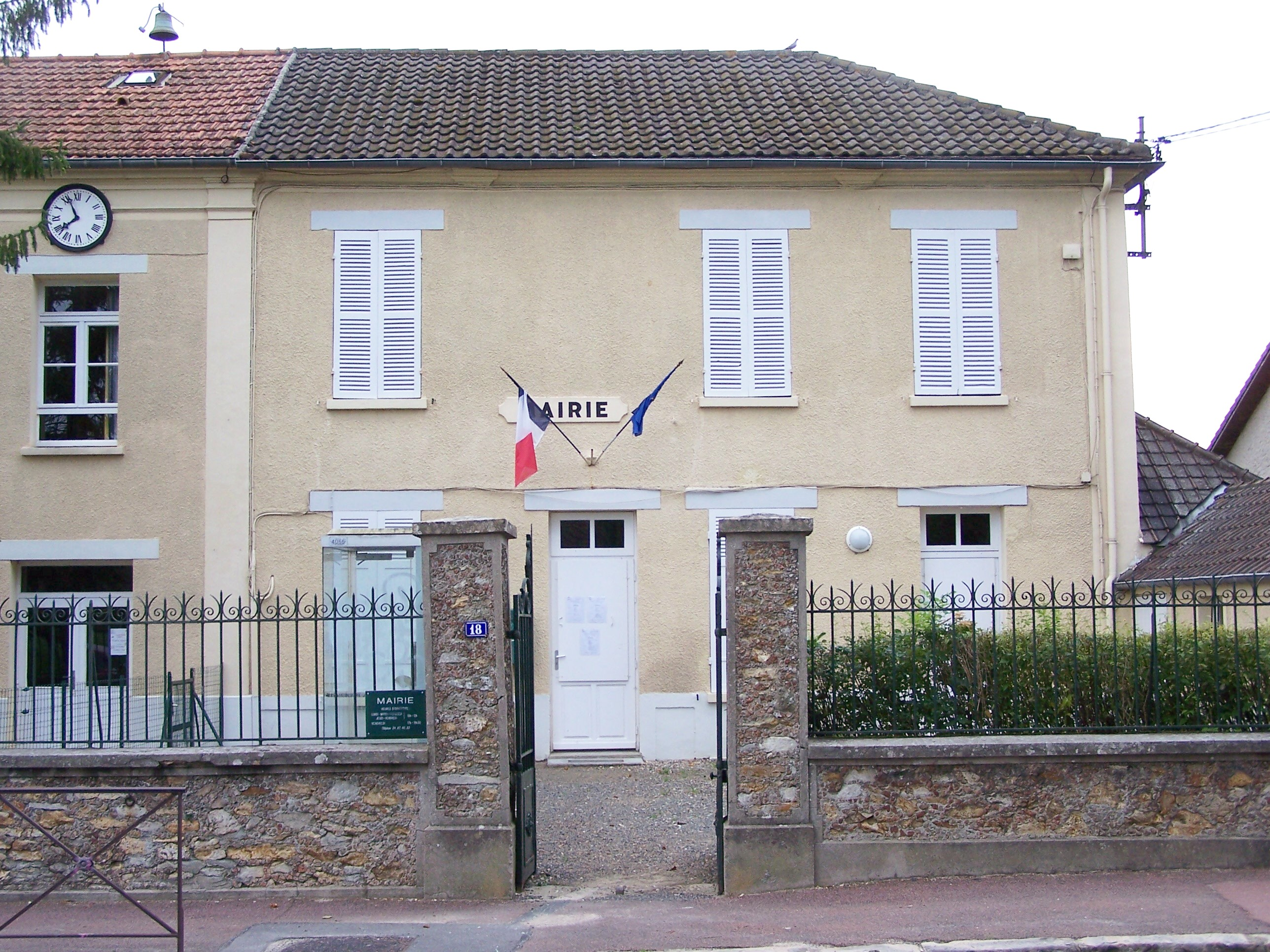
- Town hall
- Location of Villiers-le-Mahieu
- Location within France Location within Île-de-France (region)
- Coordinates: 48°51′38″N 1°46′24″E
- Country: France
- Region: Île-de-France
- Department: Yvelines
- Arrondissement: Rambouillet
- Canton: Aubergenville

Government
  - Mayor (2023–2026): Patrick Bourdeaux
- Area^{1}: 6.77 km^{2} (2.61 sq mi)
- Elevation: 127 m (417 ft)
- Highest elevation: 169 m (554 ft)
- Lowest elevation: 53 m (174 ft)
- Population (2023): 888
  - Density: 131/km^{2} (340/sq mi)
- Time zone: UTC+01:00 (CET)
  - Summer (DST): UTC+02:00 (CEST)
- INSEE/Postal code: 78681 /78770
- ^{1} French Land Register data, which excludes lakes, ponds, glaciers > 1 km^{2} (0.386 sq mi or 247 acres) and river estuaries.

Villiers-le-Mahieu (French pronunciation: [vilje lə majø]) is a commune in the Yvelines département in the Île-de-France region in north-central France.

== Monuments ==
- Château de Villiers-le-Mahieu: 13th century castle, rebuilt in the 17th century and now a luxury hotel.

== See also ==
- Communes of the Yvelines department
