= Garancières =

- Commune
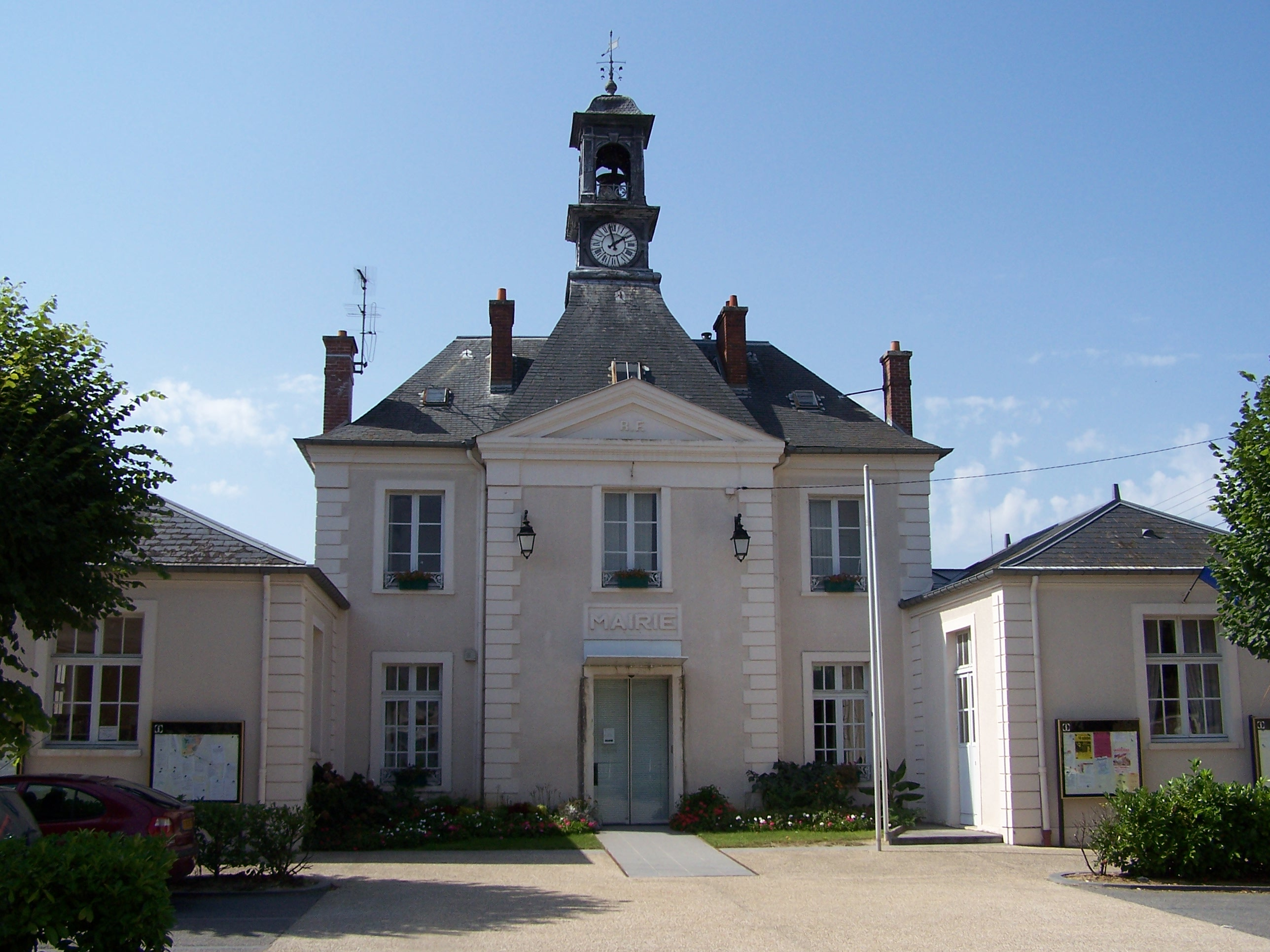
- Town hall

- Coat of arms
- Location of Garancières
- Location within France Location within Île-de-France (region)
- Coordinates: 48°49′21″N 1°45′20″E
- Country: France
- Region: Île-de-France
- Department: Yvelines
- Arrondissement: Rambouillet
- Canton: Aubergenville

Government
  - Mayor (2024–2026): Ghislaine Lesade
- Area^{1}: 10.69 km^{2} (4.13 sq mi)
- Elevation: 101 m (331 ft)
- Highest elevation: 188 m (617 ft)
- Lowest elevation: 87 m (285 ft)
- Population (2023): 2,621
  - Density: 245.2/km^{2} (635.0/sq mi)
- Time zone: UTC+01:00 (CET)
  - Summer (DST): UTC+02:00 (CEST)
- INSEE/Postal code: 78265 /78890
- ^{1} French Land Register data, which excludes lakes, ponds, glaciers > 1 km^{2} (0.386 sq mi or 247 acres) and river estuaries.

Garancières (French pronunciation: [ɡaʁɑ̃sjɛʁ]) is a commune in the Yvelines department in the Île-de-France region in north-central France.

== Population ==
Historical population
Year	Pop.	±% p.a.
1968	1,025	—
1975	1,193	+2.19%
1982	1,392	+2.23%
1990	1,923	+4.12%
1999	2,242	+1.72%
2007	2,324	+0.45%
2012	2,382	+0.49%
2017	2,348	−0.29%
2023	2,621	+1.85%
Source: INSEE

== See also ==
- Communes of the Yvelines department
