= Flexanville =

- Commune
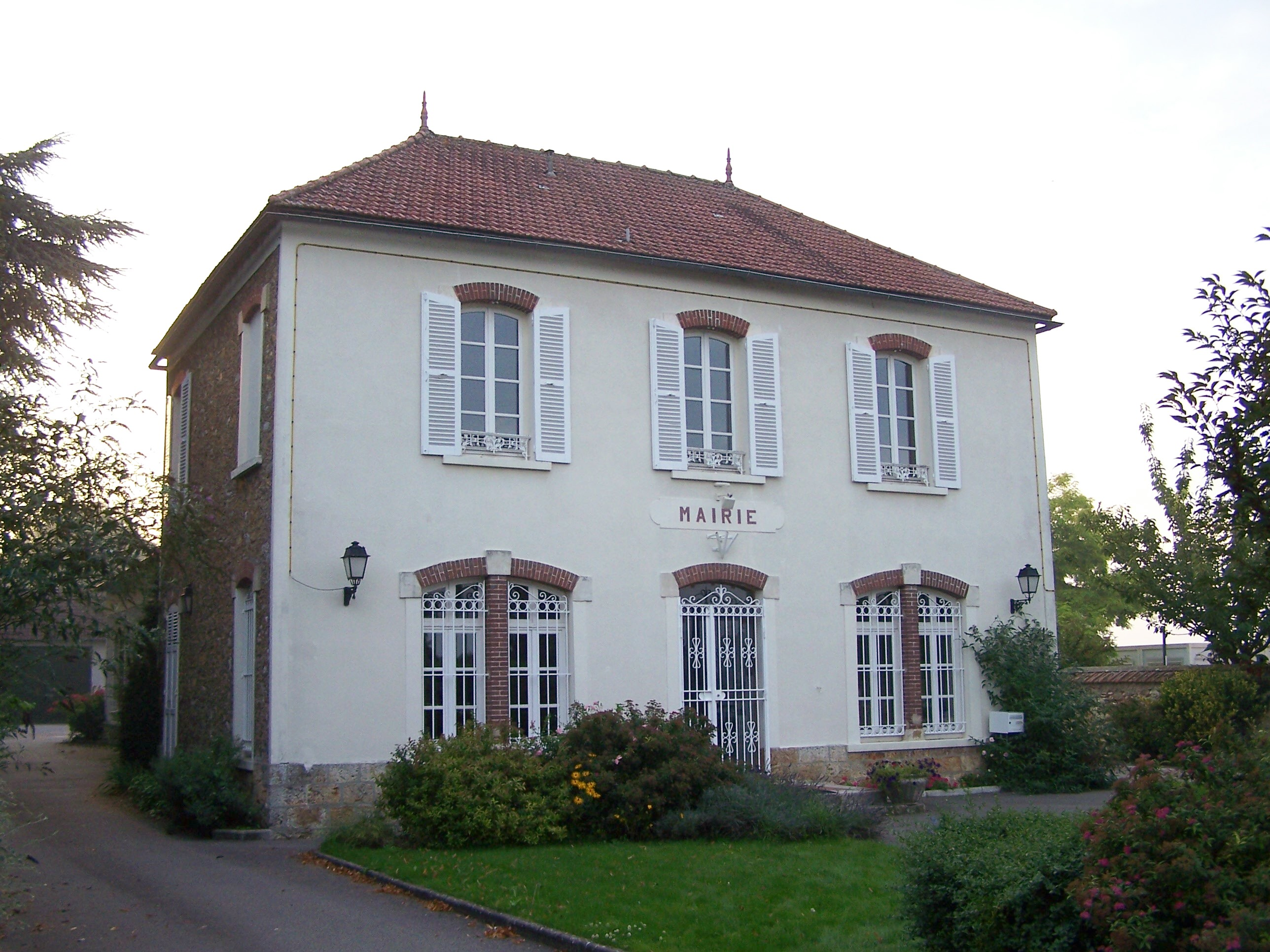
- Town hall
- Location of Flexanville
- Location within France Location within Île-de-France (region)
- Coordinates: 48°51′17″N 1°44′19″E
- Country: France
- Region: Île-de-France
- Department: Yvelines
- Arrondissement: Rambouillet
- Canton: Aubergenville

Government
  - Mayor (2020–2026): Didier Saussay
- Area^{1}: 8.89 km^{2} (3.43 sq mi)
- Elevation: 121 m (397 ft)
- Highest elevation: 140 m (460 ft)
- Lowest elevation: 95 m (312 ft)
- Population (2023): 576
  - Density: 64.8/km^{2} (168/sq mi)
- Time zone: UTC+01:00 (CET)
  - Summer (DST): UTC+02:00 (CEST)
- INSEE/Postal code: 78236 /78910
- ^{1} French Land Register data, which excludes lakes, ponds, glaciers > 1 km^{2} (0.386 sq mi or 247 acres) and river estuaries.

Flexanville (French pronunciation: [flɛksɑ̃vil]) is a commune in the Yvelines department in the Île-de-France region of north-central France.

== River ==
The commune shares its name with a small river that passes through it, la Flexanville. This waterway flows through eight other communes for a total distance of 11.1 kilometres (6.9 mi). The Flexanville is a tributary of the Vaucouleurs which in turn empties into the Seine.

== Views ==
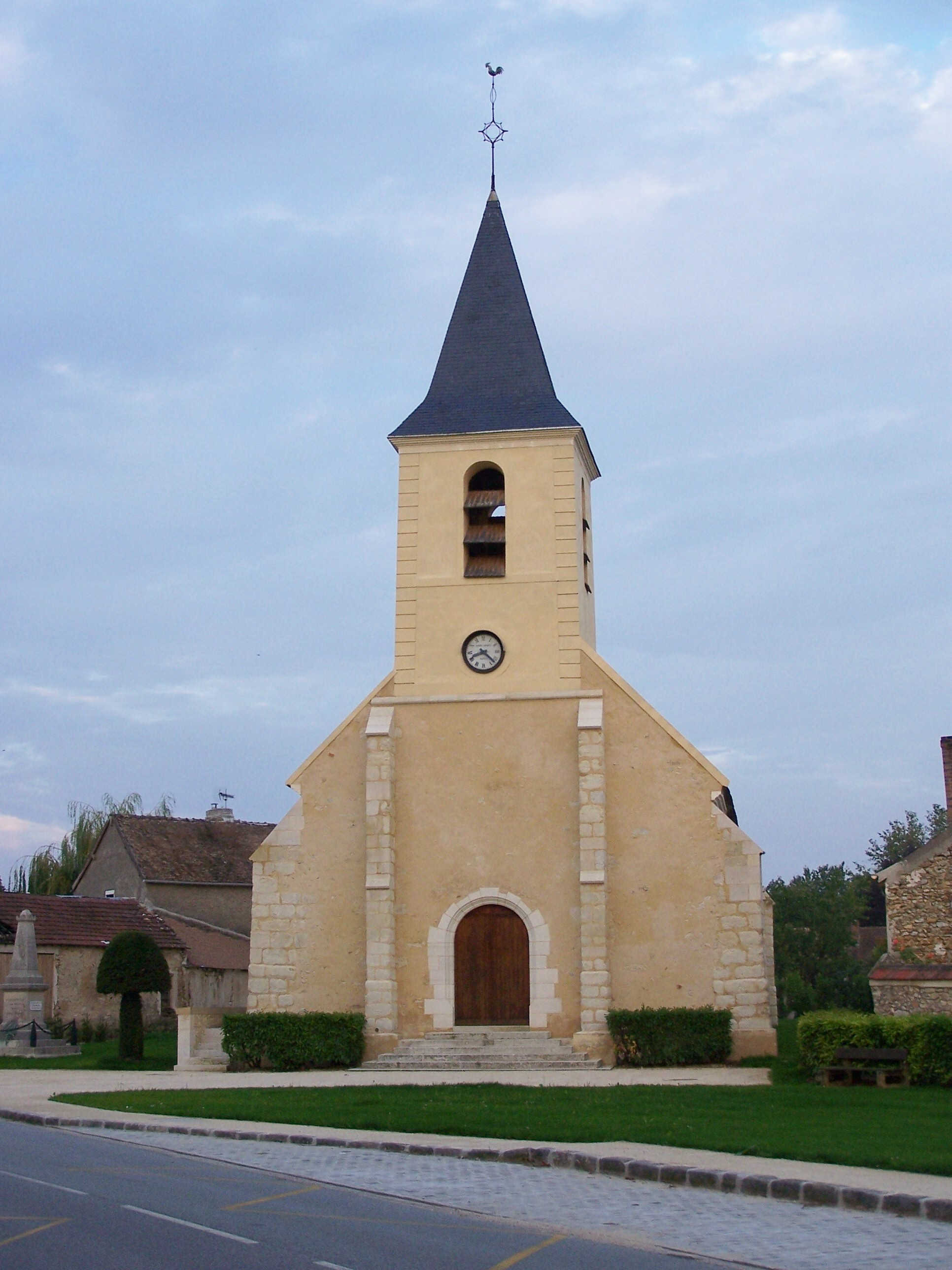
Local church

== See also ==
- Communes of the Yvelines department
