= Millemont =

- Commune
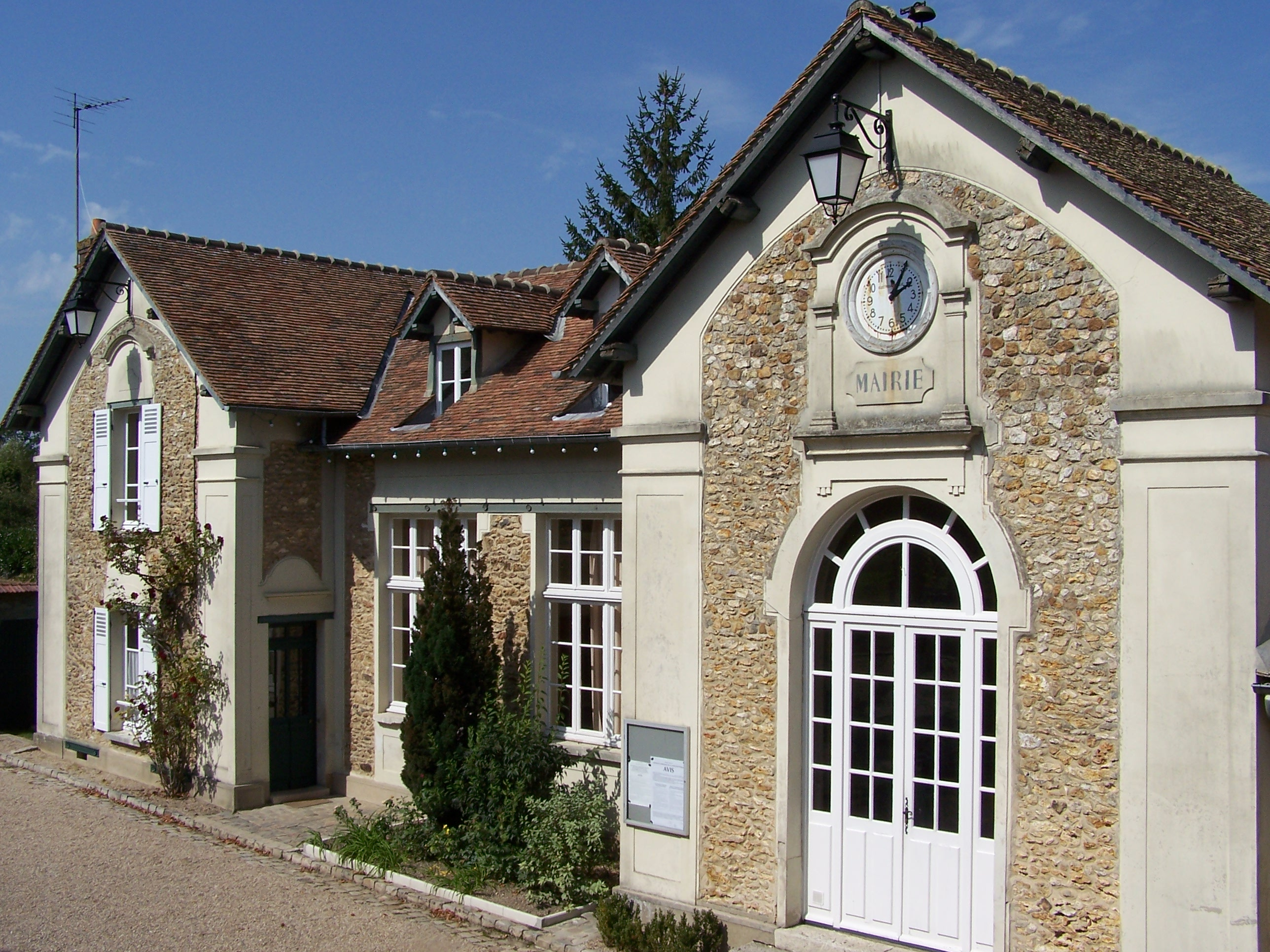
- Town hall
- Location of Millemont
- Location within France Location within Île-de-France (region)
- Coordinates: 48°48′36″N 1°44′43″E
- Country: France
- Region: Île-de-France
- Department: Yvelines
- Arrondissement: Rambouillet
- Canton: Aubergenville

Government
  - Mayor (2020–2026): Annie Joseph
- Area^{1}: 5.78 km^{2} (2.23 sq mi)
- Elevation: 128 m (420 ft)
- Highest elevation: 188 m (617 ft)
- Lowest elevation: 111 m (364 ft)
- Population (2023): 272
  - Density: 47.1/km^{2} (122/sq mi)
- Time zone: UTC+01:00 (CET)
  - Summer (DST): UTC+02:00 (CEST)
- INSEE/Postal code: 78404 /78940
- ^{1} French Land Register data, which excludes lakes, ponds, glaciers > 1 km^{2} (0.386 sq mi or 247 acres) and river estuaries.

Millemont is a commune in the Yvelines department in the Île-de-France region in north-central France.

== See also ==
- Communes of the Yvelines department
