= Sumner Spaulding =

American architect

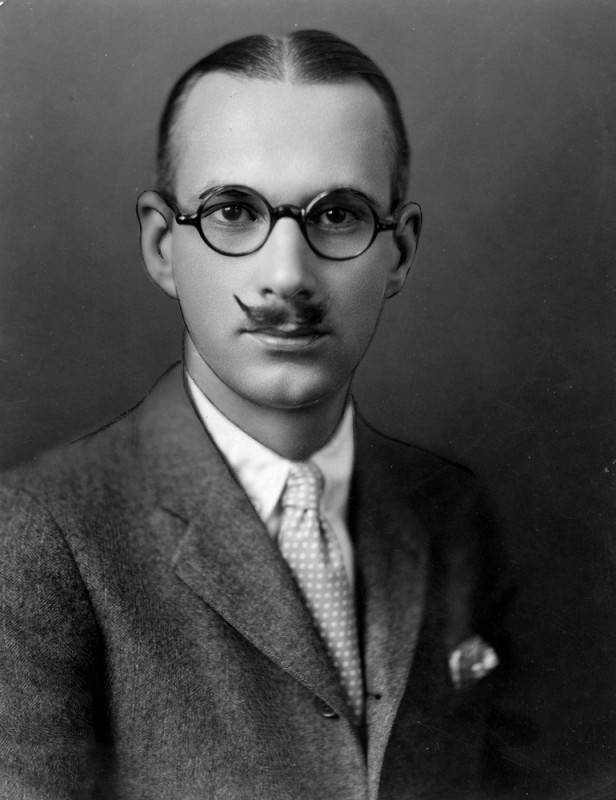
- Spaulding in 1926
- Born: June 14, 1892; Ionia, Michigan, U.S.
- Died: May 10, 1952 (aged 59); Los Angeles County, California, U.S.
- Education: Massachusetts Institute of Technology
- Occupation: Architect

Sumner Spaulding (1892–1952) was an American architect and city planner. He is best known for designing the Harold Lloyd Estate, a.k.a. Greenacres, in Beverly Hills, California, the Catalina Casino in Avalon on Santa Catalina Island, California, and the Malaga Cove Plaza in Palos Verdes Estates, California.

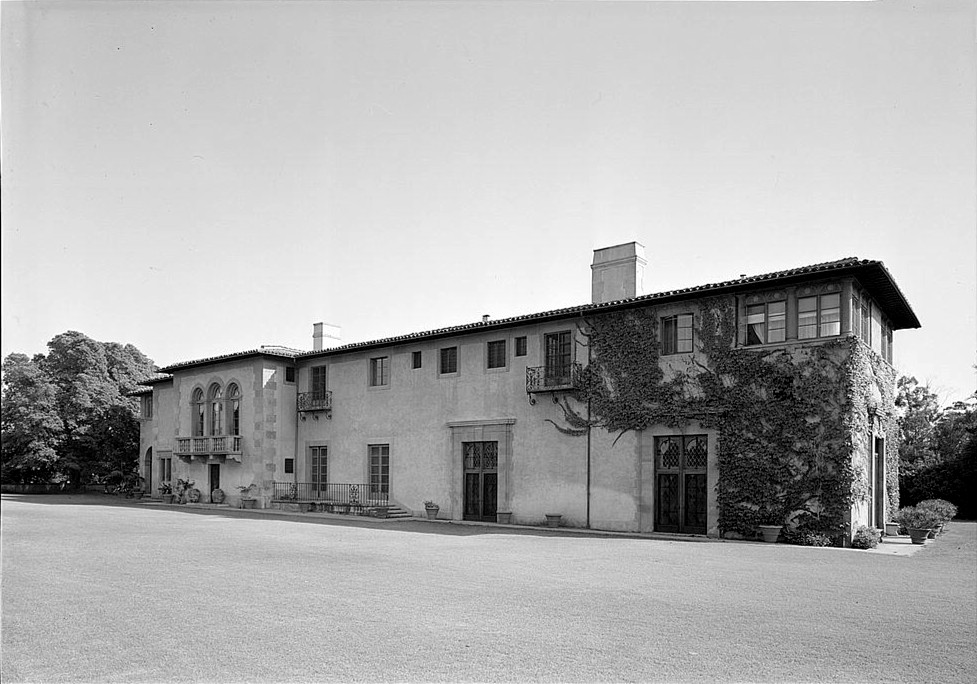
Harold Lloyd Estate, a.k.a. Greenacres, in Beverly Hills, California.

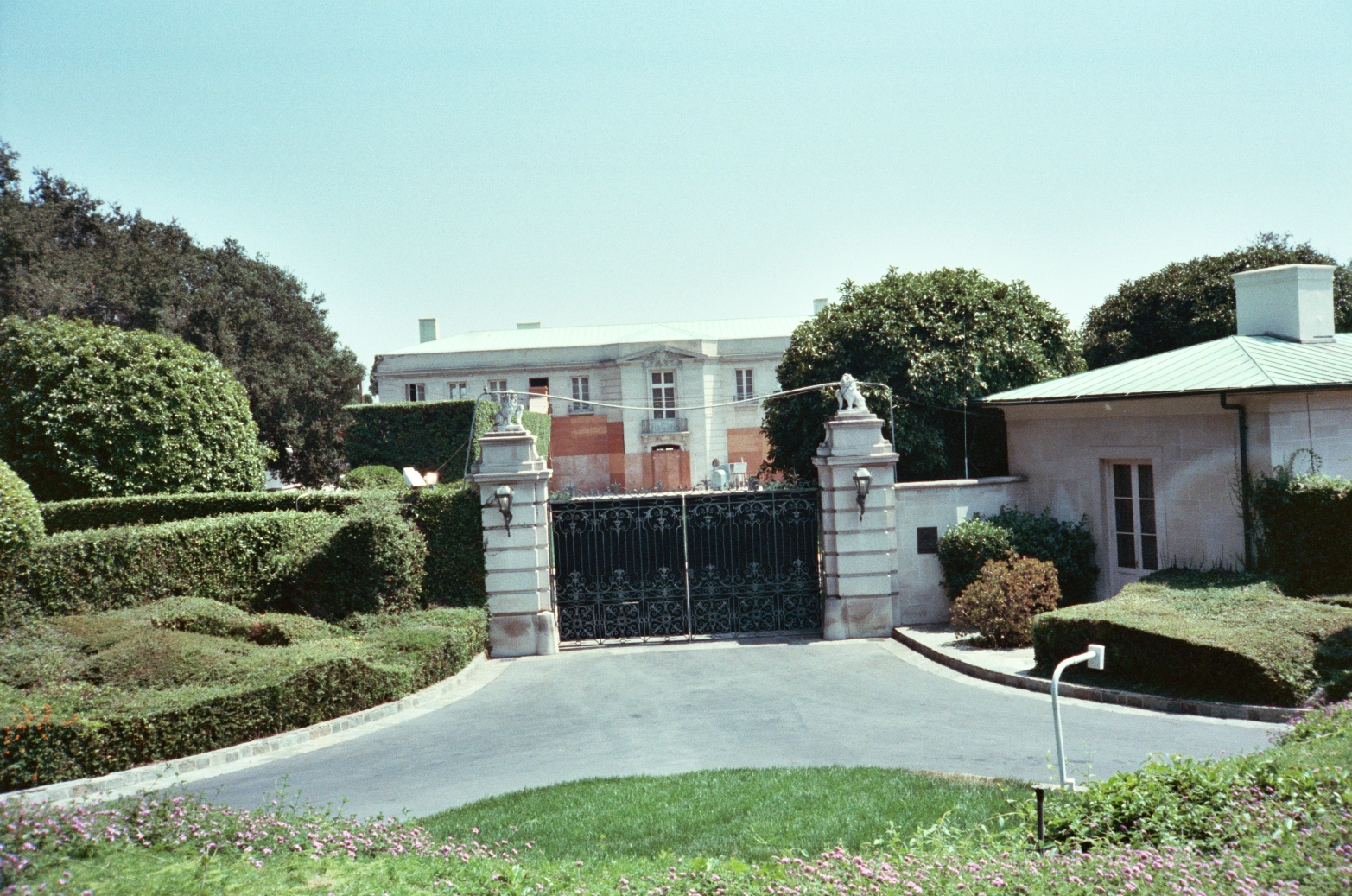
Chartwell Mansion in 1988

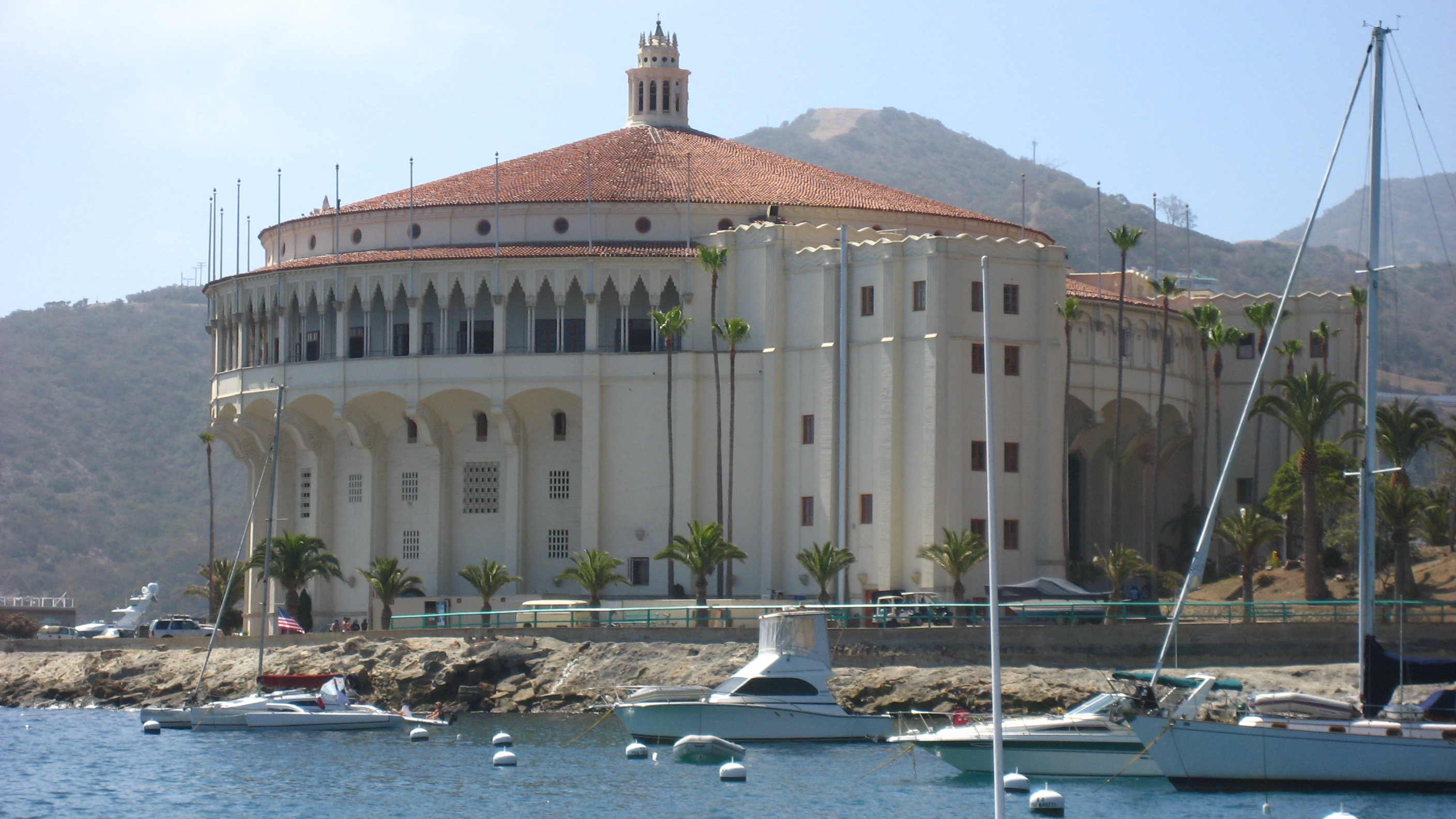
Catalina Casino in Avalon, Santa Catalina Island, California.

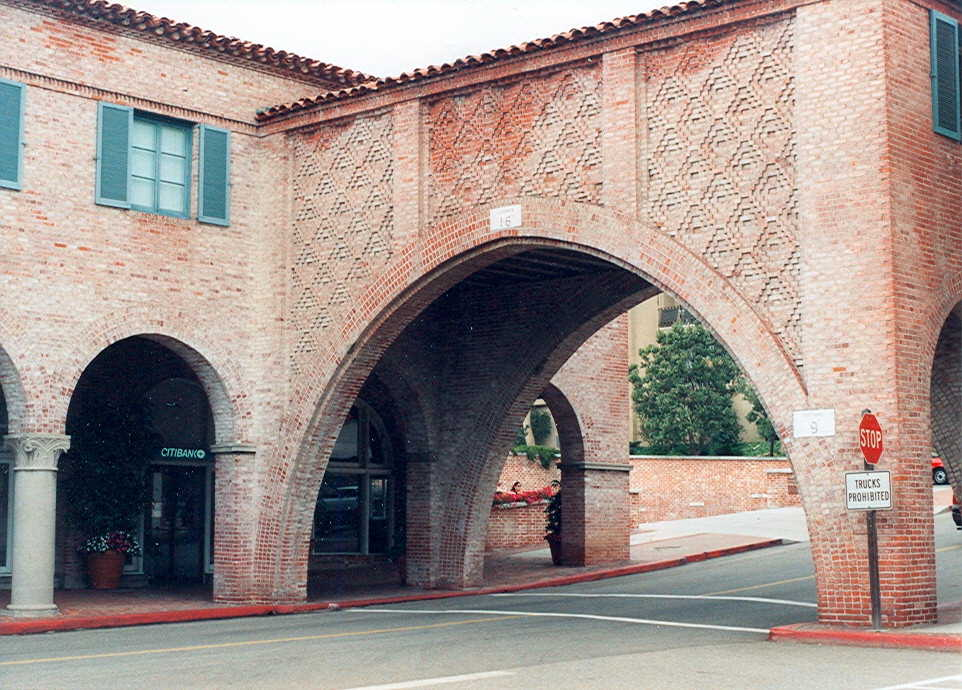
Malaga Cove Plaza in Palos Verdes Estates, California.

== Early life ==
Sumner Spaulding was born on June 14, 1892, in Ionia, Michigan. He attended the University of Michigan in Ann Arbor, Michigan, from 1911 to 1913, and graduated from the Massachusetts Institute of Technology in Boston, Massachusetts, in 1916. He also studied in Mexico and Europe.

== Career ==
Spaulding became an architect renowned in California. From 1928 to 1929, he designed the Lucien E. Frary Dining Hall on the campus of Pomona College in Claremont, California. He designed a building at 520 Midvale Avenue in Westwood, Los Angeles.

Additionally, Spaulding teamed up with other architects for many buildings and houses. With Walter I. Webber, he designed the Catalina Casino in Avalon on Catalina Island, built 1928−1929. They also designed the Harold Lloyd Estate 'Greenacres', located at 1040 Angelo Drive in Beverly Hills, California, now a California Historical Landmark. He designed Lloyd's beach house in Santa Monica, California.

In partnership with William Field Staunton, Jr. and Walter I. Webber, they designed the Malaga Cove Plaza, a shopping center in the community of Palos Verdes Estates from 1922 to 1924. They designed the fraternity house of Phi Kappa Sigma located at 10938 Strathmore Drive off the campus of UCLA in Westwood, Los Angeles in 1929. From 1928 to 1930, they designed the Eli P. Clark Dormitory on the campus of Pomona College.

In 1933, Spaulding designed 'Chartwell', built in the style of a French chateau for engineer Lynn Atkinson, who commissioned the property but never lived there. The house, set in gardens designed by Henri Samuel, was later owned by Arnold Kirkeby and Jerry Perenchio. It was used as the filming location for The Beverley Hillbillies and Jerry Lewis's Cinderfella.

In partnership with Clarence Gordon DeSwarte and John Leon Rex, they designed the Leibig Guest House and Farmer's Cottage in Encino, California, which won an Honor Award from the Southern California Chapter of the American Institute of Architects in January 1947. They designed the Behrendt House in North Hollywood, Los Angeles, which won an Honor Award from the Southern California Chapter of the American Institute of Architects in January 1947. In 1946, they designed a shop for the Barrett Textile Corporation in Los Angeles. Additionally, they designed the Red Cross chapter house in Los Angeles.

In 1945 Spaulding designed, and together with John Rex redesigned, the Midcentury modern style Case Study House No. 2, that was completed in 1947 in the Chapman Woods neighborhood of Pasadena. They also designed the Westchester High School located at 6550 West 80th Street in Westchester, Los Angeles in 1952.

Spaulding taught architecture at the University of Southern California in Los Angeles and at Scripps College in Claremont.

== Death ==
Sumner Spaulding died at age 59 on 10 May 1952 in Los Angeles County, and is buried at Fort Rosecrans National Cemetery in San Diego.
