= Jerry Perenchio =

American businessman and philanthropist (1930–2017)

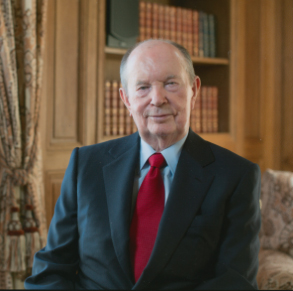
- Perenchio in January 2016
- Born: Andrew Jerrold Perenchio; December 20, 1930; Fresno, California, U.S.
- Died: May 23, 2017 (aged 86); Bel Air, Los Angeles, California, U.S.
- Education: B.S. Business Administration
- Alma mater: University of California, Los Angeles
- Years active: Former Chairman and CEO of Univision (1992—2007)
- Known for: Rules of the Road
- Board member of: Ronald Reagan Presidential Foundation (2000—2017)
- Children: 3
- Awards: Honorary Doctorate of Fine Arts, Cal State University, Fresno

Andrew Jerrold Perenchio (December 20, 1930 – May 23, 2017) was an American billionaire businessman and philanthropist. He was at one time the chairman and chief executive officer of Univision.

== Early life ==
Perenchio was the grandson of Italian immigrants Giovanni Batiste (later John) Perenchio and Madeline D'Adda, who came to the United States in 1896 from the northern Italian village of Pavone. His grandfather established the Fresno Grape Exchange, built a packinghouse that shipped fresh fruits and vegetables to the Great Lakes region, and later founded the Crestview Winery. Perenchio was raised in Fresno until the age of fifteen, when he was sent to Black Foxe Military Institute in Los Angeles for three-and-a-half years, graduating in 1949.

That fall, he enrolled at the University of California, Los Angeles (UCLA), attending for five years and completing his B.S. in business in 1954. He financed his own way through college, first with a series of odd jobs and then by establishing a small company – Party Management – that booked bands and catered parties at UCLA and the University of Southern California.

During his last two years at UCLA, Perenchio was a member of the Air Force ROTC, which required that he serve a three-year hitch in the Air Force after graduating. In 1955, he entered the Air Force as a 2nd Lieutenant and earned his wings as a single-engine jet fighter pilot. He was promoted to 1st Lieutenant and received an honorable discharge in 1958.

== Career ==
=== Music Corporation of America (MCA) ===
In 1958, Perenchio joined MCA Inc. in the Band and Act Department. He moved up the ranks to become the youngest vice president in the agency's history, and was made Head of the Concert Department for the eleven Western states and the Far East. Perenchio has said that he got his "MBA at MCA" and learned basic tenets that later informed his Rules of the Road: "take options, never grant them"; "never sell assets – lease them on a very short string"; "stay in the business you understand"; "make the calls and know the territory."

He worked at MCA for four years until July 13, 1962, when the United States Department of Justice Antitrust Division shut down MCA's talent-representing operations.

=== Perenchio Artists/Chartwell Artists ===
After the break-up of MCA, Perenchio started Perenchio Artists with partner Fred Dale in 1963. Its roster of clients included Andy Williams, Johnny Mathis, Henry Mancini, José Feliciano, Glen Campbell, Sergio Mendes, the Kingston Trio, and the Righteous Brothers, among others, many of whom followed Perenchio from MCA. He eventually merged with the Hugh French Agency to form Chartwell Artists, which represented actors, directors, writers, musicians, and singers. Perenchio's focus remained on live entertainment.

In 1969, while in London with Henry Mancini, Perenchio was introduced to Elton John, who had just recorded his first album. By the following summer, in August, 1970, Perenchio brought John from London to Los Angeles and rented out the Troubadour club in Hollywood for two weeks to showcase John's talent. Word got out after the first performance and John became an overnight sensation, launching his career in the United States.

Chartwell Artists grew to be the fifth-largest talent agency in the world, with such notable clients as Campbell, John, Feliciano, Mancino, Mathis, Mendes, Richard Burton, Elizabeth Taylor, Jane Fonda, Marlon Brando, Donovan, Rod Taylor, and Michael Landon.

Perenchio sold Chartwell in 1971 to Marvin Josephson's International Famous Agency when Perenchio decided to leave the agency business.

=== Sports promotion ===
In March 1971, Perenchio promoted the Fight of the Century at Madison Square Garden that brought together two unbeaten world heavyweight boxing champions, Muhammad Ali and Joe Frazier. Each fighter was guaranteed $2.5 million for the fight. The event blended sports with spectacle and glamorized boxing, in part because the sold-out crowd at the Garden included celebrities and politicians. Perenchio enlisted concert promoters to help sell 1.5 million closed-circuit tickets throughout the United States, and sold the rights in over 100 countries. Two years later, in September 1973, he promoted the Battle of the Sexes tennis match between Billie Jean King and Bobby Riggs that took place at the Houston Astrodome. It was the largest live audience (30,472) for any tennis match ever, and was the highest rated broadcast for that year when it was televised during prime-time on ABC.

=== Tandem Productions/Embassy Communications ===
Looking to branch out into television and motion pictures, Perenchio joined Norman Lear and Bud Yorkin in 1973 as a partner at Tandem Productions, and was made president and CEO. As part of the deal, Perenchio brought with him Alan F. Horn, a young Harvard Business School graduate whom he had recently hired away from Procter & Gamble in Cincinnati. In recruiting Horn, Perenchio wanted to bring someone new into the business, someone with an outside perspective that he could train. Within a few years, Perenchio made Horn president of Tandem, and the two worked together from 1973 to 1985 until the company and its parent company, Embassy Communications were sold to Columbia Pictures. Horn went on to become a prominent figure in the film industry; he co-founded Castle Rock Entertainment, was president and COO of Warner Brothers and then served as chairman of Walt Disney Studios.

Perenchio's business acumen combined with the creative talents of Lear and Yorkin transformed Tandem into the top television production and distribution company of its time, with hit shows that included All in the Family, Sanford and Son, Maude, Good Times and Diff'rent Strokes. Perenchio and Lear went on to form T.A.T. Communications Company – which launched The Jeffersons and One Day at a Time, along with a number of other successful half-hour situation comedies – and later purchased Embassy Pictures in 1982 (with Horn as CEO). He teamed up with Yorkin, separately, to produce the 1982 dystopian science fiction thriller Blade Runner, directed by Ridley Scott and starring Harrison Ford. Perenchio and Lear sold Embassy to The Coca-Cola Company in 1985, for $485 million in Coca-Cola stock.

After the sale of Embassy Communications, Perenchio went on to produce Driving Miss Daisy with the Zanuck Company in 1989. The film featured Jessica Tandy and Morgan Freeman, and won four Academy Awards including Best Adapted Screenplay, Best Actress and Best Picture. In 2002, Perenchio produced Frida with his wife Margaret Perenchio, which starred Salma Hayek.

=== Other business ventures ===
Throughout his career, Perenchio brokered some of the most lucrative deals in the entertainment industry: the sale of Caesars Palace to Lums Restaurants in 1969; the sale of A&M Records to PolyGram in 1989; and the sale of the Motown Records – again to PolyGram – in 1993.

He is considered a pioneer of pay television and co-founded National Subscription Television (ON-TV) in 1977, which featured mainstream movies, sports events and concert specials and became the largest "over-the-air" pay television network in the world. From 1985 to 1987 Perenchio owned the Loews Theaters, with locations in New York, New Jersey, Texas, California and five other states. With the relaxation of federal regulations concerning the Paramount Decrees, he sold the chain to Tri-Star Pictures at nearly four times the purchase price. It was the first deal of its kind between a theater chain and a film studio since the antitrust ruling by the Supreme Court in 1948.

=== Univision ===
Perenchio's most ambitious enterprise was partnering with Mexican media titan Emilio Azcárraga Milmo to purchase the Univision television network in 1992 for $550 million. The network was renamed Univision Communications, Inc. and built into a Fortune 500 company. Perenchio served as chairman and chief executive officer, and was the Controlling Shareholder.

Over a period of fifteen years, Univision expanded existing facilities, purchased 35 additional television stations, added Spanish radio stations, acquired Mexican record companies, and grew into one of the most successful multimedia companies in the world.

It became the most popular Spanish-language broadcast network in the United States and the first foreign language television network to occasionally outperform English language networks in the United States ratings. In 1996 the company went public and traded on the New York Stock Exchange under the symbol UVN. Perenchio sold Univision Communications in March 2007 for $13.5 billion to the Saban Capital Group, led by investor Haim Saban.

== Personal life ==
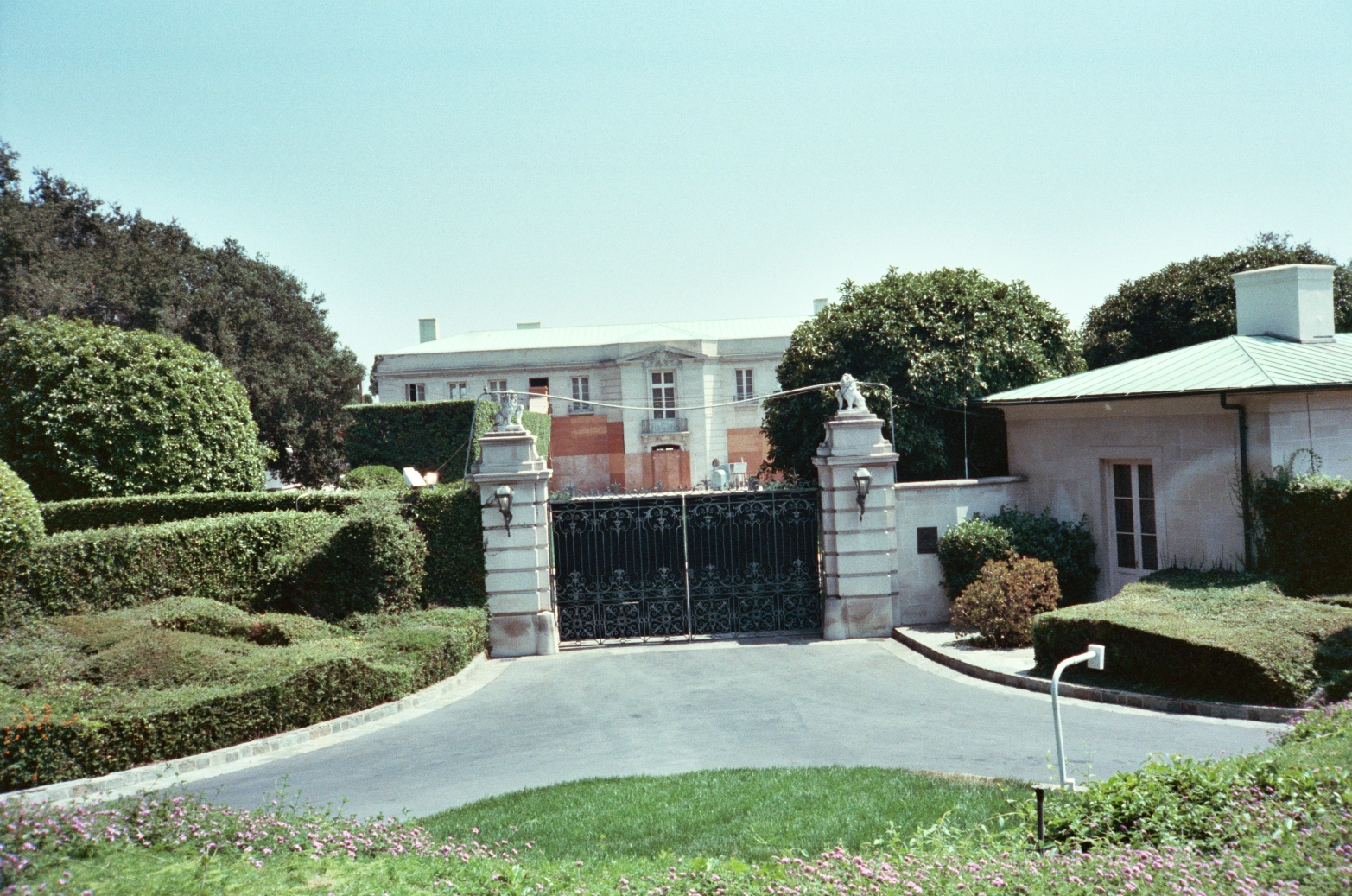
Chartwell Mansion in 1988

Perenchio was married three times and was separated from his third wife, Margaret Perenchio. He had one son and two adopted daughters from his first marriage, along with six grandchildren and three great-grandchildren.

In 1986, Perenchio purchased the 42-room former Arnold Kirkeby estate in Bel Air known as Chartwell, famed as the Clampett family mansion in the 1960s The Beverly Hillbillies TV series. He remodeled the home to more closely resemble the original design of an authentic 18th-century French chateau. He afterward bought many of the surrounding properties, expanding the compound to nearly 13 acres of land.

In June 2016, three months after Nancy Reagan's death in March 2016, Perenchio, who was a friend of the Reagans and whose Chartwell Mansion neighbored the 668 St. Cloud Road house which the Reagans owned in Bel Air since 1986, would acquire Nancy and Ronald Reagan's Bel Air home for $15 million. Under Perenchio's ownership, the former Reagan-owned house was immediately demolished, with new property being built at the location which would serve as part of Chartwell Mansion; however, property at the location of the former Reagan 668 St. Cloud Road home would eventually be demolished by 2020.

Perenchio died on May 23, 2017, of lung cancer in his home at the age of 86.

== Philanthropy ==
In late 2014, Perenchio announced that he would leave much of his art collection — at least 47 works valued at more than $500 million — to the Los Angeles County Museum of Art. His holdings include paintings by Claude Monet, Édouard Manet, and Pablo Picasso. At the same press conference, former Los Angeles County Supervisor Zev Yaroslavsky said of Perenchio, "There is no citizen of this community who has been more generous, and has asked for less..."

== Politics ==
A lifelong Republican, Perenchio was a supporter of initiatives and advocacy organizations that benefited the GOP. He was co-finance director for Senator John McCain's 2008 presidential campaign as well as an early and influential supporter of Carly Fiorina's 2016 presidential primary campaign.

== Awards and honors ==
From 2000, Perenchio served on the board of trustees for The Ronald Reagan Presidential Foundation. In 2011, he received an honorary Doctorate of Fine Arts Degree from Cal State University, Fresno at the school's Centennial Commencement.
