= Hidden Hills, California =

City in California, United States

- General law city
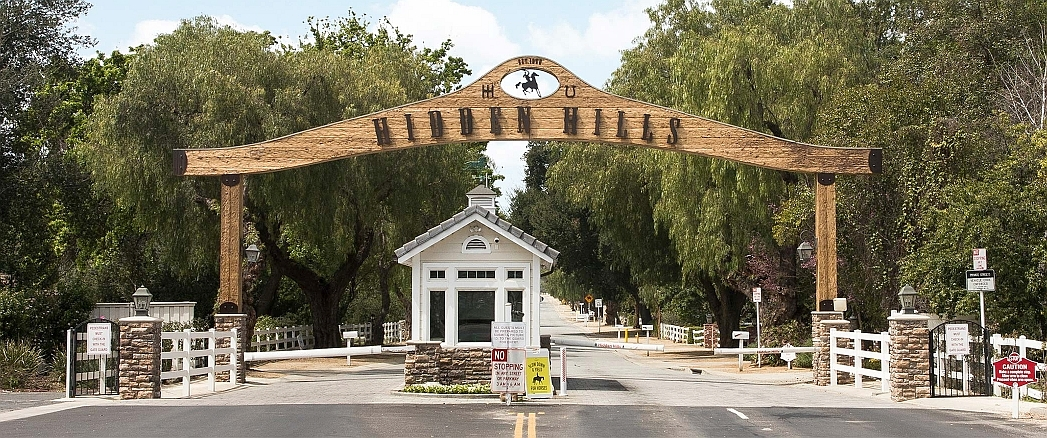
- Gate to Hidden Hills

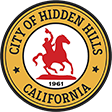
- Seal
- Interactive map of Hidden Hills, California
- Location in the United States
- Coordinates: 34°10′3″N 118°39′39″W
- Country: United States
- State: California
- County: Los Angeles
- Incorporated: October 19, 1961

Government
  - Mayor: Joe Loggia
  - Mayor Pro Tem: Stuart E. Siegel
  - City Council: Laura McCorkindale; Eniko Gold; Larry G. Weber
  - City Manager: Gloria Molleda

Area
  - Total: 1.69 sq mi (4.38 km^{2})
  - Land: 1.69 sq mi (4.38 km^{2})
  - Water: 0 sq mi (0.00 km^{2})

Population (2020)
  - Total: 1,725
  - Density: 1,020/sq mi (394/km^{2})
- Time zone: Pacific
  - Summer (DST): PDT
- ZIP code: 91302
- Area codes: 818
- FIPS code: 06-33518
- Website: hiddenhills.gov

Hidden Hills is a city and gated community in Los Angeles County, California, United States. It is located in the Santa Monica Mountains adjacent to Calabasas and the San Fernando Valley region of Los Angeles. The population was 1,725 as of 2020.

== History ==
The earliest inhabitants of the area were Chumash people.

The community was designed and developed in the 1950s by A. E. Hanson, a Southern California landscape architect and planned community developer. His earlier projects included Rolling Hills and Palos Verdes Estates, and the 1920s Beverly Hills Harold Lloyd Estate "Greenacres".

Hidden Hills became the 73rd city in Los Angeles County on October 19, 1961.

Vanity Fair described the city in 2017:

[W]ith its absence of sidewalks and streetlights, copious "Horses & children at play" signage, and abundant 2-acre lots surrounded by white three-rail fences, Hidden Hills exudes a certain rough-around-the-edges charm.

Originally conceived of as a "rustic retreat" from LA, it is now described as the "glitzy epicenter of Nouveau Hollywood" and an "uber-elite enclave".

== Geography ==
It is a gated residential community with a total area of 1.688 square miles (4.37 km^{2}), all land.

Hidden Hills is in the southern Simi Hills Transverse range near the Santa Monica Mountains on the western edge of the San Fernando Valley, near the border with neighboring Ventura County.

Hidden Hills is bordered on the north by the nature reserve and greenbelt of the Upper Las Virgenes Canyon Open Space Preserve, a park with miles of equestrian, hiking, and mountain biking trails. Nearby to the south, is the pioneer Leonis Adobe National Historic Landmark, with gardens and a historical museum. The city lies just north of U.S. Route 101, also called the Ventura Freeway.

=== Climate ===
Climate data for Hidden Hills, California
Month	Jan	Feb	Mar	Apr	May	Jun	Jul	Aug	Sep	Oct	Nov	Dec	Year
Mean daily maximum °F (°C)	66 (19)	68 (20)	70 (21)	75 (24)	79 (26)	85 (29)	92 (33)	93 (34)	89 (32)	82 (28)	73 (23)	67 (19)	78 (26)
Mean daily minimum °F (°C)	42 (6)	43 (6)	44 (7)	46 (8)	50 (10)	54 (12)	57 (14)	58 (14)	56 (13)	51 (11)	44 (7)	41 (5)	49 (9)
Average precipitation inches (mm)	5.59 (142)	5.56 (141)	4.69 (119)	1.12 (28)	0.31 (7.9)	0.07 (1.8)	0.02 (0.51)	0.16 (4.1)	0.29 (7.4)	0.63 (16)	1.89 (48)	3.12 (79)	23.45 (596)

== Demographics ==
Historical population
Census	Pop.	Note	%±
1970	1,529		—
1980	1,760		15.1%
1990	1,729		−1.8%
2000	1,875		8.4%
2010	1,856		−1.0%
2020	1,725		−7.1%
U.S. Decennial Census; 1860–1870 1880-1890; 1900 1910 1920; 1930 1940 1950; 1960 1970 1980; 1990 2000 2010; 2020

Hidden Hills first appeared as a city in the 1970 U.S. census. Prior to 1970, the area was part of the unincorporated portion of the Calabasas census county division.

=== Racial and ethnic composition ===
Hidden Hills city, California – Racial and ethnic composition Note: the US Census treats Hispanic/Latino as an ethnic category. This table excludes Latinos from the racial categories and assigns them to a separate category. Hispanics/Latinos may be of any race.
Race / Ethnicity (NH = Non-Hispanic)	Pop 1990	Pop 2000	Pop 2010	Pop 2020	% 1990	% 2000	% 2010	% 2020
White alone (NH)	1,543	1,669	1,622	1,393	89.24%	89.01%	87.39%	80.75%
Black or African American alone (NH)	7	12	36	32	0.40%	0.64%	1.94%	1.86%
Native American or Alaska Native alone (NH)	4	6	3	3	0.23%	0.32%	0.16%	0.17%
Asian alone (NH)	48	39	39	75	2.78%	2.08%	2.10%	4.35%
Native Hawaiian or Pacific Islander alone (NH)	48	0	1	0	2.78%	0.00%	0.05%	0.00%
Other race alone (NH)	-	4	4	20	-	0.21%	0.22%	1.16%
Mixed race or Multiracial (NH)	x	20	28	85	x	1.07%	1.51%	4.93%
Hispanic or Latino (any race)	127	125	123	117	7.35%	6.67%	6.63%	6.78%
Total	1,729	1,875	1,856	1,725	100.00%	100.00%	100.00%	100.00%

=== 2020 census ===
As of the 2020 census, Hidden Hills had a population of 1,725. The median age was 48.3 years; 21.7% of residents were under the age of 18 and 21.6% were 65 years of age or older. For every 100 females there were 90.8 males, and for every 100 females age 18 and over there were 92.6 males age 18 and over.

100.0% of residents lived in urban areas, while 0.0% lived in rural areas.

There were 593 households in Hidden Hills, of which 36.4% had children under the age of 18 living in them. Of all households, 67.3% were married-couple households, 10.6% were households with a male householder and no spouse or partner present, and 19.4% were households with a female householder and no spouse or partner present. About 13.7% of all households were made up of individuals and 7.9% had someone living alone who was 65 years of age or older.

Including all responses for people of two or more races, 1,542 (89.4%) were white alone or in combination with one or more other races, 111 (6.4%) were Asian alone or in combination with one or more other races, 59 (3.4%) were Black or African American alone or in combination, 13 (0.8%) were American Indian and Alaska Native alone or in combination, 12 (0.7%) were Native Hawaiian and other Pacific Islander alone or in combination, and 133 (7.7%) were some other race alone or in combination with one or more other races.

There were 635 housing units, of which 593 (93.4%) were occupied and 42 (6.6%) were vacant. 536 (90.4%) of the occupied units were owner-occupied and 57 (9.6%) were renter-occupied. The homeowner vacancy rate was 2.0% and the rental vacancy rate was 3.4%. Of the vacant units, 2 (0.3% of total) were for rent, 11 (1.7%) were for sale only, 7 (1.1%) were sold but not occupied, 9 (1.4%) were for seasonal, recreational, or occasional use, and 13 (2.0%) were otherwise vacant.

=== Mapping L.A. ===
According to Mapping L.A., Russian and English were the most common ancestries in 2000. Mexico and Canada were the most common foreign places of birth.

== Government ==
In the California State Legislature, Hidden Hills is located within the 24th senatorial district, represented by Democrat Ben Allen, and in the 42nd Assembly district, represented by Democrat Jacqui Irwin.

In the United States House of Representatives, Hidden Hills is located within California's 32nd congressional district, represented by Democrat Brad Sherman.

Hidden Hills has traditionally been won by Republican candidates for public office. However, the 2016 United States presidential election represented a substantial swing toward the Democratic Party in Hidden Hills, with Hillary Clinton carrying the town.

In California's 2006 gubernatorial election, incumbent Republican Governor Arnold Schwarzenegger received more than 72% of votes cast, while his Democratic opponent, Phil Angelides, received approximately 25%.

In the 2012 United States presidential election, the Republican candidate, Governor Mitt Romney of Massachusetts received 54.5% of votes cast, compared to the incumbent Democratic President Barack Obama who received 44.4% of votes cast.

== Education ==
The one public school in Hidden Hills, Round Meadow Elementary, scored 902 in the 2013 Academic Performance Index.

== Infrastructure ==
The Los Angeles County Sheriff's Department (LASD) operates the Malibu/Lost Hills Station in Calabasas, serving Hidden Hills.

The Los Angeles County Fire Department (LACoFD) handles fire service calls for Hidden Hills.

== Notable people ==
- Pepe Aguilar, singer, actor, and producer
- Marc Anthony, singer
- Frankie Avalon, musician
- Iggy Azalea, rapper
- Ashlee Bond (born 1985), Olympic rider
- Edgar Buchanan, actor
- Tyson Chandler, professional basketball player
- Eddie Cibrian, actor
- Kaley Cuoco, actress
- Miley Cyrus, singer-songwriter
- DeMar DeRozan, basketball player
- Scott Disick, television personality
- Drake, rapper
- Don Drysdale (1936–1993), Los Angeles Dodgers pitcher
- Jeff Dunham, comedian and ventriloquist
- Kevin Durant, NBA player for the Phoenix Suns
- Elliot Easton, musician (The Cars)
- Melissa Etheridge, musician
- Scott Foley, actor
- Jamie Foxx, actor
- Daisy Fuentes, TV personality and host
- Paul George, professional basketball player
- Jared Goff, NFL quarterback
- Selena Gomez, actress, singer
- Taylor Hawkins (1972-2022), drummer for Foo Fighters
- Robert Herjavec, businessman
- Olivia Jade, YouTuber
- Caitlyn Jenner, Olympic athlete, television personality
- Kendall Jenner, model, television personality
- Kris Jenner, television personality
- Khloé Kardashian, television personality
- Kim Kardashian, television personality
- Rob Kardashian, television personality
- Chuck Liddell, martial artist
- Diana Jenkins, entrepreneur and philanthropist
- Lori Loughlin, actress
- Leona Lewis, singer-songwriter and activist
- Jennifer Lopez, singer, actress, and entrepreneur
- Madonna, singer/actress
- Howie Mandel, comedian, TV host
- Richard Marx, singer-songwriter, producer
- Marie McDonald, actress, singer
- Sean McVay, NFL coach
- Nicki Minaj, rapper
- French Montana, rapper
- Shay Mitchell, actress
- Sharon Osbourne, television personality,
- Russell Peters, comedian
- Trevor Plouffe, Major League Baseball (MLB) player
- Jeff Porcaro, musician, member of Toto
- Jalen Ramsey, football player
- Denise Richards, actress and model
- LeAnn Rimes, singer-songwriter, and producer
- Josh Satin, major league baseball player
- Vin Scully (1927–2022), sportscaster
- Nicolette Sheridan, actress
- Shroud, online streamer
- Ben Simmons, basketball player
- Jessica Simpson, singer
- Sinbad, stand-up comedian, actor
- Nikki Sixx, musician
- Will Smith, rapper, actor
- Jada Pinkett-Smith, actress, singer
- Jaden Smith, rapper, singer, songwriter, actor
- Britney Spears, pop singer, in a home formerly owned by construction magnate Ronald Tutor
- Matthew Stafford, NFL player
- John Stamos, actor and musician
- Sylvester Stallone, actor
- Jeffree Star, makeup artist
- Gabrielle Union, actress
- Alex Van Halen, musician
- Dwyane Wade, basketball player
- The Weeknd, musician
- Kanye West, rapper and producer
- Lil Wayne, rapper

== In popular culture ==
The city was the setting of a short-lived NBC sitcom, Hidden Hills, which aired in 2002–2003.

== See also ==
- List of municipalities in California
