= Arnold Kirkeby =

American businessman (1901–1962)

- Born: Arnold Sigurd Kirkeby; June 12, 1901; Chicago, Illinois, U.S.
- Died: March 1, 1962 (aged 60); Jamaica Bay, New York, U.S.
- Resting place: Westwood Village Memorial Park Cemetery
- Occupation(s): Hotelier, real estate investor, art collector
- Spouse: Carlotta Cuesta (m. 1928)

Arnold Sigurd Kirkeby (June 12, 1901 – March 1, 1962) was an American hotelier, art collector, and real estate investor. He is now best known for owning Chartwell Mansion in the Los Angeles neighborhood of Bel Air which was the exterior set for the CBS television show The Beverly Hillbillies.

== Biography ==
Kirkeby was born in Chicago, Illinois, the son of Norwegian immigrants. He was married to Carlotta Cuesta (1906–1985), the daughter of Angel LaMadrid Cuesta, founder of the Cuesta-Rey Cigar Company based in Tampa, Florida.

Kirkeby was the founder of the Kirkeby Hotel chain, beginning in Chicago with the Drake Hotel, and ending his hotel interests when he sold the Beverly Wilshire in Beverly Hills, California. After selling the hotel chain and its Chicago ties, he then invested in the Janss Investment Company development of Westwood, Los Angeles, California, in 1959. As part of this project, Kirkeby broke ground on the Kirkeby Center on Wilshire Boulevard in 1960, but died before the building was completed. Kirkeby Center is now known as the Occidental Petroleum Building, and is the home of the Armand Hammer Museum.

Television fans will note that Kirkeby owned the stately mansion located at 750 Bel Air Road in Bel Air, California, used for exterior shots in the hit CBS sitcom The Beverly Hillbillies. Series producer Paul Henning paid the family (Mr. Kirkeby had been killed in a plane crash prior to the series debut) $500 per day for filming on the mansion's grounds. The mansion's interior and rear were duplicated on Stage 4 at General Service Studios. Contractual provisions at the time prevented disclosure of the mansion's address in press releases, and required restoration of the grounds after each shoot. The mansion had been previously used by Jerry Lewis in the 1960 film Cinderfella.

Kirkeby died aboard American Airlines Flight 1 when it crashed shortly after takeoff from New York City.

== Hotels ==
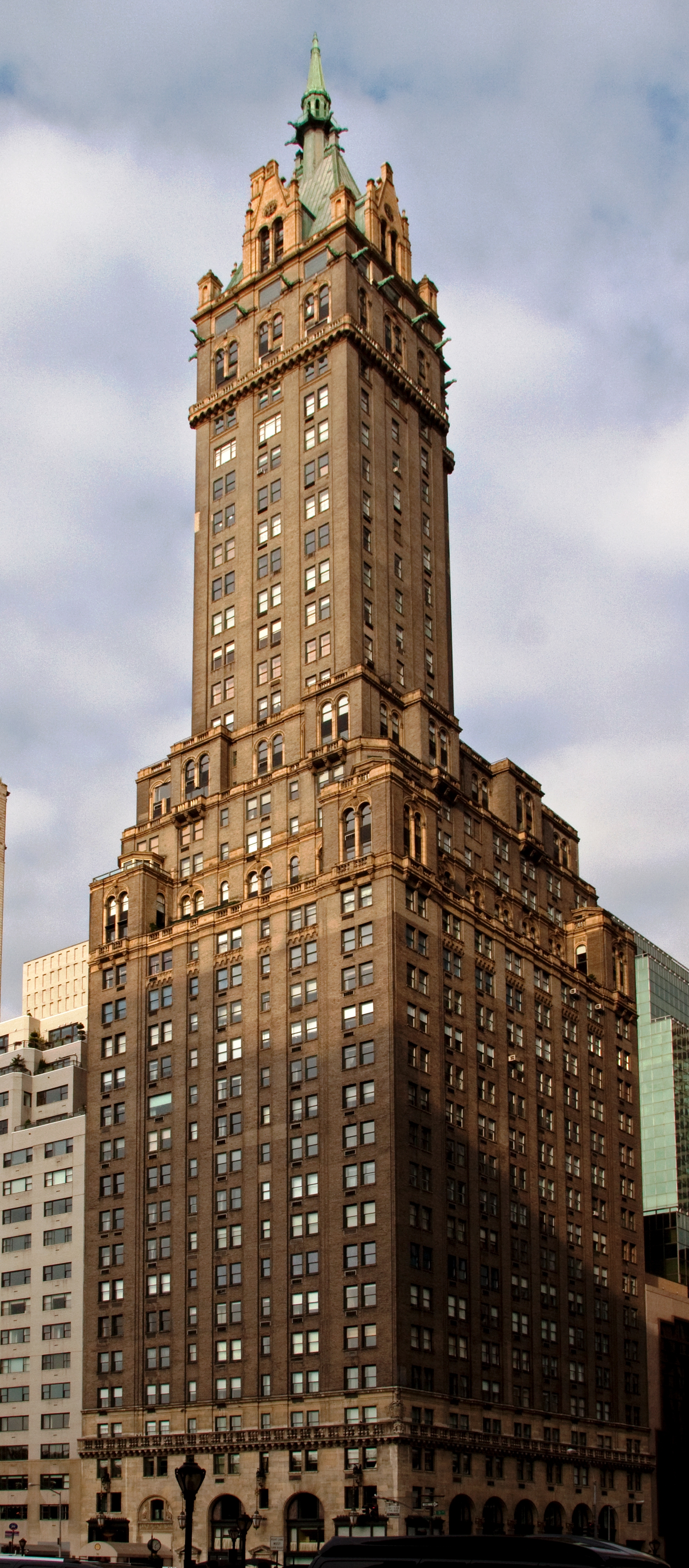
The Sherry-Netherland Hotel in New York

The Kirkeby Hotel organization included:

California

- Beverly Wilshire Hotel, Beverly Hills, California
- The Town House, Los Angeles, California
- Sunset Tower, West Hollywood, California

Florida

- The Kenilworth, Miami Beach, Florida
- Belleview-Biltmore Hotel, Clearwater, Florida

Illinois

- The Blackstone Hotel, Chicago, Illinois
- The Drake, Chicago, Illinois

New York

- The Gotham, New York, New York
- Hampshire House, New York, New York
- The Sherry-Netherland, New York, New York
- The Warwick, New York, New York
- Saranac Inn, Saranac Lake, New York

New Jersey

- Hotel Ambassador, Atlantic City, New Jersey: Rebuilt as the Tropicana Casino

Pennsylvania

- The Warwick, Philadelphia, Pennsylvania

Cuba

- Hotel Nacional de Cuba, Havana, Cuba

Panama

- El Panama Hotel, Panama City, Panama
