= A. E. Hanson =

American landscape architect and landscape designer

- Born: Archibald Elexis Hanson; December 20, 1893; Chino, California, U.S.
- Died: February 21, 1986 (aged 92)
- Occupation(s): Landscape architect, real estate developer

A. E. Hanson (1893–1986) was an American landscape architect and real estate developer in Southern California. He designed gardens on the campus of the University of Southern California as well as in Bel Air. He developed two gated communities near Los Angeles, California: Rolling Hills and Hidden Hills.

== Early life ==
Archibald Elexis Hanson was born on December 20, 1893, in Chino, California. His father was a Canadian who migrated to the United States in 1885 and worked as a real estate developer, selling orange groves to Midwesterners. He only attended high school for two years, before he started working.

== Career ==
Hanson started his career by working for landscape architects Theodore Payne and, by 1915, Paul Howard. In 1916, he started his own architectural firm.

In 1921, Hanson designed the gardens of the Getty House in Los Angeles, which serves as the official residence of the Mayor of Los Angeles. From 1925 to 1929, he designed the 4.75-acre gardens of the Harold Lloyd Estate in Beverly Hills, California. In 1927, he designed the Hawaii garden of the Hannah Carter Japanese Garden in Bel Air, Los Angeles for oilman Gordon G. Guiberson. In 1929, he designed the grounds of the H.C. Lippiatt-F.M.P. Taylor House in Bel Air, Los Angeles. That year he also designed the a formal English garden for the Gertrude K. and Gerald C. Young House built by Roland Coate in Hancock Park, Los Angeles. In 1928–1929, he designed the gardens of the Archibald Young House designed by architect George Washington Smith in Pasadena, California.

In 1930, Hanson designed the gardens of the Monterey Colonial style mansion of D.C. Norcross designed by architect Roland Coate, located at 673 Siena Way in Bel Air, Los Angeles. He also designed the gardens of the Doheny Library on the campus of the University of Southern California.

In the 1930s, Hanson developed two gated communities, Rolling Hills, California, as well as Hidden Hills, California. From 1932 to 1944, he served as President of the Palos Verdes Corporation. He also worked with architect Charles H. Cheney (1884-1943) to design a highway surrounding the Palos Verdes Peninsula.

== Death ==
Hanson died on February 21, 1986.
