= 668 St. Cloud Road =

Private home in Los Angeles California

Coordinates: 34°05′13″N 118°26′26″W

668 St. Cloud Road (previously 666 St. Cloud Road) was a residence in the Bel Air neighborhood of Los Angeles, California, United States. It was occupied by Ronald Reagan, the 40th president of the United States, and his wife Nancy Reagan from the end of his presidency in 1989 until their deaths in 2004 and 2016. The interior was designed by Peter Schifando, a protégé of Ted Graber. An auction at Christie's of items from the Reagans' private collections from the house took place in 2016.

== History ==
The house was purchased by a group of friends for Nancy and Ronald Reagan for US$2.5 million in 1986 (equivalent to $7,343,000 in 2025). The friends included the businessmen Earle Jorgensen and Holmes Tuttle, members of Ronald Reagan's informal "kitchen cabinet" of wealthy supporters and advisers. The house was purchased with an agreement that the Reagans could lease the house with an option to buy it in the future. It was given to a trust under the name of the couple in 1989. The couple repaid their friends with their earnings from the advances on their memoirs, An American Life and My Turn. They moved to the house in 1989 after leaving the White House in Washington, D.C., where Ronald had served as President of the United States until his term ended that same year. Ronald Reagan died at the house in 2004 aged 93 after suffering from Alzheimer's disease for many years. Nancy Reagan died at the house in 2016 aged 94.

The Reagans' neighbors in 1987 included Burt Bacharach, Michael D. Eisner, Henry Salvatori, Robert Stack and Elizabeth Taylor.

Nancy Reagan's superstitions regarding the number 666, also known as the number of the beast, caused her to ask the government of Los Angeles to change the number of the residence from 666 to 668 St. Cloud Road, which they did.

The couple received numerous notable political visitors at the house including the German chancellor Helmut Kohl, the Canadian prime minister Brian Mulroney, and the British prime minister Margaret Thatcher. Many Republican presidential candidates visited the Reagans at the house during their campaigns including, George W. Bush to Mitt Romney. Only the Reagans' children were permitted to visit them at the house during the years of Ronald Reagan's illness.

The house was bought by the businessman Jerry Perenchio for $15 million three months following Nancy Reagan's death on June 23, 2016. Perenchio owned several properties near the house at the time of his purchase including the Chartwell Mansion. Perenchio was also part of the board of trustees for the Ronald Reagan Presidential Foundation since 2000.

Under Perenchio's ownership, the house was immediately demolished, with new property being built as part Perenchio's Chartwell Mansion. Property at the location of the former 668 St. Cloud Road Reagan home would be demolished by 2020.

== Description ==
The house was built in 1954 in the mid-century modern style and stood in 1.29 acres (0.52 ha) of grounds. It was described as a 'California ranch style' house and was considered modest in size when compared with other houses in Bel-Air. Nancy Reagan described the house as "... deceiving, because from outside it looks so tiny". The driveway to the house was lined with bougainvillea. Nancy Reagan grew yellow orchids in the hothouse under the swimming pool. The house had extensive views of Century City and Downtown Los Angeles. In 2016 it was 7,200 square feet (670 m^{2}) in size with three bedrooms and six bathrooms over two stories. The house had a swimming pool and landscaped grounds and lawns. The house had an exercise room and wine cellar and two servants' rooms above the kitchen. A 1987 neighbor told the Washington Post reporter Lloyd Grove that the house was "... not adequate. It doesn't have good parking facilities. I don't know where they'll put their guests and all that. It's not an architecturally beautiful place. The price, however, was very good".

The interior of the house was designed by Peter Schifando. He had worked under Ted Graber, who had decorated the family residence of the White House for Nancy Reagan. Graber had been a disciple of the decorator William Haines. Graber retired in 1989 after spending the previous year preparing and decorating the house with Schifando prior to the Reagans' arrival in Los Angeles. Meredith Mendelsohn described the interior style of the house in Architectural Digest as "a mix of chinoiserie, exoticism, fine antiques, and modern lines". Schifando described the interior as "soft modern" with traditional furnishings combined with the mid-century modern style. Mendelsohn noted that the house was decorated with "Chinese export porcelain, George III–style furniture, Chinese lacquer furniture, midcentury pieces updated in the '80s, Haines Inc. sofas and chairs, State Department gifts, barware, several porcelain dinner services ... and some spectacular bird and fish lamps". Schifando was subsequently assisted by Jonathan Joseph. Joseph once accidentally stood on Ronald Reagan's foot while admiring a tree from the master bedroom. The house included many items of furniture in the Hollywood Regency style designed by Haines. The hallway of the house was decorated with Frederic Remington bronze equestrian sculptures of cowboys. A study in pen and ink by Norman Rockwell of Ronald Reagan striking different expressions hung in the hallway. The sunroom and formal room were decorated with pale-green Chinese wallpaper. An auction of items from the Reagans' private collections from the house took place at Christie's in New York in September 2016 of furniture, objet d'art, silverware and paintings. The sale benefitted the Ronald Reagan Presidential Foundation and Institute. Notable items included silver beakers by Gerald Benney given to the Reagans by Denis and Margaret Thatcher in 1985 and 1990, and a marine chronometer made by Tiffany & Co. given by Barbara and Frank Sinatra in 1981. Two landscape paintings by Grandma Moses and abstract paintings by Frank Sinatra were also included in the sale. Items in the sale with a green sticker placed on them had previously been part of the Reagans' Executive Residence during their time at the White House.

The house was not visible from the road, with only the gate of the house and the gatehouse occupied by the U.S. Secret Service visible during the couple's residency.

== See also ==
- List of residences of presidents of the United States
