= Ted Graber =

American designer

- Born: c. 1920; Los Angeles, California, U.S.
- Died: June 3, 2000 (aged 79–80); Sonoma, California, U.S.
- Education: Chouinard Art Institute
- Occupation: Interior designer
- Partner: Arch Case (companion)

Ted Graber (1920 – June 3, 2000) was an American interior designer. He designed many private residences in Los Angeles, California. During the Reagan administration, he designed the family quarters of the White House and the official residence of the United States Ambassador to the United Kingdom, Winfield House.

== Early life ==
Ted Graber was born circa 1920 in Los Angeles, California. His father was a cabinet-maker and an antiquarian. His grandfather was also an antiquarian. He had a brother, Raymond.

Graber studied at the Chouinard Art Institute. He served in the United States Army during World War II.

== Career ==
Graber began his career as an assistant to interior designer William Haines. Graber and Haines remodelled windows in Spanish Revival houses, adding larger windows to bring in more sunlight.

As an independent interior designer, Graber's style was traditional with a touch of glamour. He often mixed antique furniture, particularly from the Regency era, with more modern pieces of furniture. He also added Asian figurines.

Graber was hired by First Lady Nancy Reagan to redecorate the family quarters of the White House in 1981. He also decorated the Reagans's private residence at 668 St. Cloud Road in Bel Air, Los Angeles. Additionally, he designed President Reagan's office in Century City. Graber was succeeded by Peter Schifando as the Reagan's designer at Bel-Air.

Meanwhile, Graber was hired by Walter Annenberg and his wife, Leonore Annenberg, to design their Sunnylands residence in Palm Springs, California, as well as Winfield House, the official residence of the US Ambassador in London. Additionally, he designed the private residence of Alfred S. Bloomingdale and his wife, Betsy Bloomingdale. In New York City, he was hired to design the apartments of Jack Warner and Joan Crawford.

Graber retired in 1989.

== Personal life and death ==
Graber was gay and lived with his partner Archie Case for forty years. The couple stayed the night at the White House after Nancy Reagan's sixtieth birthday.

Graber contracted Alzheimer's disease. He lived in a retirement home in Sonoma, California, where he died on June 3, 2000. He was 80 years old.
