= Cinderfella =

1960 film by Frank Tashlin

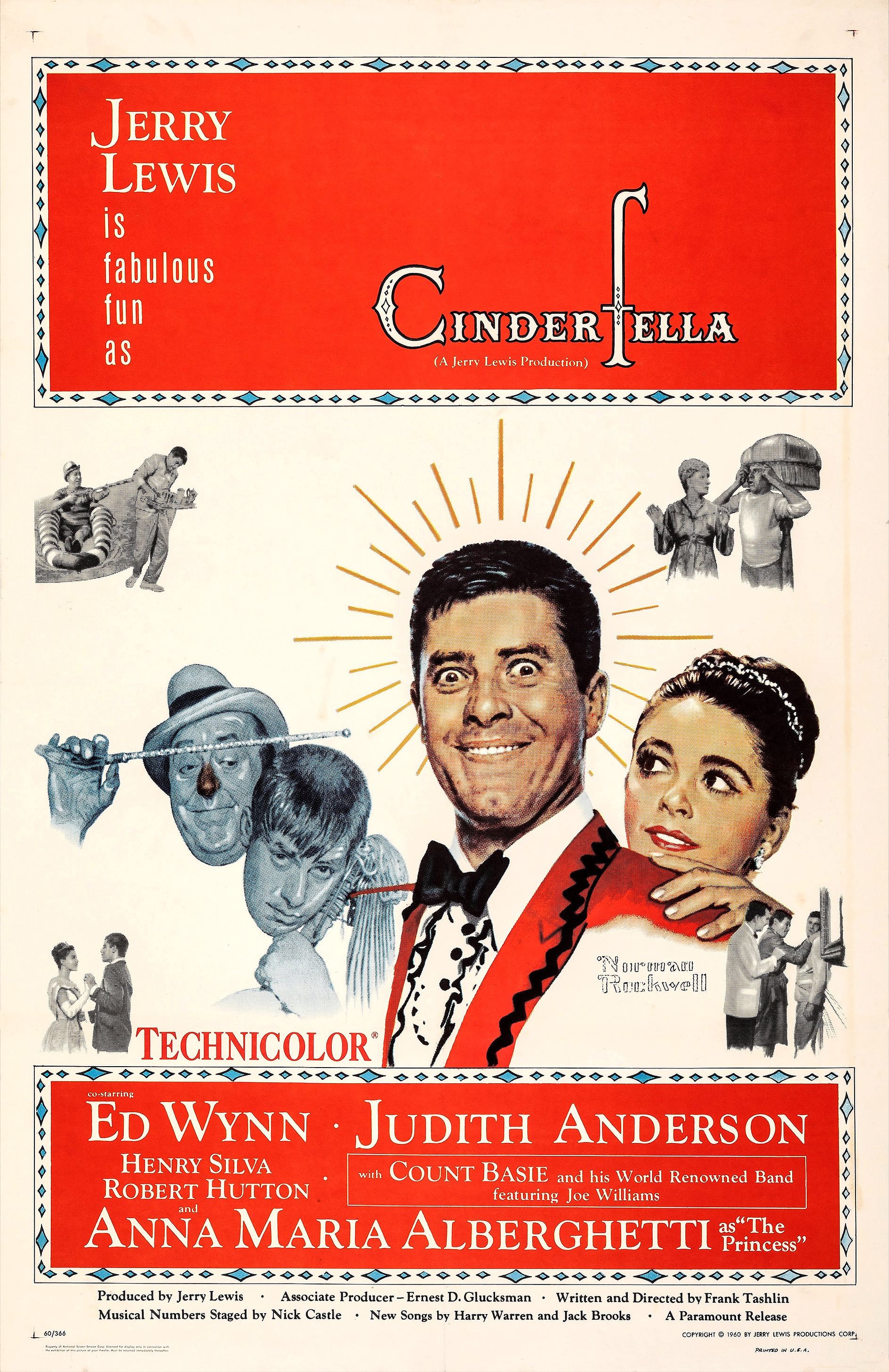
- Theatrical release poster by Norman Rockwell
- Directed by: Frank Tashlin
- Written by: Frank Tashlin
- Produced by: Jerry Lewis
- Starring: Jerry Lewis; Ed Wynn; Judith Anderson; Anna Maria Alberghetti
- Cinematography: Haskell B. Boggs
- Edited by: Arthur P. Schmidt
- Music by: Walter Scharf
- Distributed by: Paramount Pictures
- Release date: November 22, 1960
- Running time: 91 minutes
- Country: United States
- Language: English
- Box office: $2.9 million (US); 936,799 admissions (France)

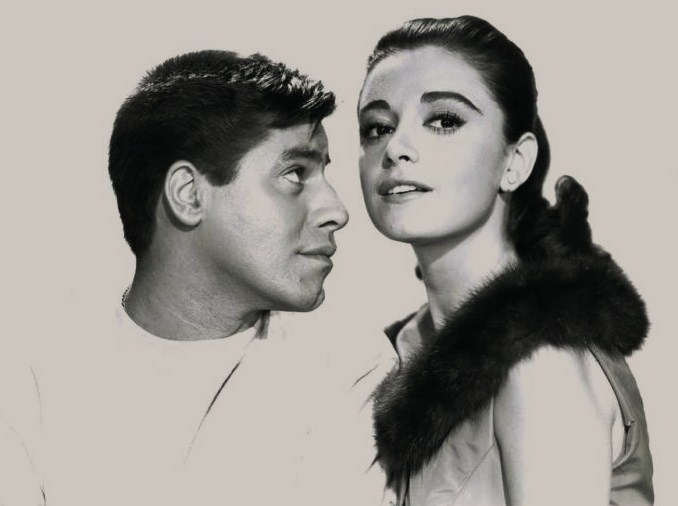
Jerry Lewis and Anna Maria Alberghetti.

Cinderfella is a 1960 American semi-musical comedy film adaptation of the classic Cinderella story, with most characters changed in gender from female to male and starring Jerry Lewis as Fella. It was released on November 22, 1960, by Paramount Pictures.

== Plot ==
When Fella's father dies, he continues to live with his wicked stepmother Emily and her two sons, Maximilian and Rupert. His stepfamily takes over the family mansion, while Fella is reduced to living in an unfinished room at the end of a long hallway. He has essentially become their butler, catering to their every whim.

Fella dreams nightly that his father is trying to relay a message to him about where he has hidden his fortune, but he always awakens before he learns the hiding place. His stepfamily knows of this secret fortune and some go to great lengths to discover its whereabouts, while others pretend to befriend him in order to wrangle Fella's fortune away once it is found.

Princess Charming of the Grand Duchy of Morovia is in town, so the stepmother decides to throw her a lavish ball in order to get her to marry Rupert. Fella is not allowed to go to the ball, but his fairy godfather says he will not remain a "people" much longer, but will blossom into a "person."

Before the ball, Fella is turned into a handsome prince. Count Basie's orchestra is playing at the ball when Fella makes his grand entrance. Fella quickly gains the attention of the princess and they dance. The night is cut short when midnight strikes and Fella flees, losing his shoe along the way.

Back home, one of Fella's stepbrothers realizes that Fella is the supposed "prince." They wind up in a struggle under a tree and discover that the fortune is hidden there. Fella, who had always known where the money was, gives it to his stepfamily, saying that he never needed money to be happy; he only wanted a family. Shamed, his stepmother orders her sons to return the money to Fella.

The princess arrives with Fella's lost shoe, but Fella explains that they could never be together because she is a "person" and he is a "people." She tells him that, underneath the fancy clothes, she is a "people" too.

== Cast ==
- Jerry Lewis as Fella
- Anna Maria Alberghetti as Princess Charming
- Judith Anderson as Emily
- Ed Wynn as Fairy Godfather
- Henry Silva as Maximillian
- Robert Hutton as Rupert
- Count Basie as Bandleader

== Production ==
Cinderfella was filmed from October 19 through December 15, 1959.

While rehearsing for the scene in which he makes his entrance to the ball, Lewis realized that the movement of his pants was distracting. On the day of filming, he asked the wardrobe staff to attach elastic bands (stirrups) to the hems of his pant legs that would go under his shoes, keeping the pants straight. In the DVD commentary to the film, Lewis called this "an old dancer's trick." The scene was shot with one take of Lewis descending the stairs and another as he ascended. After running up the stairs in less than nine seconds and collapsing at the top, Lewis was taken to the hospital and spent four days in an oxygen tent, having suffered his second cardiac event. This delayed filming for two weeks.

The exterior shots of the mansion are those of Chartwell Mansion in Bel Air, which would later be used in The Beverly Hillbillies.

The film's budget has been estimated at $3,000,000.

Box-office returns were $4,700,000.

== Studio cast recording ==
A studio cast album for the film, featuring Lewis with a different supporting cast, was released by DOT Records (DLP 38001). Most of the songs included on the album were not in the final release of the film. The album featured a condensed version of the story as well.

Track listing

1. Overture (Arranged and Conducted by Walter Scharf)
2. Let Me Be a People (Jerry Lewis)
3. Ticka-Dee (Jerry Lewis)
4. I'm Part of a Family (Jerry Lewis)
5. Turn It On (Jerry Lewis & Choir)
6. We're Going to the Ball (Salli Terri, Bill Lee & Max Smith)
7. Somebody (Jerry Lewis)
8. The Princess Waltz (Jerry Lewis, Loulie Jean Norman & Choir)
9. Turn It On (Jerry Lewis, Del Moore & Choir)

== Release ==
Paramount wanted to release Cinderfella during the summer, but Lewis considered it a holiday film and wanted to hold it back for a Christmas release. To delay the release, Paramount demanded another film in its place for the summer. Lewis agreed and wrote, produced and directed The Bellboy in four weeks in February 1960 while he was performing at the Fontainebleau Hotel in Miami Beach. The Bellboy was released on July 20, 1960.

Cinderfella opened at the Woods Theatre in Chicago on November 22, 1960, grossing $41,000 in its first week. It opened in Los Angeles on December 14 and New York on December 16 before opening nationally on December 18, becoming the top-grossing film for the week.

In 1967, Cinderfella was rereleased on a double bill with another Lewis film, The Errand Boy.

== Critical reception ==
The New York Times said, "Judging by "CinderFella," one of the dullest comedies of the season — make that the year — Jerry Lewis by now has become fascinated with the very sound of his own breathing."

DVD Talk wrote, "Cinderfella is innocuous enough to function as harmless weekend entertainment for the family, but despite its lavishness Lewis was better served in small-scale comedies like The Bellboy."
