= Harold Lloyd Estate =

Historic house in California, United States

- Greenacres – Harold Lloyd Estate
- U.S. National Register of Historic Places
- California Historical Landmark
- Los Angeles Historic-Cultural Monument
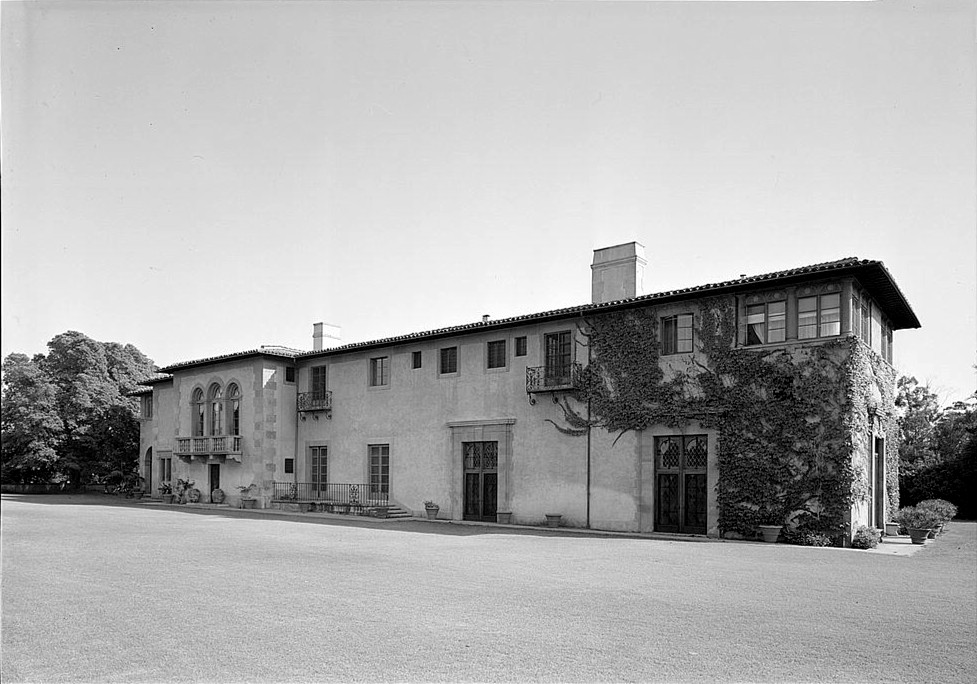
- Greenacres, Harold Lloyd Estate in 1974

- Location within the Los Angeles metropolitan area Location within California Location within the United States
- Location: 1740 Green Acres Drive, Beverly Hills, California; 34°5′17″N 118°25′37″W
- Built: 1928
- Architect: Webber, Staunton & Sumner Spaulding
- Landscape architect: A.E. Hanson
- Architectural style: Mediterranean Revival architecture
- NRHP reference No.: 84000876
- CHISL No.: 961
- LAHCM No.: 279

Significant dates
- Added to NRHP: February 9, 1984
- Designated LAHCM: July 24, 1984

The Harold Lloyd Estate, also known as Greenacres, is a large mansion and landscaped estate located in the Benedict Canyon section of Beverly Hills, California. Built in the late 1920s by silent film star Harold Lloyd, it remained Lloyd's home until his death in 1971.

The estate originally consisted of a 44-room mansion, golf course, outbuildings, and 900-foot (270 m) canoe run on 15 acres (61,000 m^{2}). Greenacres has been called "the most impressive movie star's estate ever created." After Lloyd died, the acreage in the lower part of the estate along Benedict Canyon was subdivided into approximately 15 large home lots. The mansion, on top of its own hill, retained approximately 5 original acres of flat land. It was added to the National Register of Historic Places in 1984.

== Planning and construction ==
In May 1923, Lloyd purchased land located at the mouth of Benedict Canyon in Beverly Hills from P.E. Benedict. The property had been owned by the Benedict family for more than 60 years. Lloyd paid $100,000 for the property. The site was close to the spot where Mary Pickford and Douglas Fairbanks had built their famed Pickfair estate.

In August 1925, Lloyd announced plans to build a $1 million estate on the 15-acre site, including a three-story French-Italian Renaissance home, a nine-acre golf course, a 50' x 150' swimming pool (the largest in southern California), an open-air theater, dance pavilion, tennis courts, and bridle path. Walter Weber and Sumner Spaulding (Weber, Staunton and Spalding) was hired as the architect. Lloyd also hired landscape engineer A.E. Hanson to execute plans for the "largest initial private landscaping project ever attempted" in the Los Angeles area. The plans included extensive gardens, a children's playground, and a stream fed by a well with water pumped to the top of a hill and then cascading through the property and creating water hazards in the golf course.

Final plans for the house were published in the Los Angeles Times in July 1927. The home was described as French–Italian Renaissance design with interiors inspired by the Villa Palmieri near Florence. Construction of the mansion began in July 1927 and was completed in 1928.

The 44-room, 45,000-square-foot (4,200 m^{2}) house and estate was said to have cost $2 million.

=== Features ===
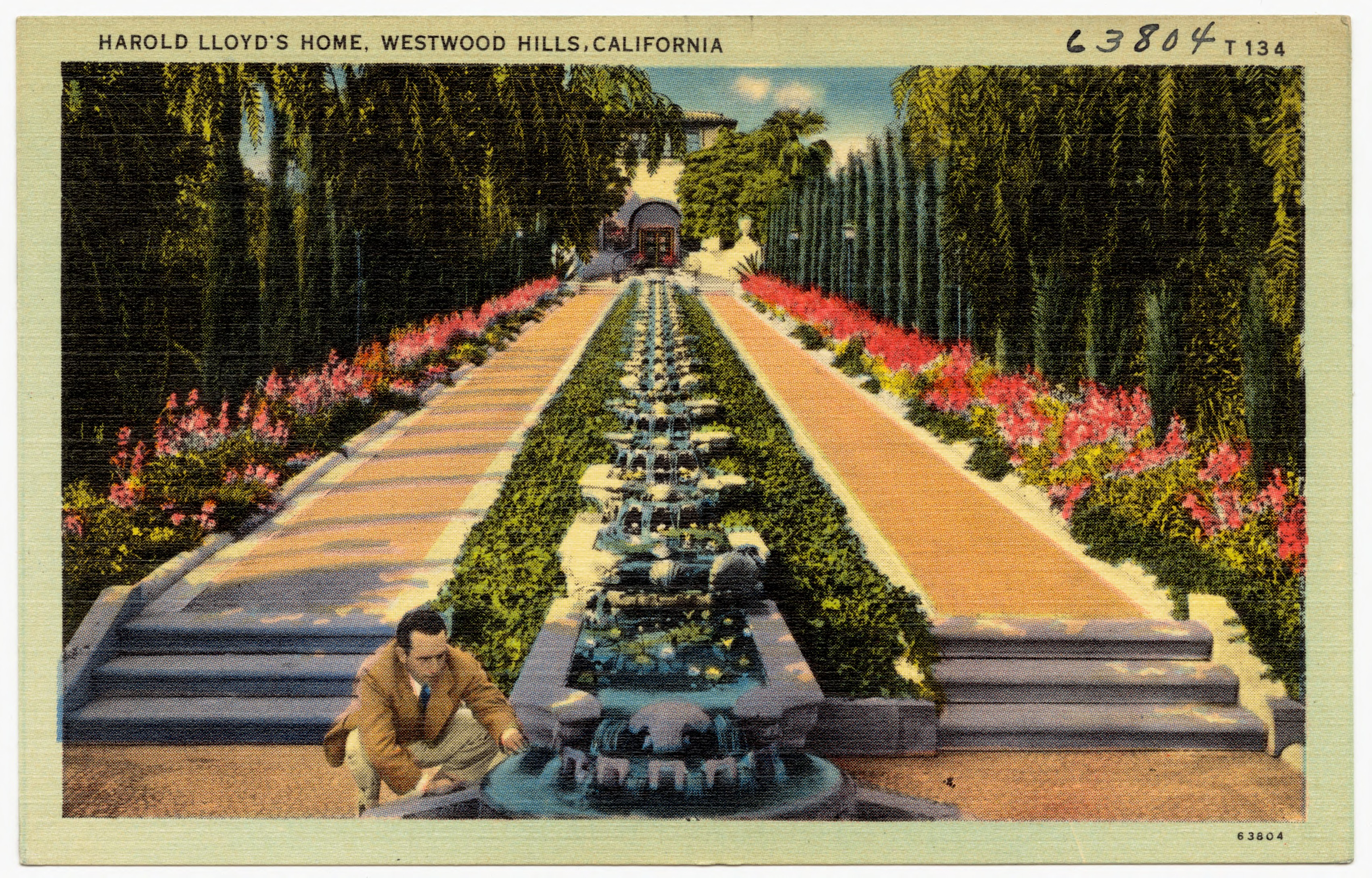
Cascading fountains on the estate

A.E. Hanson, Lloyd's landscape architect, transformed the 15-acre (61,000 m^{2}) site with the Villa Lante and Villa Medici as inspiration in Mediterranean Revival and Spanish Revival style motifs. The Los Angeles Times published a full-page illustrated article describing it as a "gorgeous fairyland playground" and a "Modern Eden of groves and gardens." The elaborate design of the grounds' landscape and gardens included the following elements:

- A private nine-hole regulation golf course.
- A 900-foot (270 m) canoe stream stocked with trout and bass, and a 100-foot (30 m) waterfall that plummeted into the canoe stream.
- The largest swimming pool in Southern California, measuring 50 feet (15 m) by 150 feet (46 m), and said to be "one of the finest swimming pools in the west." (The pool was surrounded by a tunnel with underwater windows to view and photograph swimmers.) The technology of filtering water and adding chlorine for swimming pools was very new at the time of construction and this huge pool at Greenacres was a modern marvel. Lloyd famously photographed Marilyn Monroe several times at this pool.
- Numerous gardens, including small tropical forests, sunken gardens, formal gardens, rose gardens, Italian gardens, and terraced gardens.

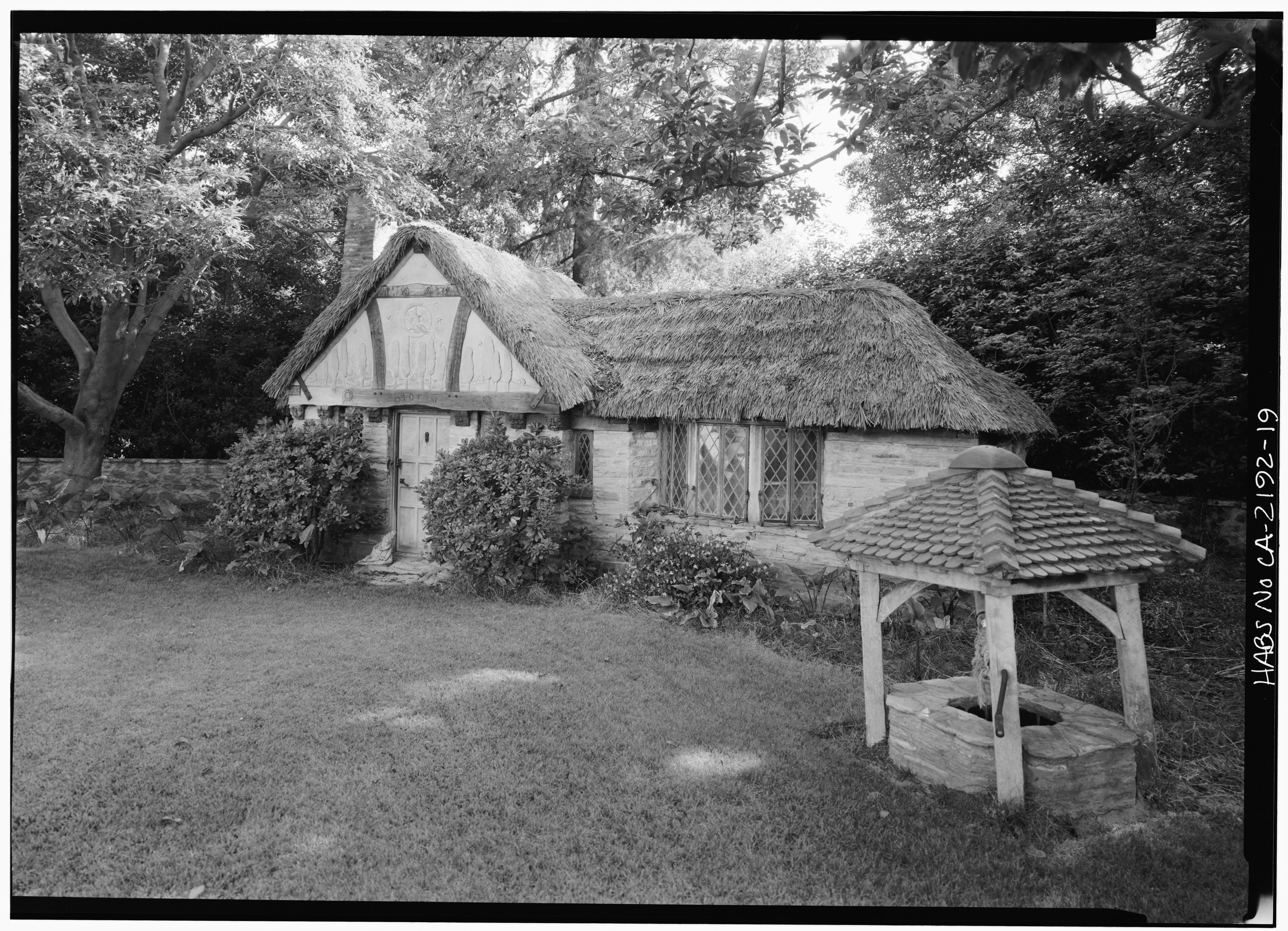
The thatched four-room old English-style house that was built within the "fairyland estate" for Lloyd's four-year-old daughter.

- Stables for horses, cattle and sheep, and a small farm for the estate's fruits and vegetables, including greenhouses for growing flowers.
- An open-air theater and dancing pavilion.
- Two film vaults within the grounds to store original copies of Lloyd's works, prints and negatives.
- Tennis courts, an outdoor bowling green, and a handball court. (Lloyd was a national handball champion and reportedly spent many hours there.)
- An automobile entrance court designed as a 120-foot (37 m) square, surrounded on two sides by a cloister.

The landscaping project was so large that 3,500 tons of sandstone were taken from quarries in Chatsworth and trucked to the site for use in building the steps, terraces, and waterfalls.

An unusual feature was the separate fairyland estate that Lloyd and A.E. Hanson designed for Lloyd's four-year-old daughter, Mildred Gloria. The play village had its own private gate with a sign reading, "Come into my garden and play." The fairyland estate included a four-room miniature old English house, a miniature old English stable with a pony and cart, Great Dane dogs, a wishing well with water for the daughter's garden, a slide, acrobatic devices and a swing. The miniature house had electricity and a kitchen and bath with running water, where the Lloyds' daughter played with friends, including Shirley Temple.

== Family home ==
Lloyd named his estate Greenacres, and it became a gathering place for the Lloyds' family and friends. Sundays were known as "at home" day at Greenacres:

The 'at home' day at Greenacres was Sunday when 30 or 40 friends would gather in the afternoon, amuse themselves with golf, tennis or handball, swimming, or with leisurely strolls through the gardens. A buffet would be set in the formal dining room and in the evening Lloyd would show a movie. Then he would wave everyone goodnight.

In 1937, Mrs. Lloyd hosted a bridal shower at the estate for Jeanette MacDonald attended by Hollywood's elite, including Ginger Rogers, Mary Pickford, Irene Dunne, Fay Wray, Norma Shearer, Dolores del Río, Loretta Young, Mervyn LeRoy, Ernst Lubitsch, Hal Roach, and Darryl Zanuck.

Greenacres was built in the 1920s in Beverly Hills, one of Los Angeles's all-white planned communities. The area had restrictive covenants prohibiting nonwhites (this also included Jews) from living there unless they were in the employment of white residents (typically as domestic servants). Several published accounts have described Lloyd as a leader or participant in neighborhood organizations around his estate that wanted to enforce restrictive covenants in the area.

With the demise of his movie career and loss of income, Lloyd had difficulty maintaining the estate. In 1943, he petitioned the Los Angeles County Board of Supervisors to reduce his property taxes because, although he and his family wanted to continue living there, he said the taxes were "eating them out of house and home." The Board agreed to reduce the valuation of the improvements to $100,000. Lloyd was forced to reduce the estate's staff, and parts of the estate began to deteriorate from neglect.

In August 1943, an explosion and fire at the home destroyed original negatives of his silent film comedies. Lloyd valued the damage to the films at $2 million. Lloyd rushed to the film vault on hearing the explosion and was rescued by his wife, Mildred Davis Lloyd, who caught him as he collapsed in a doorway to the vault and dragged him to safety. Seven firefighters and the estate's head gardener were hospitalized after being overcome by fumes from the burning films and chlorine gas from the pool's water treatment plant. The fire also damaged Lloyd's gymnasium and four-wall handball court.

In his later years, Lloyd lived a private life on his estate. He would start each day with a jog around the grounds, followed by a swim in the pool. He also developed an "addiction to stereo that shook the mansion at 3 am with the force of 10 speakers in unison"; the decibel levels caused the gold leaf to fall from the ornate living room ceiling.

Lloyd lived at the estate until he died of cancer in 1971, aged 77. A long-time member of staff noted that he had a superstitious fear of being driven around the Italian fountain in the estate's front court, always making his chauffeur back up rather than circle the fountain. However, "the only time he ever went around that fountain was the night he died."

== Legacy ==
=== Preservation attempts ===
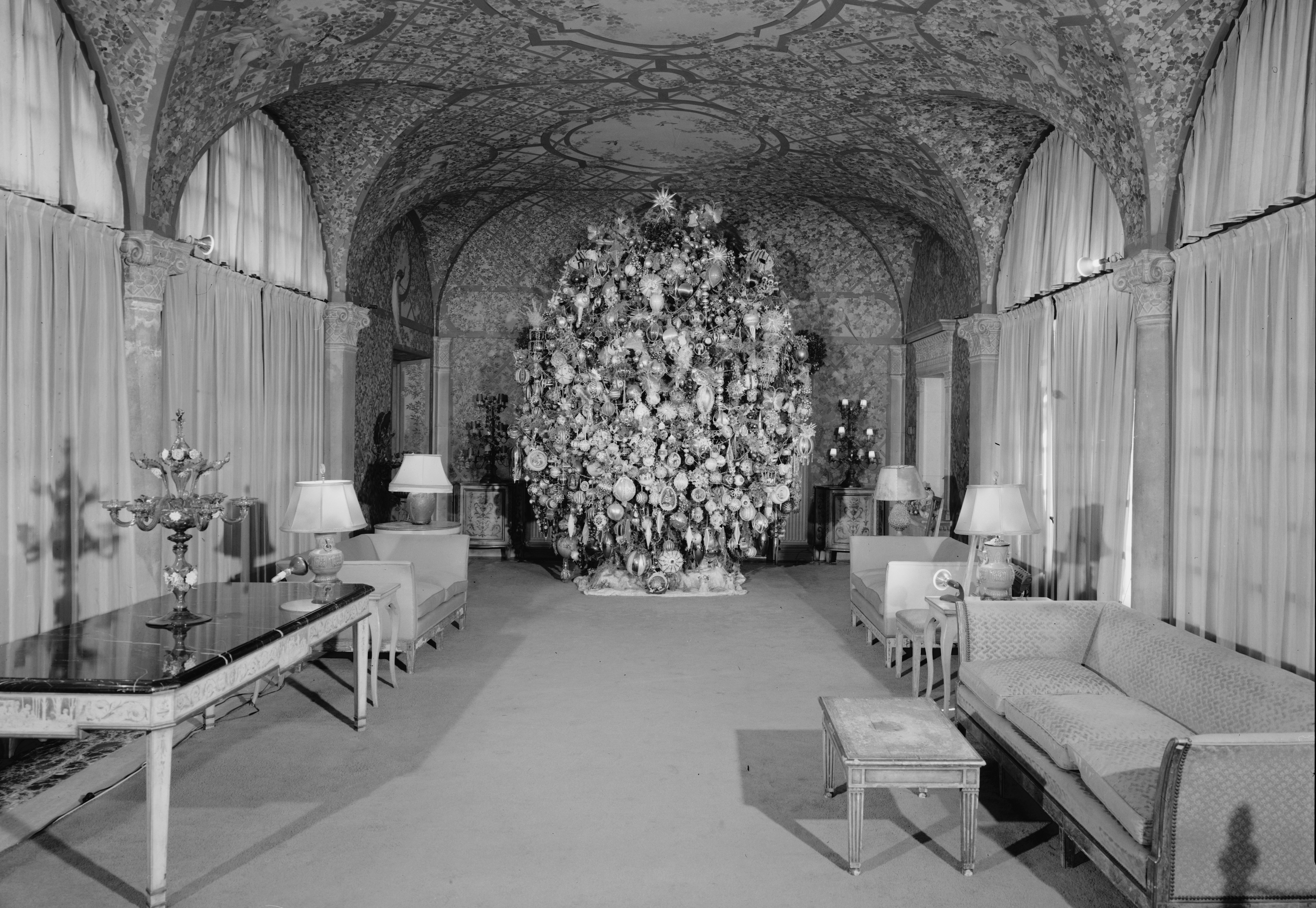
Christmas tree in 1974

Lloyd left his Benedict Canyon estate to the "benefit of the public at large" with instructions that it be used "as an educational facility and museum for research into the history of the motion picture in the United States." For a few years the home was open to public tours, but financial and legal obstacles prevented the estate from creating the motion picture museum that Lloyd had intended. Among other things, neighboring homeowners in the wealthy community were opposed to the creation of a museum hosting parties and attracting busloads of tourists.

In October 1972, the Los Angeles Times visited the property and noted that it had "the feel of Sunset Boulevard," bringing to mind the line spoken by the young writer when he first visits Norma Desmond's home: "It was the kind of place that crazy movie people built in the crazy 20s." The house appeared to visitors in the 1970s to be frozen in time at 1929. One writer noted that nothing had been moved or replaced, changed, or modernized, from the books in the library to the appliances in the kitchen and the fixtures in the bathrooms. Columnist Jack Smith visited the estate in 1973 and wrote that "time stood still", as Lloyd's clothes still hung in his closet, and the master bedroom and living room "looked like a set for a movie of the 1930s." A Renaissance tapestry presented to Lloyd as a housewarming gift by Mary Pickford and Douglas Fairbanks was still hanging in the hallway.

The house also had Lloyd's permanent Christmas tree loaded with ornaments at the end of a long sitting room. Jack Smith described the tree as follows:

[A]t the end of the room, dominating it like some great Athena in a Greek temple, stood the most fantastic Christmas tree I had ever seen. It reached the ceiling, a great, bulbous mass of colored glass baubles, some of them as big as pumpkins, clustered together like gaudy jewels in some monstrous piece of costume jewelry.

=== Sale and break-up ===
Unable to establish a museum, the estate was sold at auction in 1975. The entire property, including grounds and furnishings, was purchased by a retired Iranian businessman, Nasrollah Afshani, for $1.6 million. Afshani subdivided the estate into approximately 15 lots in addition to the mansion, with individual lots selling for as much as $1.2 million.

The mansion was preserved on a smaller 5-acre (20,000 m^{2}) parcel and sold for $3 million in 1979 to Bernard C. Solomon, the president of Everest Record Group. In 1986, Ted Field, heir to the Marshall Field department store chain and head of Interscope Films, bought the property for $6.5 million and lived there with his wife and their three children. The Fields extensively updated and renovated the entire home and grounds and added a pool back to the site. (The original pool located down closer to Benedict Canyon had been lost in the 1975 subdividing of the property.) Restoring everything except the original theater-size forty-rank pipe organ (which remains today behind the walls of the 80-foot (24 m) living room), the Field family replaced all the electrical wiring and plumbing and modernized the kitchens and bathrooms before moving into the estate. An 80-year-old carousel with hand-carved horses was added to the children's play yard.

In 1993, billionaire Ron Burkle bought the home for $20 million – $19 million less than the $39 million asking price (which had included a valuable art collection of old masters' paintings in the original asking price) but still among the highest prices paid for a home in the United States in the previous three years.

As of May 1997, the estate was being occupied by film actress Barbara Rush.

In 2001, the mansion was estimated to be worth $50–60 million.

The main house and the estate's principal gardens are frequently used for civic fundraising events and as a filming location, appearing in films such as Commando and Westworld.

== California Historical Landmark Marker ==
California Historical Landmark Marker No. 961 designation for the site states:

- O. 961 HAROLD LLOYD ESTATE (GREENACRES) - Greenacres, one of the greatest estates of Hollywood's Golden Era, was built in 1929 for the internationally known silent screen comedian, Harold Lloyd. With its formal gardens, it is one of the finest Mediterranean/Italian Renaissance style residential complexes remaining in the state. The 44-room house was designed by Sumner Spaulding and the gardens planned by A. E. Hansen. The estate is patterned after the Villa Gamberaia near Florence, Italy.

== See also ==
- Virginia Robinson Gardens in Beverly Hills
- List of Registered Historic Places in Los Angeles County, California
