= Chartwell Mansion =

Mansion in Los Angeles, California

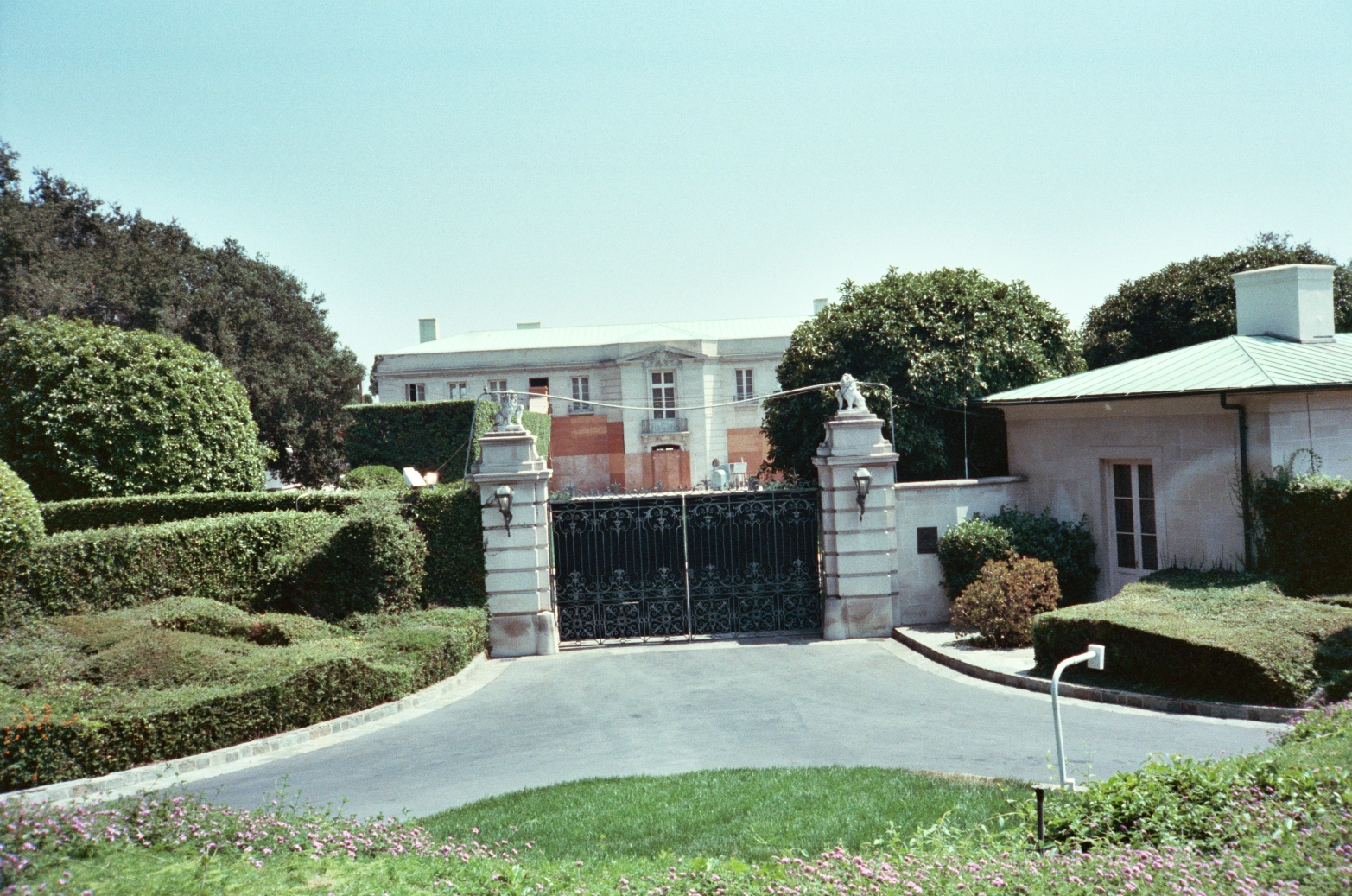
- 750 Bel Air Road in 1988, after it was bought by Jerry Perenchio from the family of Arnold Kirkeby. This gate has since been closed and the entry moved to 875 Nimes Road.
- Interactive map of the Chartwell Mansion area

General information
- Architectural style: Châteauesque
- Location: 750 Bel Air Road, Los Angeles, CA, United States
- Coordinates: 34.0870412°N 118.4421269°W
- Completed: 1933

Design and construction
- Architect: Sumner Spaulding

The Chartwell Mansion is a Chateauesque mansion in Bel-Air, California. Built in 1933, it is best known for its role as the Clampett family home in the 1960s television sitcom The Beverly Hillbillies. It was the most expensive home for sale in the United States in 2018.

== History ==
The house was designed by Sumner Spaulding in 1933 in the style of a French chateau. It was built for engineer and contractor Lynn Atkinson, who commissioned the property for his wife. She found it "pretentious", so the couple never lived there. The house, decorated by Henri Samuel, is located on 10 acres (4 hectares). The gardens, designed by François Goffinet, feature cascades, ponds, a grove, a tennis court, swimming pools and pavilions. The estate later was owned by Arnold Kirkeby and then Jerry Perenchio.

Following Perenchio's acquisition of Ronald and Nancy Reagan's neighboring 666 St. Cloud Road home following Nancy Reagan's death in 2016, Perenchio would demolish the former Reagan house and build new property on the site to serve as part of Chartwell Mansion. However, property at the location of the former 668 St. Cloud Road Reagan home would be demolished by 2020.

In 2019 the mansion was sold to Lachlan Murdoch for about $150 million, which was the highest sale price for any house in California history.

== See also ==
- List of largest houses in the Los Angeles metropolitan area
- List of largest houses in the United States
