= The Beverly Hillbillies =

American television sitcom (1962–1971)

- Genre: Sitcom
- Created by: Paul Henning
- Starring: Buddy Ebsen; Irene Ryan; Donna Douglas; Max Baer Jr.; Raymond Bailey; Nancy Kulp
- Opening theme: "The Ballad of Jed Clampett" played by Lester Flatt and Earl Scruggs, sung by Jerry Scoggins
- Country of origin: United States
- Original language: English
- No. of seasons: 9
- No. of episodes: 274 (list of episodes)

Production
- Executive producers: Al Simon; Martin Ransohoff
- Camera setup: Single-camera
- Running time: 25 minutes
- Production companies: Filmways; CBS Productions

Original release
- Network: CBS
- Release: September 26, 1962 – March 23, 1971

Related
- Petticoat Junction; Green Acres

The Beverly Hillbillies episode 18: "Jed Saves the Drysdales' Marriage"

The Beverly Hillbillies is an American television sitcom that was broadcast on CBS from 1962 to 1971. It featured an ensemble cast including Buddy Ebsen, Irene Ryan, Donna Douglas and Max Baer Jr. as the Clampetts, a poor backwoods family from the Ozark Mountains who move to posh Beverly Hills, California, after striking oil on their land.

The show was produced by Filmways in association with CBS Productions and was created by Paul Henning. It was followed by two other Henning-inspired series on CBS: Petticoat Junction and its spin-off Green Acres, which reversed the rags-to-riches, country-to-city model of The Beverly Hillbillies.

The Beverly Hillbillies ranked among the top 20 most-watched programs on American television for eight of its nine seasons, ranking as the number-one series of the year during its first two seasons, with 16 episodes that still remain among the 100 most-watched television episodes in American history. It accumulated seven Primetime Emmy nominations during its run. It continues to be aired in syndicated reruns and its ongoing popularity spawned a media franchise, including a 1993 film adaptation by 20th Century Fox.

== Premise ==
The series starts with Jed Clampett, a poor, widowed hillbilly who lives with his daughter and mother-in-law near an oil-rich swamp in the Ozark Mountains.

The opening sequence shows Jed discovering oil while shooting at a rabbit, and the first episode shows the oil being found by a surveyor for the OK Oil Company. The company pays Jed many millions of dollars for the right to drill on his land. Jed's cousin Pearl Bodine prods him to move to California now that he is wealthy and pressures him to take her son Jethro along. The family moves into a mansion in upscale Beverly Hills, California, next door to Jed's banker, Milburn Drysdale and his wife, Margaret, who is appalled by the hillbilly Clampetts.

The Clampetts bring an unsophisticated, simple, moral lifestyle to the wealthy and sometimes superficial community. Double entendres and cultural misconceptions are the core of the sitcom's humor. Plots often involve Drysdale's outlandish efforts to keep the Clampetts' money in his bank and his wife's efforts to force them to leave. On several occasions, the family attempts to return to the mountains after Granny feels slighted by the citizens of Beverly Hills.

== Characters ==
Jed, Granny and Elly May appear in all 274 episodes. Jethro (272 episodes) does not appear in the last two episodes of the series.

=== Jed Clampett ===
Good-natured patriarch Jed Clampett (portrayed by Buddy Ebsen) has little formal education and is naive about the world outside the rural area where he lived, but he has a great deal of wisdom and common sense. His forebears are revealed in Season 1, Episode 25 to have come to the United States before the Mayflower arrived. However, he later hides the fact in order to avoid publicity and possible obligations.

Jed is the widower of Granny's daughter Rose Ellen (Ebsen was only five years younger than Irene Ryan). He is the son of Luke Clampett and his wife and has a sister named Myrtle. In Episode 13, it is revealed that Jed's grandfather was 98 when he married Jed's grandmother, who was 18. He is usually the straight man to Granny's and Jethro's antics.

=== Granny (Daisy Moses) ===
Daisy May Moses (portrayed by Irene Ryan in all 274 episodes), called Granny by all, is Jed's mother-in-law, although in the pilot episode, Drysdale names her as Jed's mother. She is a descendant of the Moses clan, who feuded with another family, the Bodkins, and drove them from Napoleon, Tennessee. In Season 9, Episode 23, Granny states that she is from Limestone, Tennessee.

Granny has an abrasive personality and is quick to anger but is often overruled by Jed. She is a devout Confederate and fancies herself a Baptist Christian ("dunked, not sprinkled"). A self-styled "M.D." ("mountain doctor"), Granny uses her "white lightning" brew as a form of anesthesia when performing painful treatments such as leeching or tooth-pulling. She often refers to the concoction as "rheumatis medicine". Like the other Clampetts, she is known to take things literally, having thought Mrs. Drysdale had turned herself into a bird using black magic and mistook an escaped kangaroo for a giant jackrabbit.

Paul Henning discarded the idea of making Granny Jed's mother, which would have changed the show's dynamics.

=== Elly May Clampett ===
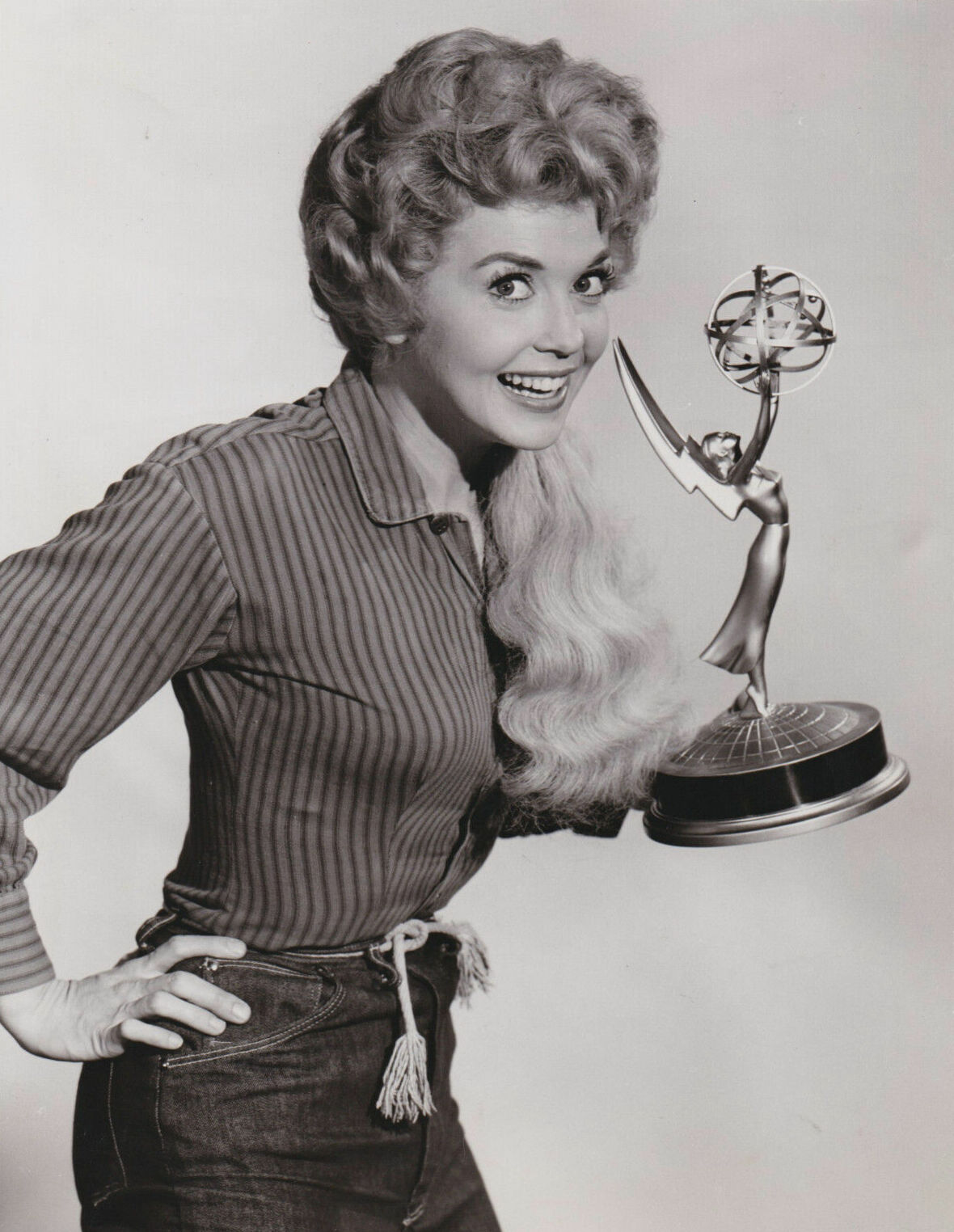
Donna Douglas as Elly May

Elly May (portrayed by Donna Douglas in all 274 episodes), the only child of Jed and Rose Ellen Clampett, is a mountain beauty with the soul of a tomboy. In an early episode, Jed tells Elly May that she is the spitting image of her mother. She can throw a fastball and "wrassle" most men to a fall; she can be tender with her friends, animals and family. Elly May says once that animals can be better companions than people. However, as she grows older, Elly May allows that "fellas kin be more fun than critters." In addition to the family dog, Duke (an old bloodhound), a number of pets live on the Clampett estate thanks to Elly May's love of animals.

She is a terrible cook and family members cringe whenever she takes over the kitchen. Elly May is easily in her 20s. However, Granny usually promotes her age as 14, as an unmarried mountain woman of Elly May's true age is considered an old maid.

In the 1981 reunion television movie, Elly May is the head of a zoo.

=== Jethro Bodine ===
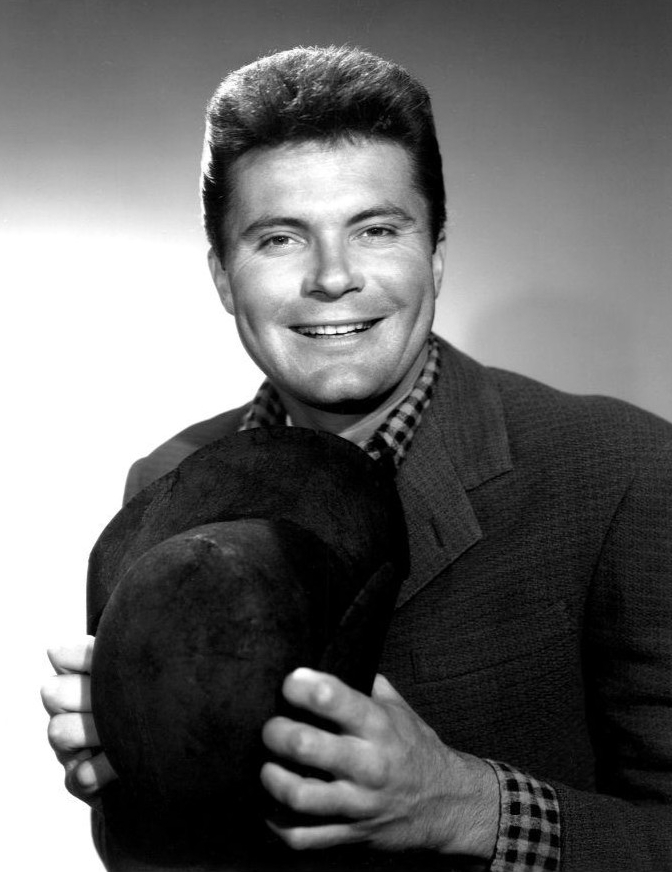
Max Baer Jr. as Jethro (1962)

Jethro (portrayed by Max Baer Jr. in 272 episodes) is the dimwitted son of Jed's cousin Pearl Bodine (in a customary practice, he addresses Jed, his once-removed elder cousin, as Uncle Jed, just as his second cousin, Elly May, addresses Jethro's mother as Aunt Pearl). Pearl's mother and Jed's father were siblings. Jethro drives the Clampett family to their new home in California and stays with them to further his education. In the first season, he is in the fifth grade, having spent three years in the fourth grade and two years in the first grade. The others boast of Jethro's "sixth-grade education". Jethro often speaks enthusiastically of his abilities in "cipherin'" (1 and 1 is 2, 2 and 2 is 4) and "gazintas" (4 gazinta 8 2 times, 3 gazinta 12 4 times), and he is ignorant about nearly every aspect of modern California life. In one episode, he attends a local secretarial school and is so disruptive that he is given a diploma at the end of the day to prevent him from returning. In real life, Max Baer Jr. has a bachelor's degree in business administration, minoring in philosophy, from Santa Clara University. He also is the son of former world heavyweight boxing champion Max Baer (boxer)

Many storylines involve Jethro's endless career search. He considers becoming a brain surgeon, a fry cook, a millwright, a street car conductor, a spy, a telephone lineman, a soda jerk, a chauffeur, a USAF general, a sculptor, a restaurant owner, a psychiatrist, a bookkeeper for Drysdale's bank, a talent agent and a Hollywood producer. His goal is often merely to meet pretty girls. Miss Hathaway has a crush on him, of which he is oblivious. Of all the Clampett clan, he is the most eager to embrace city life. Jethro has a huge appetite.

When Donna Douglas died in 2015, Baer became the last surviving cast member.

=== Milburn Drysdale ===
Milburn Drysdale (portrayed by Raymond Bailey in 247 episodes) is the Clampetts' banker, confidant and next-door neighbor. He is obsessed with money and to keep the Clampetts' $96 million (in 1969; equivalent to $630 million in 2024) in his Commerce Bank of Beverly Hills, Mr. Drysdale will go to great lengths to cater to their wishes. He often forces others, especially his long-suffering secretary, to help fulfill their outlandish requests. He is a descendant of the Bodkins family from Tennessee. It is revealed in the first season that Granny's clan, the Moses family, feuded with the Bodkins family and drove them from Napoleon, Tennessee. A recurring comedic scene shows Drysdale angrily answering his phone only to find Jed on the other end of the line, at which point Drysdale's demeanor instantly changes to one of good humor and accommodation.

=== Jane Hathaway ===
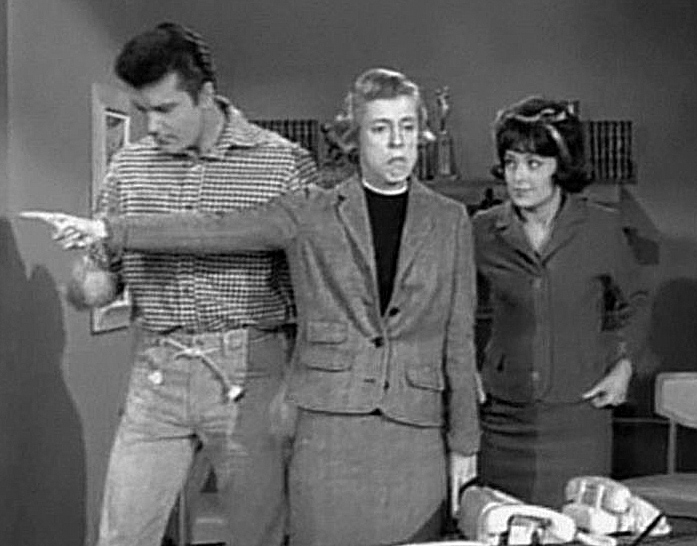
Nancy Kulp (center) as Jane Hathaway, with Max Baer Jr. and Sharon Tate (in a dark wig)

Jane Hathaway (portrayed by Nancy Kulp in 246 episodes), whom the Clampetts address as "Miss Jane", is Drysdale's loyal, well-educated, efficient secretary at the Commerce Bank of Beverly Hills. She has a degree from Vassar College, is fluent in French and knows Latin. She is genuinely fond of the family and tries to shield them from her boss's greed. Miss Hathaway must frequently rescue Drysdale from his schemes. The Clampetts consider her family, and even Granny, the one most averse to living in California, likes her. Jane has a crush on Jethro for most of the series' run. In 1999, TV Guide ranked Jane Hathaway number 38 on its list titled "50 Greatest TV Characters of All Time".

=== Recurring characters ===
- Margaret Drysdale (portrayed by Harriet MacGibbon in 55 episodes) is the snobbish wife of Milburn Drysdale. She is appalled by the Clampetts and their hillbilly lifestyle. She touts herself as a "blue-blooded Bostonian" and repeatedly tries to drive the Clampetts out of Beverly Hills, without success.
- "Cousin" Pearl Bodine (portrayed by Bea Benaderet in 23 episodes) is Jethro's mother and Jed's first cousin. Pearl encouraged the Clampetts to move to Beverly Hills and is envious of their wealth. She attempts to achieve success through various schemes, including wooing oil man John Brewster and finding a wealthy husband for her daughter Jethrine.
- Jethrine Bodine (portrayed by Max Baer Jr., voiced by Linda Kaye Henning in 11 episodes) is the sister of Jethro and the daughter of Pearl.
- Shorty Kellems (portrayed by Shug Fisher in 17 episodes) is Jed's best friend who occasionally visits from back in Silver Dollar City. In one storyline, Drysdale mistakenly believes Shorty is richer than Jed and goes to great lengths to win his business.
- Helen Thompson (portrayed by Danielle Mardi in 17 episodes) is a British secretary at the Commerce Bank of Beverly Hills.
- Janet Trego (portrayed by Sharon Tate in 15 episodes) is a secretary at the Commerce Bank of Beverly Hills. She assists Jane Hathaway and is often the object of Jethro's romantic overtures.
- John Brewster (portrayed by Frank Wilcox in 14 episodes) is an oil executive from Tulsa whose company made Jed a millionaire after leasing Jed's land for oil production.
- Elverna Bradshaw (portrayed by Elvia Allman in 13 episodes) is Granny's rival from Silver Dollar City.
- Dash Riprock (portrayed by Larry Pennell in 10 episodes) is a conceited macho movie star employed by Mammoth Pictures. He often tries to win Elly May's affections to no avail.
- Mark Templeton (portrayed by Roger Torrey in nine episodes) is a frogman and the brother of Matthew Templeton who Granny thought was an actual frog.
- Ravenswood (portrayed by Arthur Gould-Porter in 8 episodes) is the Drysdale family's butler.
- Lawrence Chapman (portrayed by Milton Frome in 8 episodes) is the head of Mammoth Pictures that Jed owns.
- Parkins (portrayed by Barney Elmore in seven episodes) is the Drysdale family's chauffeur.
- Lester Flatt and Earl Scruggs (portrayed by themselves in seven episodes) are a music duo who are longtime friends of the Clampett family.
- John Faversham (portrayed by Richard Caldicot in seven episodes) is the majordomo of Clampett Castle in Kent, England.
- Gloria Buckles (portrayed by Bettina Brenna in six episodes) is a secretary at the Commerce Bank of Beverly Hills. She is not to be confused with the earlier secretary that appeared in "Granny's Spring Tonic".
- Shifty Shaffer/Honest John (portrayed by Phil Silvers in six episodes) is a con artist who the Clampetts often encounter.
- Homer Cratchit (portrayed by Percy Helton in six episodes) is a bookkeeper at the Commerce Bank of Beverly Hills.
- Shad (portrayed by Lloyd "Shad" Heller in six episodes) is a blacksmith in Silver Dollar City, and later its mayor.
- Gladys Flatt (portrayed by Joi Lansing in six episodes) is Lester Flatt's wife.
- Patricia Switzer (portrayed by Judith Jordan in five episodes) is a secretary at the Commerce Bank of Beverly Hills.
- Foster Phinney (portrayed by Charles Lane in five episodes) is Jane Hathaway's landlord.
- Dr. Roy Clyburn (portrayed by Fred Clark in five episodes) is a doctor who is often competing with Granny's medical skills.
- Sugar Jean Bell (portrayed by Jean Bell in five episodes)
- Lowell Redlings Farquhar, father-in-law of Milburn Drysdale (portrayed by Charlie Ruggles)

=== Appearing from Petticoat Junction and Green Acres ===
The following characters from Petticoat Junction and Green Acres made guest appearances in this show starting in season 7 and listed in order of appearance:

- Sam Drucker (portrayed by Frank Cady) is the proprietor of Drucker's General Store. He served as a love interest for Granny.
- Joe Carson (portrayed by Edgar Buchanan) is the current proprietor of the Shady Rest Hotel.
- Betty Jo Bradley (portrayed by Linda Kaye Henning) is the grandniece of Joe Carson.
- Steve Elliott (portrayed by Mike Minor) is a crop duster who is the husband of Betty Jo Bradley.
- Janet Craig (portrayed by June Lockhart) is a doctor who works at the Shady Rest Hotel.
- Billie Jo Bradley (portrayed by Meredith McRae) is the grandniece of Joe Carson.
- Bobbi Jo Bradley (portrayed by Lori Saunders) is the grandniece of Joe Carson.
- Oliver Douglas (portrayed by Eddie Albert) is an attorney-turned-farmer.
- Lisa Douglas (portrayed by Eva Gabor) is the wife of Oliver Douglas.
- Eb Dawson (portrayed by Tom Lester) is a farmworker for Oliver and Lisa who develops a crush on Elly May.
- Fred Ziffel (portrayed by Hank Patterson) is an elderly farmer.
- J. Homer Bedloe (portrayed by Charles Lane) is the vice-president of the C&FW (Chicago & Far Western) Railroad who Mr. Drysdale once hired to be his "troubleshooter".

== Episodes ==
Season	Episodes	Originally released		Rank	Rating
Season	Episodes	First released	Last released	Rank	Rating
1	36	September 26, 1962	May 29, 1963	1	36.0
2	36	September 25, 1963	June 10, 1964	1	39.1
3	34	September 23, 1964	June 9, 1965	12	25.6
4	32	September 15, 1965	May 18, 1966	7	25.9
5	30	September 14, 1966	April 19, 1967	7	23.4
6	30	September 6, 1967	April 3, 1968	12	23.3
7	26	September 25, 1968	March 26, 1969	10	23.5
8	26	September 24, 1969	March 18, 1970	18	21.7
9	24	September 15, 1970	March 23, 1971	—N/a	—N/a

== Theme music ==
The show's theme song, "The Ballad of Jed Clampett", was written by producer and writer Paul Henning and originally performed by bluegrass artists Foggy Mountain Boys, led by Lester Flatt and Earl Scruggs. The song is sung by Jerry Scoggins (backed by Flatt and Scruggs) over the opening and end credits of each episode. Flatt and Scruggs subsequently cut their own version of the theme (with Flatt singing) for Columbia Records; released as a single, it reached number 44 on the Billboard Hot 100 pop music chart and number one on the Billboard Hot Country chart (the lone country chart-topper for the duo).

As was customary in the early 1960s, the show's advertising sponsors were woven into bumpers involving the cast. To this end, the show sometimes included extra verses of the theme song about Winston cigarettes and Kellogg's cereals.

Perry Botkin composed many songs for The Beverly Hillbillies.

The six main cast members participated on a 1963 Columbia soundtrack album, which featured original song numbers in character.

Flatt and Scruggs appear as themselves and play music on some episodes, and country musician Roy Clark (playing Cousin Roy) played on others. Pop singer Pat Boone appears in one episode as himself, under the premise that he hails from the same area of the country as the Clampetts.

The 1989 film UHF featured a "Weird Al" Yankovic parody music video, "Money for Nothing/Beverly Hillbillies*", combining "The Ballad of Jed Clampett" and English rock band Dire Straits' 1985 hit song "Money for Nothing".

== Reception ==
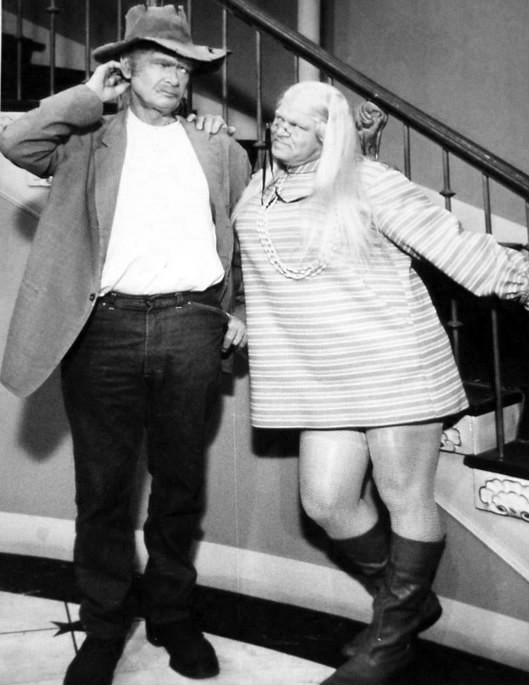
Buddy Ebsen and Roy Clark

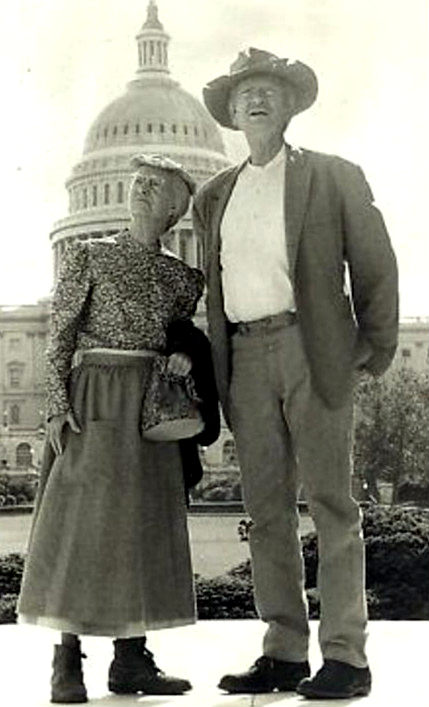
Irene Ryan and Buddy Ebsen in the Beverly Hillbillies episode "The Clampetts in Washington", 1970.

The Beverly Hillbillies received generally poor reviews from contemporary critics. The New York Times called the show "strained and unfunny"; Variety called it "painful to sit through". Gilbert Seldes wrote in TV Guide, "The whole notion on which The Beverly Hillbillies is founded is an encouragement to ignorance... But it is funny. What can I do?" CBS executives William S. Paley and Frank Stanton also disliked the show but did not interfere with the decisions of network head James T. Aubrey, whose preference for "hick-coms" such as The Beverly Hillbillies made CBS the dominant Big Three television network.

Regardless of the poor reviews, the show shot to the top of the Nielsen ratings shortly after its premiere and stayed there for several seasons. During its first two seasons, it was the number-one program in the US; during its second season, it earned some of the highest ratings ever recorded for a half-hour sitcom. The season-two episode "The Giant Jackrabbit" also became the most-watched telecast up to the time of its airing and remains the most-watched half-hour episode of a sitcom, as well. The series enjoyed excellent ratings throughout its run, although it had fallen out of the top 20 most-watched shows during its final season.

In 1997, the season-three episode "Hedda Hopper's Hollywood" was ranked number 62 on "TV Guide's 100 Greatest Episodes of All Time". Film professor Janet Staiger wrote that "the problem for these reviewers [who disliked the show] was that the show confronted the cultural elite's notions of quality entertainment". Media scholar Robert Thompson of Syracuse University described The Beverly Hillbillies as "the clash of folk art and greedy consumerism".

=== Nielsen ratings ===
Nielsen ratings for The Beverly Hillbillies
Season	Time	Rank	Rating	Notes
1 (1962–63)	Wednesday at 9:00–9:30 p.m.	1	36.0	
2 (1963–64)	Wednesday at 9:00–9:30 p.m.	1	39.1	
3 (1964–65)	Wednesday at 8:30–9:00 p.m.	12	25.6	
4 (1965–66)	Wednesday at 8:30–9:00 p.m.	7	25.9	Tied with Bewitched
5 (1966–67)	Wednesday at 8:30–9:00 p.m.	7	23.4	Tied with Daktari and Bewitched
6 (1967–68)	Wednesday at 8:30–9:00 p.m.	12	23.3	
7 (1968–69)	Wednesday at 9:00–9:30 p.m.	10	23.5	
8 (1969–70)	Wednesday at 8:30–9:00 p.m.	18	21.7	
9 (1970–71)	Tuesday at 7:30–8:00 p.m.	Not in the Top 30		

== Cancellation ==
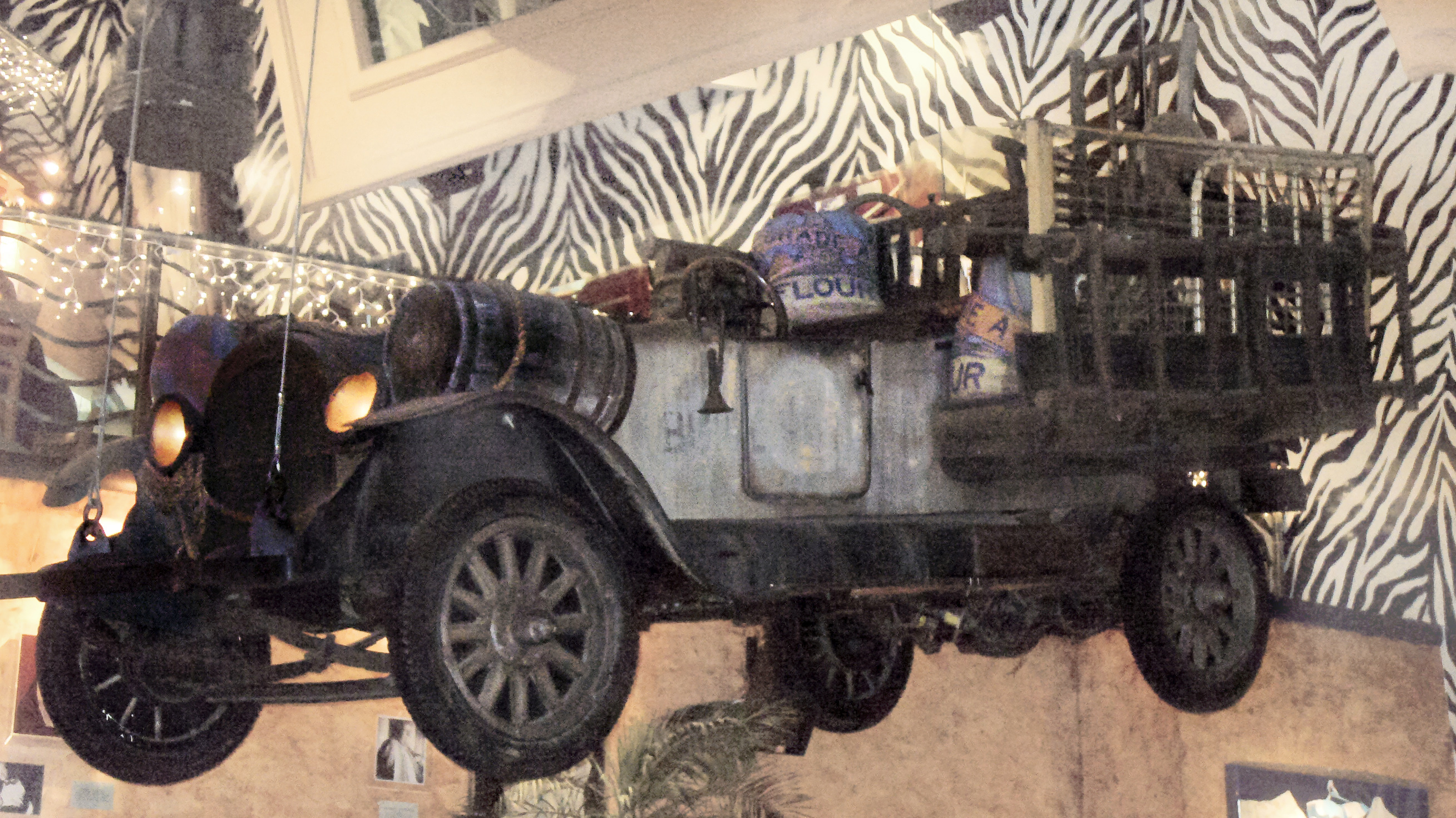
The Clampetts' truck is a 1921 Oldsmobile Model 37. This version, modified by George Barris, is on display at Planet Hollywood in Disney Springs, Florida. The original truck is at the Ralph Foster Museum in Point Lookout, Missouri.

The show was canceled in the spring of 1971 after 274 episodes. The CBS network, prompted by pressure from advertisers seeking a more sophisticated urban audience, refocused its schedule on new urban-themed shows and canceled its rural-themed comedies, an action known as the "rural purge". Pat Buttram, who played Mr. Haney on Green Acres, famously remarked, "It was the year CBS canceled everything with a tree—including Lassie."

== Reunions ==
=== 1981 CBS film ===
In 1981, Return of the Beverly Hillbillies television film, written and produced by series creator Henning, was aired on the CBS network. Irene Ryan had died in 1973, and Raymond Bailey had died in 1980. The script acknowledged Granny's passing, but featured Imogene Coca as Granny's mother. Max Baer decided against reprising the role that both started and stymied his career, so the character of Jethro Bodine was given to another actor, Ray Young.

The film's plot had Jed back in his old homestead in Bugtussle, having divided his massive fortune among Elly May and Jethro, both of whom stayed on the West Coast. Jane Hathaway had become a Department of Energy agent and was seeking Granny's "White Lightnin'" recipe to combat the energy crisis. Since Granny had gone on to "her re-ward", it was up to Granny's centenarian "Maw" (Imogene Coca) to divulge the secret brew's ingredients. Subplots included Jethro playing an egocentric, starlet-starved Hollywood producer, Jane and her boss (Werner Klemperer) having a romance, and Elly May owning a large petting zoo. The four main characters finally got together by the end of the story.

Though filmed only a decade after the series finale, viewer consensus found the movie lacked the series' original spirit. Hampered by the deaths of Ryan and Bailey, and Baer's absence, only three of the six original cast members reprised their roles. A further complication was that the "Clampett mansion" (the Chartwell Mansion, designed by Sumner Spaulding) had become too expensive for location shooting. Henning admitted embarrassment after the finished product aired, blaming his inability to rewrite the script due to the 1981 Writers Guild of America strike.

=== 1993 special ===
In 1993, Ebsen, Douglas, and Baer reunited onscreen for the only time in the CBS-TV retrospective television special, The Legend of the Beverly Hillbillies hosted by Mac Davis and written by Al Bendix, Tino Insana, and Mike Rowe while Dakin Matthews served as the field interviewer. This special was ranked as the fourth-most watched television program of the week—a major surprise given the mediocre rating for the 1981 television film. It was a rare tribute from the "Tiffany network", which owed much of its success in the 1960s to the series, but has often seemed embarrassed by it in hindsight, often downplaying the show in retrospective television specials on the network's history and rarely inviting cast members to participate in such all-star broadcasts.

The Legend of The Beverly Hillbillies special ignored several plot twists of the television film, notably that Jethro was now not a film director but a leading Los Angeles physician. Critter-loving Elly May was still in California with her animals. Jed was back home in the Hills where he declined interviews until now. He also mentioned how he got richer in the hills where he purchased some land and spends some of his days whittling. Nancy Kulp had died in 1991 and was little referred to beyond the multitude of film clips that dotted the special. When asked if he bears no grudge against Drysdale, Jed states "I never bear no grudge against any man. The way I see it, I lost some money, but Mr. Drysdale lost his freedom. I don't think I'm bad off at all." Jed then tells his interviewer that he goes into town to ring up Elly May and that Jethro brings his children around often. He then takes the man interviewing with him to meet some friends unaware that he struck oil again. The scene closes with Jed dancing to the theme song with Jerry Scoggins while Earl Scruggs and Roy Clark (who is substituting for the late Lester Flatt) playing the music. The special was released on VHS tape by CBS/Fox Video in 1995 and as a bonus feature on the Official Third Season DVD Set in 2009.

== Controversy ==
In 1974, CBS reportedly issued a large cash payment settlement to employee Hamilton Morgen, who had sued the network, claiming that CBS appropriated his ideas and script for a show titled Country Cousins to form The Beverly Hillbillies.

== Syndication ==
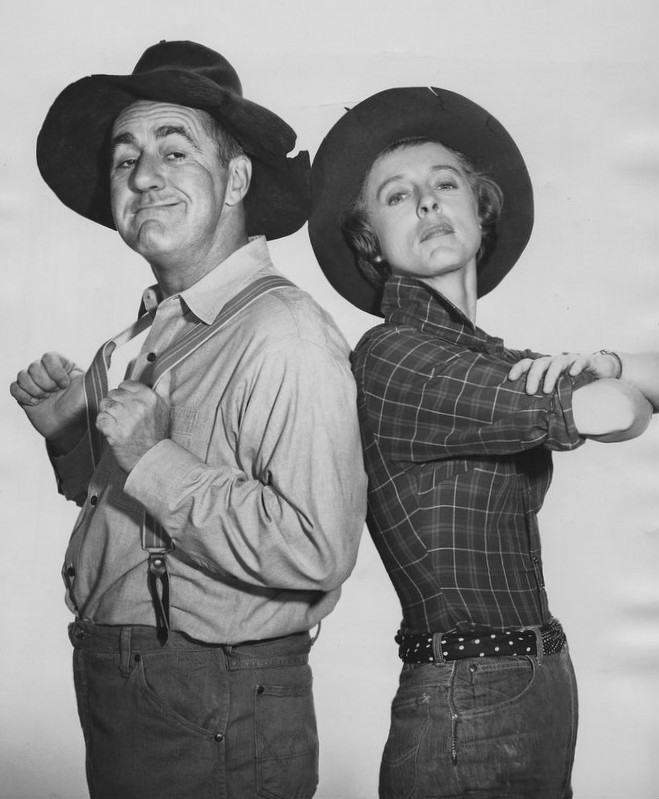
Guest star Jim Backus and Nancy Kulp in The Beverly Hillbillies (1963)

The Beverly Hillbillies is still televised daily around the world in syndication. In the United States, the show has been broadcast on MeTV, Circle, Classic Reruns TV, GAC Family, Laff, Catchy Comedy and FETV, and was previously on TBS Superstation, Nick at Nite, TV Land, Hallmark Channel and Superstation WGN. A limited number of public-domain episodes from the early series have been shown on smaller networks such as Retro TV and MyFamily TV.

The show is distributed by CBS Media Ventures, the syndication arm of CBS Television Studios and the CBS network. It was previously distributed by CBS Enterprises, Viacom Enterprises, Paramount Domestic Television and CBS Paramount Domestic Television (all through corporate changes involving distribution rights to the early CBS library).

== Home media and legal status ==
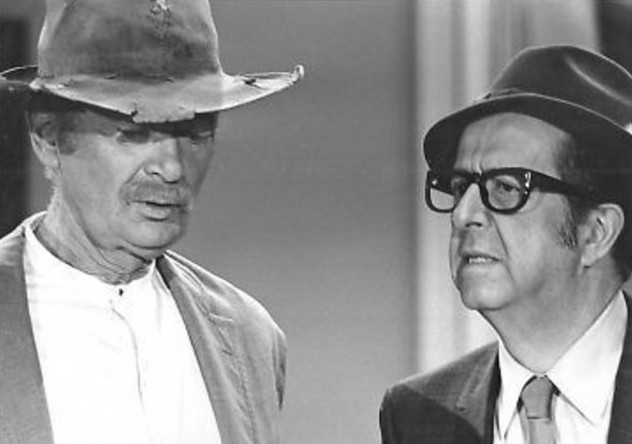
Buddy Ebsen and Phil Silvers

Fifty-five episodes of the series are in the public domain (all 36 Season 1 episodes and 19 Season 2 episodes) because Orion Television, successor to Filmways, neglected to renew their copyrights. As a result, these episodes have been released in home-video formats by low-budget labels and shown on television in 16-mm prints. In many video prints of the public-domain episodes, the original theme music has been replaced by generic music because of copyright issues.

Before his death, Paul Henning, whose estate now holds the original film elements to the public-domain episodes, authorized MPI Home Video to release the best of the first two seasons on DVD, and the first "ultimate collection" was released in the fall of 2005. These collections include the original, uncut versions of the first season's episodes, complete with their original theme music and opening sponsor plugs. Volume 1 has, among its bonus features, the alternate, unaired version of the pilot episode "The Hillbillies of Beverly Hills" (the version of the episode that sold the series to CBS) and television commercials featuring cast members pitching the products of the show's sponsors that were originally shown at the end of each episode. The alternate version is also that which may be seen on Amazon Prime Video.

With the exception of the public-domain episodes, the copyrights to the series were renewed by Orion Television. However, any new compilation of The Beverly Hillbillies material will be copyrighted by either MPI Media Group or CBS, depending on the content of the material used.

For many years, 20th Century Fox, through a joint venture with CBS called CBS/Fox Video, released select episodes of the show on videocassette. After Viacom merged with CBS in 1999, Paramount Home Entertainment took control of the video rights.

In 2006, Paramount announced plans to release the copyrighted episodes in boxed sets through CBS DVD later that year. The show's second season (consisting of the public-domain episodes from that season) was released on DVD in Region 1 on October 7, 2008. The third season was released on February 17, 2009. On October 1, 2013, Season 4 was released on DVD as a Walmart exclusive and as a full retail release on April 15, 2014. On April 26, 2016, CBS/Paramount released the complete first season on DVD. The fifth season was released on October 2, 2018.

DVD title	No. of episodes	Region 1 release date
The Beverly Hillbillies (Ultimate Collection)	26	September 27, 2005
The Beverly Hillbillies (Ultimate Collection Volume 2)	27	February 28, 2006
The Beverly Hillbillies (The Official First Season)	36	April 26, 2016
The Beverly Hillbillies (The Official Second Season)	36	October 7, 2008
The Beverly Hillbillies (The Official Third Season)	34	February 17, 2009
Return of the Beverly Hillbillies (TV Movie)	—	March 12, 2013
The Beverly Hillbillies (The Official Fourth Season)	32	April 15, 2014
The Beverly Hillbillies (The Official Fifth Season)	30	October 2, 2018

== Spin-offs and associated merchandise ==
=== Theatrical adaptation ===
A three-act stage play based on the pilot was written by David Rogers in 1968.

=== Comics ===
Dell Comics adapted the series into a comic book series in 1962. The artwork was provided by Henry Scarpelli. The comic ran for 18 issues, ending in August 1967.

=== Board and card games ===
Standard Toykraft released a board game based on the show called The Beverly Hillbillies Game. Milton Bradley released a card game called Set Back: The Beverly Hillbillies Card Game in 1963.

=== Trading cards ===
A set of trading cards based around the show were released by Topps in 1963 and Eclipse in 1993.

=== Feature film ===
In 1993, a film version of The Beverly Hillbillies was released starring Jim Varney as Jed Clampett and featuring Buddy Ebsen in a cameo as Barnaby Jones, the lead character in his long-running television series years after The Beverly Hillbillies had ended.

=== Computer game ===
Based on The Beverly Hillbillies movie, a PC computer adventure game for operating system MS-DOS was developed by Synergistic Software, Inc. and published in 1993 by Capstone Software.

=== The Real Beverly Hillbillies ===
In 2002, CBS planned a reality show based on the series in which a lower-middle-class, real-life rural family lives for one year in a mansion with all of the luxuries of the wealth and adjusts to life in Beverly Hills. In 2003, a group of Appalachian activists voiced their objections to the show, eventually joined in their protest by multiple trade unions and members of the U.S. House of Representatives. The show never aired.

== See also ==
- Chartwell Mansion
- Rural purge
