= Médan =

- Commune
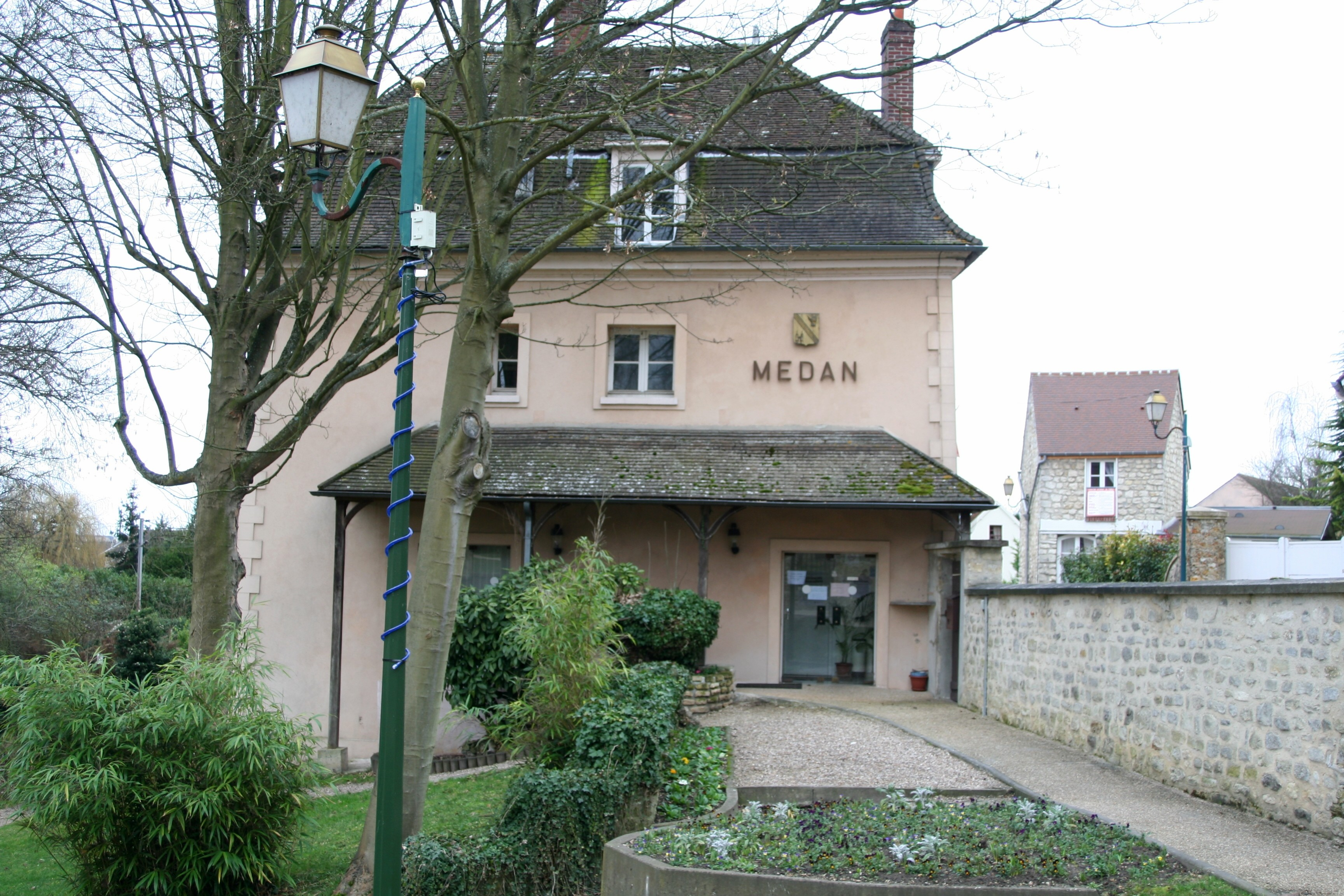
- Town hall

- Coat of arms
- Location of Médan
- Location within France Location within Île-de-France (region)
- Coordinates: 48°57′15″N 1°59′49″E
- Country: France
- Region: Île-de-France
- Department: Yvelines
- Arrondissement: Saint-Germain-en-Laye
- Canton: Verneuil-sur-Seine
- Intercommunality: CU Grand Paris Seine et Oise

Government
  - Mayor (2020–2026): Karine Kauffmann
- Area^{1}: 2.85 km^{2} (1.10 sq mi)
- Elevation: 63 m (207 ft)
- Highest elevation: 171 m (561 ft)
- Lowest elevation: 18 m (59 ft)
- Population (2023): 1,289
  - Density: 452/km^{2} (1,170/sq mi)
- Time zone: UTC+01:00 (CET)
  - Summer (DST): UTC+02:00 (CEST)
- INSEE/Postal code: 78384 /78670
- ^{1} French Land Register data, which excludes lakes, ponds, glaciers > 1 km^{2} (0.386 sq mi or 247 acres) and river estuaries.

Médan (French pronunciation: [medɑ̃]) is a village in the Yvelines department, Île-de-France region, in the northwestern suburbs of Paris, France, about 25 km from the capital. Inhabitants of Médan are called Médanais.

== Geography ==
Médan is located in the Seine valley, surrounded by the towns of Triel-sur-Seine to the northeast, Villennes-sur-Seine to the south, Orgeval and Morainvilliers to the southeast, and Vernouillet to the northwest. The village counts about 1,500 residents and has very little commercial activity. It is a bedroom community for people working in Paris. While the commune is partially urbanized, green space comprises 66% of the territory. It has a primary school, a Romanesque church (open from Easter to Toussaint) and a municipal meeting room (Salle Maeterlinck). Médan is divided by the secondary roads RD 164 and RD 154. Médan is also served by the highways A13 and A14 or by Poissy station of the RER line A and the Transilien Paris-Saint-Lazare suburban rail line at Villennes-sur-Seine.

== History and Culture ==
In the ninth century, the village was known as Magedon, and consisted of a feudal manor and 24 small houses.

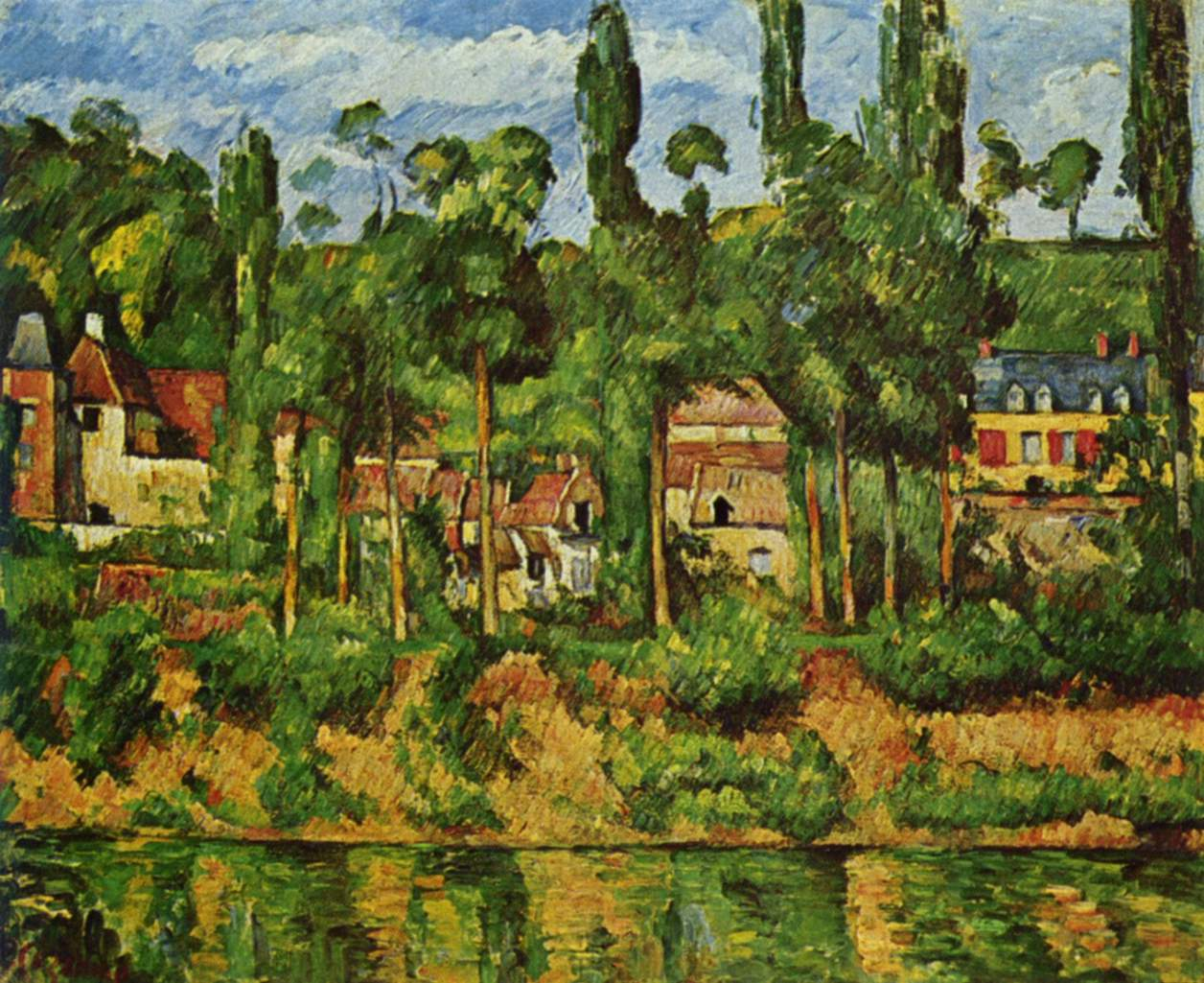
Cézanne, Château de Médan (1880)

=== The castle of Médan ===
The castle of Médan was built in the late fifteenth century. During the Renaissance, the castle was frequented by Pierre de Ronsard and the poets of the Pléiade (Du Bellay, Baïf ...) who came to hunt and write poems. Paul Cézanne painted it three times from 1879 to 1881.

Maurice Maeterlinck, who was awarded the Nobel Prize in Literature in 1911, moved to the castle in 1924 where he wrote La vie des Termites and L’Araignée de verre. The castle, abandoned after World War II and then damaged by fire in 1956, has been on the national registry of historical monuments since 1926. The newspaper «Combat» was printed there from 1966 to 1974. Today, the restored property is in private hands and open for visits by appointment only.

=== Émile Zola's House ===
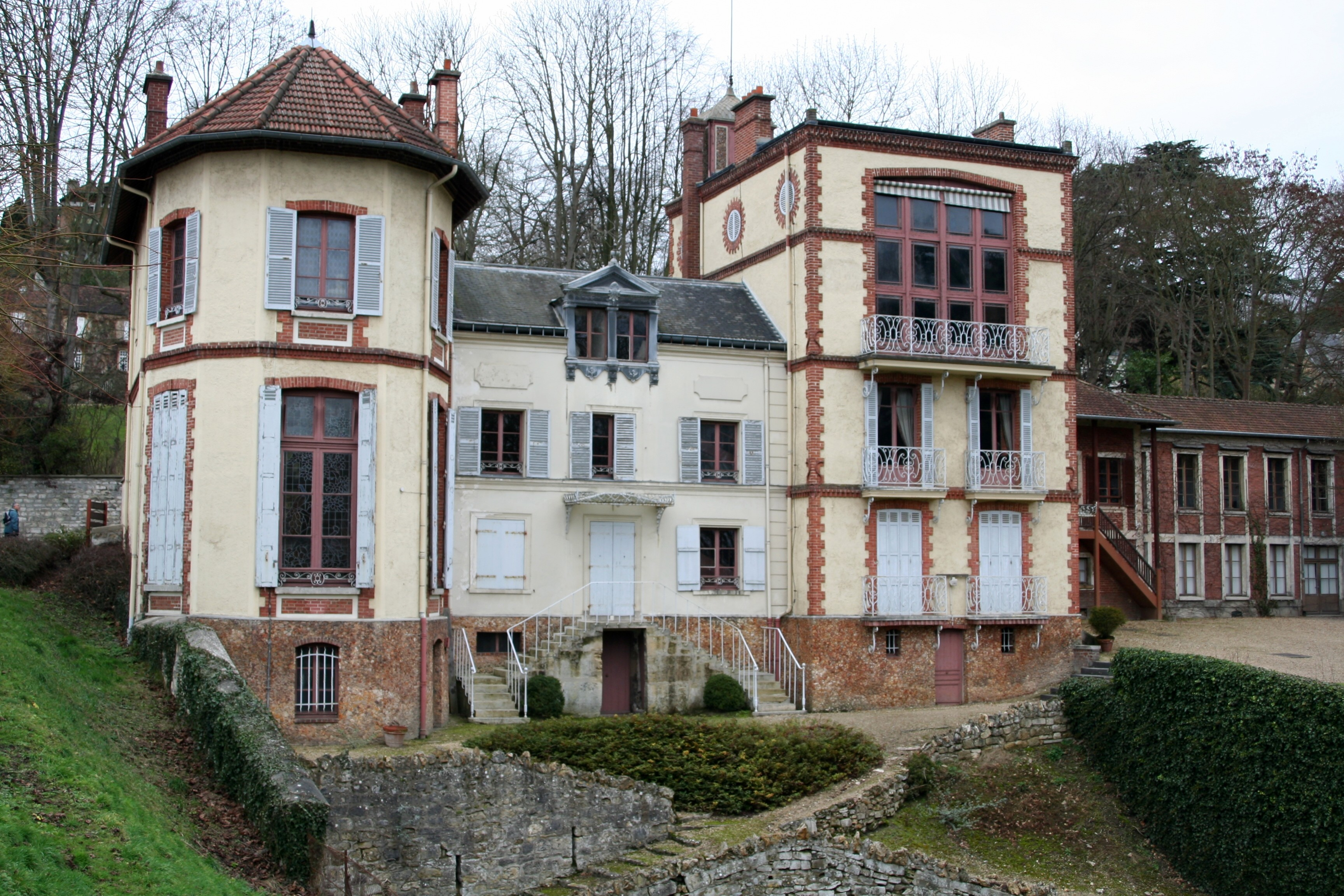
Émile Zola's House

Thanks to the success of L’Assommoir, French writer Émile Zola acquired a house in Médan in May 1878 that he referred to as a "rabbit hutch". Over three years, he transformed it into a manor house where he led a relaxed lifestyle, with his garden and farm. He designed the park of which he always dreamed.

During the summer in Médan, Zola hosted Cézanne, his childhood friend, and other artists such as Édouard Manet and Camille Pissarro, and naturalist writers such as Alphonse Daudet, Guy de Maupassant and J.K. Huysmans. The writers combined their efforts in a literary collection entitled Les soirées de Médan (Médan Evenings) (1880) named after the amusing evenings they had spent in Zola's home. Zola split his time between Médan and Paris, where he died on 28 September 1902.

In 1905, Alexandrine Zola, his widow, donated the house to a newly created Zola Foundation. It served as a convalescent home for children and eventually a nursing school before being turned into a museum in 1985. The property was taken in hand by the Association pour la Rayonnement de l'Œuvre d'Émile Zola (Association for the Promulgation of the Works of Émile Zola) in 1998. The Association, led by financier Pierre Bergé and his partner, fashion designer Yves St. Laurent, spearheaded efforts to restore the house, develop the museum, and add a wing dedicated to Alfred Dreyfus. Some 10,000 people visited the house and garden annually in the 2000s.

The Zola–Dreyfus Project construction led to closing the house to visits in 2011 for an anticipated four years. The project includes renovation of Émile Zola's house and the creation of the Dreyfus Museum, which will be a place for exhibiting and teaching, for debates and reflection, for memory and vigilance.

== See also ==
- Communes of the Yvelines department
