= Adeline Gousseau =

French politician

Member of the French Senate for Yvelines
- In office 26 September 2006 – 30 September 2007

Personal details
- Born: August 24, 1936 (age 90) Crespières, France
- Party: Union for a Popular Movement

Adeline Gousseau (born 24 August 1936) was a French politician who served in the French Senate from 2004 to 2007. She was a member of the Union for a Popular Movement.

== Early life ==
She was born in Crespières.

== Career ==
Before entering politics, Gousseau was a farmer in Les Alluets-le-Roi. She was elected in Yvelines on 26 September 2004. Gousseau resigned her seat on 30 September 2007. During her term in office, she served on the Commission des Affaires économiques. She also participated in 22 legislative proposals.

Gousseau served as deputy mayor for Les Alluets-le-Roi. She was regional president of a farming co-operative.
