= Canton of Saint-Nom-la-Bretèche =

Coordinates: 48.8506°N 2.0304°E

Saint-Nom-la-Bretèche
- Former canton
- Location within the Yvelines department
- Country: France
- Region: Île-de-France
- Department: Yvelines
- No. of communes: {{{nbcomm}}}
- Disbanded: 2015
- Area: 60.58 km^{2} (23.39 sq mi)
- Population (2012): 36,148
  - Density: 596.7/km^{2} (1,545/sq mi)

The Canton of Saint-Nom-la-Bretèche is a French former canton, located in the arrondissement of Saint-Germain-en-Laye, in the Yvelines département (Île-de-France région). It had 36,148 inhabitants (2012). It was disbanded following the French canton reorganisation which came into effect in March 2015.

== Municipalities ==
The canton included the following 8 communes:

- Saint-Nom-la-Bretèche (seat)
- Bailly
- Chavenay
- L'Étang-la-Ville
- Feucherolles
- Noisy-le-Roi
- Rennemoulin
- Villepreux

== See also ==
- Cantons of the Yvelines department
- Arrondissements of the Yvelines department
