= Arrondissement of Saint-Germain-en-Laye =

Coordinates: 48°54′07″N 2°05′00″E

Saint-Germain-en-Laye
- Arrondissement
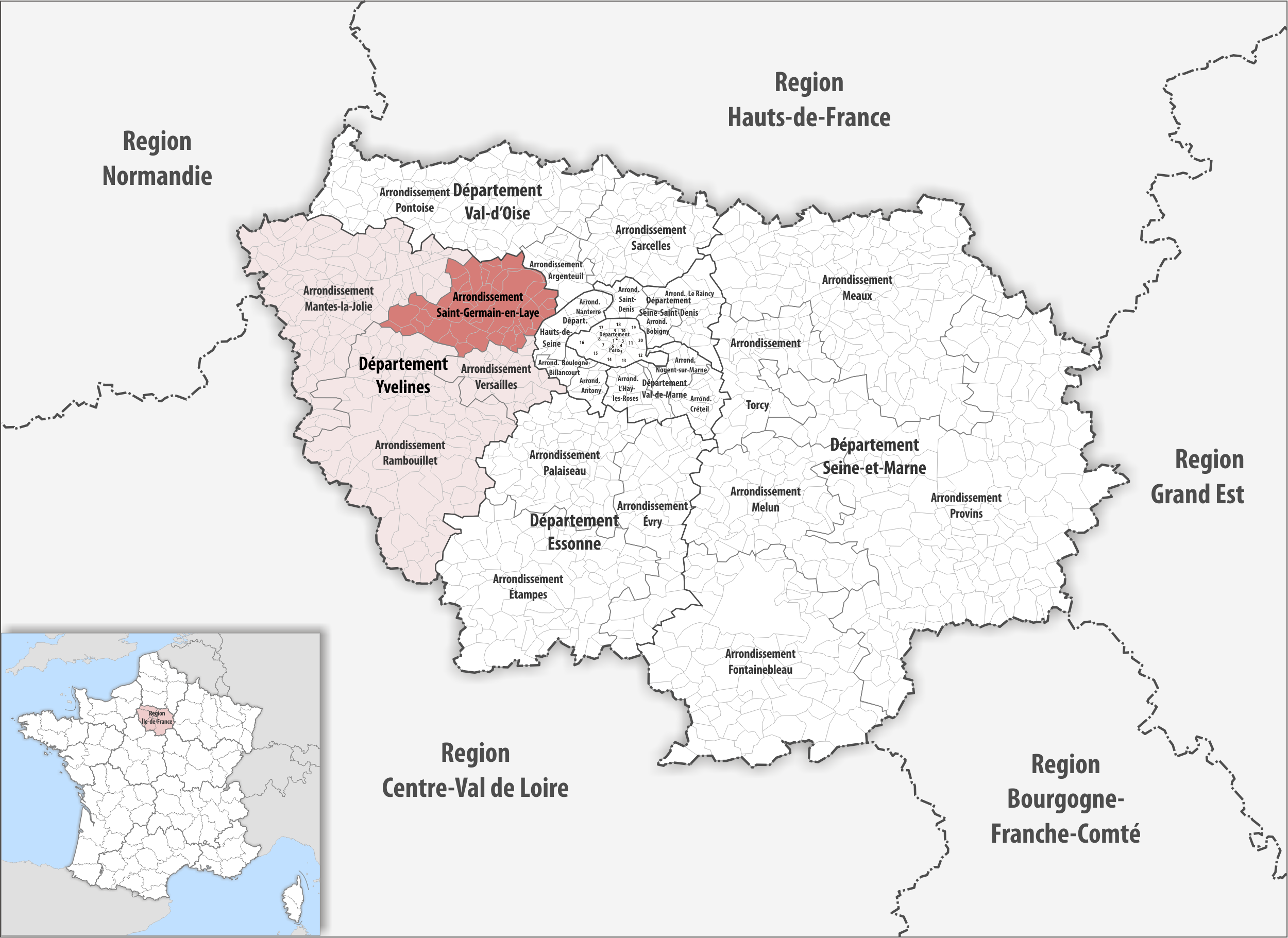
- Location within the region Île-de-France
- Country: France
- Region: Île-de-France
- Department: Yvelines
- No. of communes: {{{nbcomm}}}
- Area: 350.9 km^{2} (135.5 sq mi)
- Population (2023): 541,233
  - Density: 1,542/km^{2} (3,995/sq mi)
- INSEE code: 783

The arrondissement of Saint-Germain-en-Laye is an arrondissement of France in the Yvelines department in the Île-de-France region. It has 44 communes. Its population is 527,408 (2021), and its area is 350.9 km^{2} (135.5 sq mi).

== Composition ==
The communes of the arrondissement of Saint-Germain-en-Laye, and their INSEE codes, are:

1. Achères (78005)
2. Aigremont (78007)
3. Les Alluets-le-Roi (78010)
4. Andelu (78013)
5. Andrésy (78015)
6. Bazemont (78049)
7. Carrières-sous-Poissy (78123)
8. Carrières-sur-Seine (78124)
9. Chambourcy (78133)
10. Chanteloup-les-Vignes (78138)
11. Chatou (78146)
12. Chavenay (78152)
13. Conflans-Sainte-Honorine (78172)
14. Crespières (78189)
15. Croissy-sur-Seine (78190)
16. Davron (78196)
17. L'Étang-la-Ville (78224)
18. Feucherolles (78233)
19. Herbeville (78305)
20. Houilles (78311)
21. Louveciennes (78350)
22. Maisons-Laffitte (78358)
23. Mareil-Marly (78367)
24. Mareil-sur-Mauldre (78368)
25. Marly-le-Roi (78372)
26. Maule (78380)
27. Maurecourt (78382)
28. Médan (78384)
29. Le Mesnil-le-Roi (78396)
30. Montainville (78415)
31. Montesson (78418)
32. Morainvilliers (78431)
33. Orgeval (78466)
34. Le Pecq (78481)
35. Poissy (78498)
36. Le Port-Marly (78502)
37. Saint-Germain-en-Laye (78551)
38. Saint-Nom-la-Bretèche (78571)
39. Sartrouville (78586)
40. Triel-sur-Seine (78624)
41. Verneuil-sur-Seine (78642)
42. Vernouillet (78643)
43. Le Vésinet (78650)
44. Villennes-sur-Seine (78672)

== History ==
The arrondissement of Saint-Germain-en-Laye was created in 1962 as part of the department Seine-et-Oise. In 1968 it became part of the new department Yvelines. At the January 2017 reorganisation of the arrondissements of Seine-et-Marne, it received six communes from the arrondissement of Mantes-la-Jolie, and it lost six communes to the arrondissement of Versailles.

As a result of the reorganisation of the cantons of France which came into effect in 2015, the borders of the cantons are no longer related to the borders of the arrondissements. The cantons of the arrondissement of Saint-Germain-en-Laye were, as of January 2015:

1. Andrésy
2. La Celle-Saint-Cloud
3. Chatou
4. Conflans-Sainte-Honorine
5. Houilles
6. Maisons-Laffitte
7. Marly-le-Roi
8. Le Pecq
9. Poissy-Nord
10. Poissy-Sud
11. Saint-Germain-en-Laye-Nord
12. Saint-Germain-en-Laye-Sud
13. Saint-Nom-la-Bretèche
14. Sartrouville
15. Triel-sur-Seine
16. Le Vésinet
