= Rösrath =

- Town
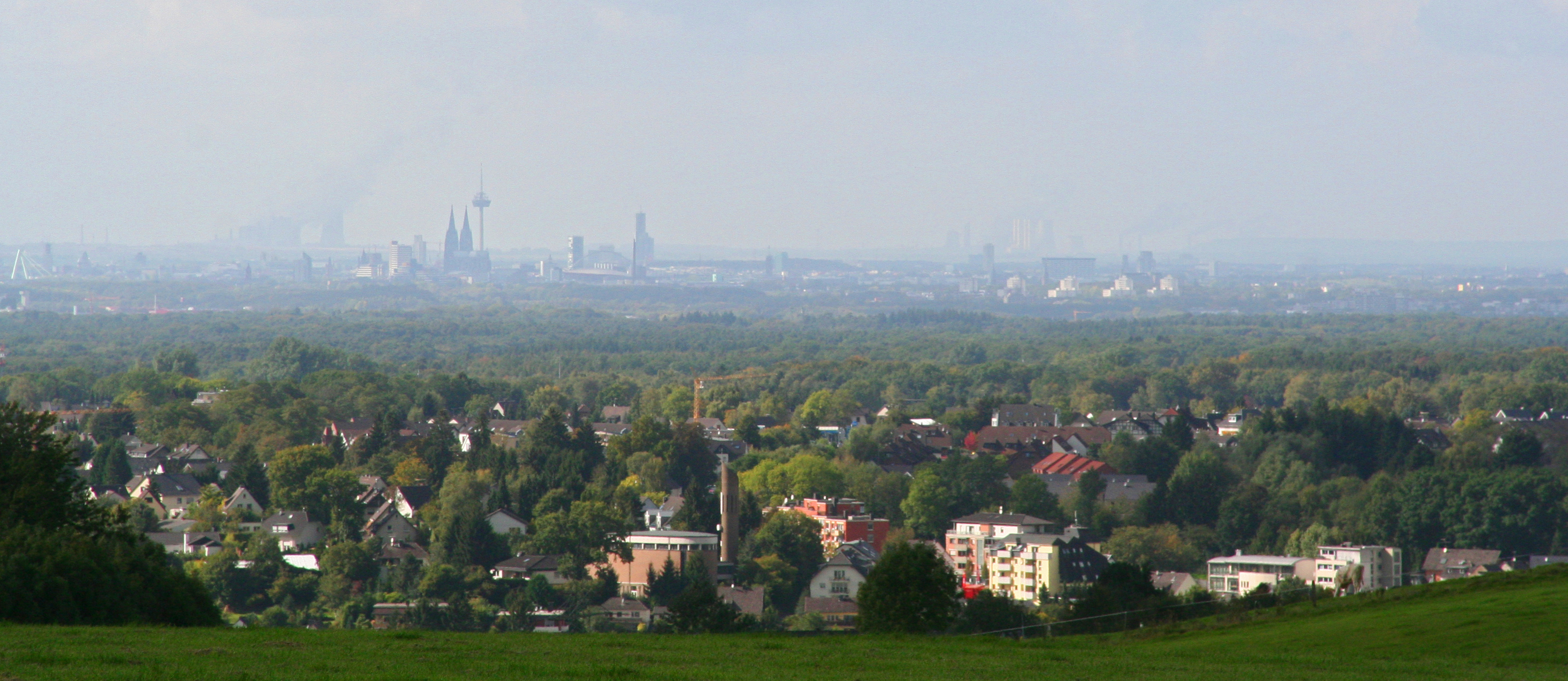

- Flag Coat of arms

- Location of Rösrath within Rheinisch-Bergischer Kreis district
- Interactive map of Rösrath
- Location within Germany Location within North Rhine-Westphalia
- Coordinates: 50°54′N 7°11′E
- Country: Germany
- State: North Rhine-Westphalia
- Admin. region: Cologne
- District: Rheinisch-Bergischer Kreis

Government
  - Mayor (2025–30): Yannick Steinbach (ForsPark)

Area
  - Total: 38.8 km^{2} (15.0 sq mi)
- Elevation: 71–260 m (233–853 ft)

Population (2025-12-31)
  - Total: 28,688
  - Density: 739/km^{2} (1,910/sq mi)
- Time zone: UTC+01:00 (CET)
  - Summer (DST): UTC+02:00 (CEST)
- Postal codes: 51503
- Dialling codes: 02205
- Vehicle registration: GL
- Website: www.roesrath.de

Rösrath (German pronunciation: [ˈʁøːsʁaːt]; Kölsch: Röhsroth [ˈʁœ́sʁɔt]) is a town in the Rheinisch-Bergischer Kreis (district) in North Rhine-Westphalia, Germany. The earliest known documents mentioning the settlement Rösrath can be found in documents dated to 1356. There have been findings of Paleolithic and Mesolithic tools in the town area Forsbach. The community was elevated to the town status in 2001.

== Geography ==
Rösrath is located in the immediate vicinity of Cologne. The municipal area of Rösrath is bordering on the south-eastern city limits of Cologne. Therefore, from Cologne's point of view Rösrath is called a Gateway to the Berg region (Bergisches Land). The municipal area partly extends over the nature reserves of the Wahner Heide and Königsforst.

== Population ==
Historical population

Year	Pop.	±% p.a.
1965	16,965	—
1970	19,281	+2.59%
1975	20,883	+1.61%
1980	21,338	+0.43%
1985	21,372	+0.03%
1990	22,849	+1.35%
1995	24,286	+1.23%

Year	Pop.	±% p.a.
2000	26,330	+1.63%
2005	27,121	+0.59%
2010	27,288	+0.12%
2015	28,386	+0.79%
2020	28,759	+0.26%
2025	28,688	−0.05%

Source: Landesdatabank Nordrhein-Westfalen

== Local government ==
Council, elections in May 2014:

- CDU 17 seats
- SPD 12 seats
- Alliance 90/The greens 6 seats
- FDP 4 seats
- Alternative für Deutschland / AfD 2 seats
- The Left 2 seats
- BfR (Bürger für Rösrath-Citizens for Rösrath) 1 seat
- Dieter von Niessen 1 seat
- Kacem Bitich (independent), 1 seat

=== Mayors ===
Mayors	Start of office	End of office	Party	comments
Franz Leyhausen	August 1878	June 1905		
Max Haumann	October 1905	March 1931		
Max Steinsträßer	April 1931	April 1945		
Gottfried Fuhrmann	May 1945	February 1946	CDU	
Robert Vierkötter	March 1946	October 1946	SPD	
Josef Arens	November 1946	March 1947	CDU	
Wilhelm Beinhoff	April 1947	October 1948	CDU	
Paul Leibner	November 1948	December 1950	SPD	
Günther Runkel	February 1951	November 1951	FDP	
Kurt Adenauer	December 1951	December 1954	CDU	
Erwin Schiffbauer	January 1955	April 1963	SPD	
Matthias Großmann	May 1963	October 1964	CDU	
Erwin Schiffbauer	November 1964	February 1972	SPD	
Siegfried Tews	March 1972	April 1975	SPD	
Karlheinz Krakau	May 1975	September 1989	CDU	
Dieter Happ	October 1989	November 2008	SPD	First full-time mayor since October 1, 1999
Marcus Mombauer	December 2008	September 2020	CDU	
Bondina Schulze	September 2020	October 2025	Grüne	
Yannick Steinbach	November 2025	in office	ForsPark	

=== Coat of Arms ===
The coat of arms of Rösrath consists of two areas:

- The upper area shows the red lion of Berg with blue crown, tongue and claws. The lion appears in most of the coats of arms in the district of the Rheinisch-Bergischer Kreis.
- The lower area shows a hunting horn with a green background. It symbolizes the Königsforst, in former times a popular hunting district of the earls of Berg.

== Culture ==
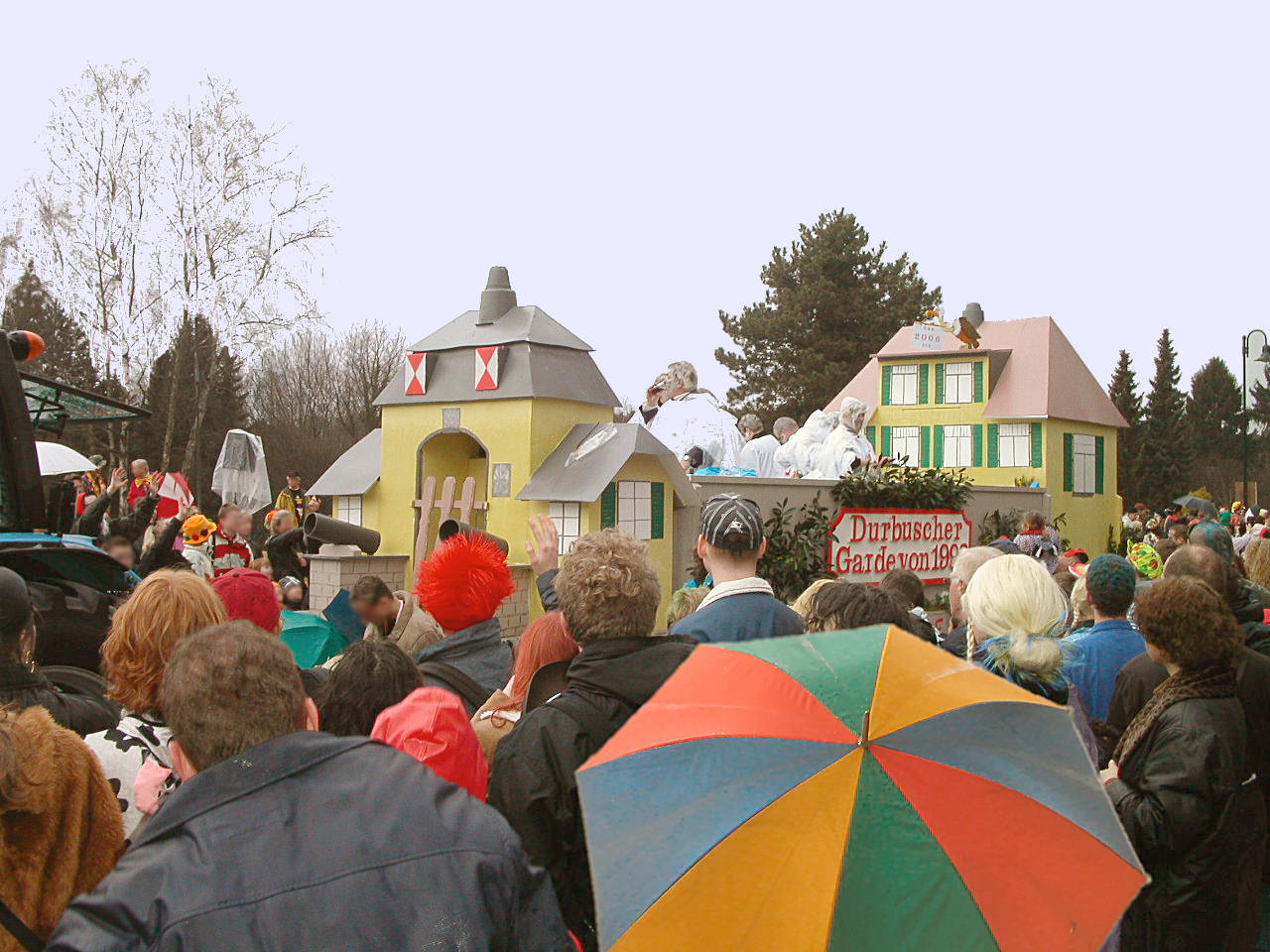
Eulenbroich Castle in the carnival parade

Rösrath is known for the Rose Monday Parade, organized every year.

== Landmarks ==
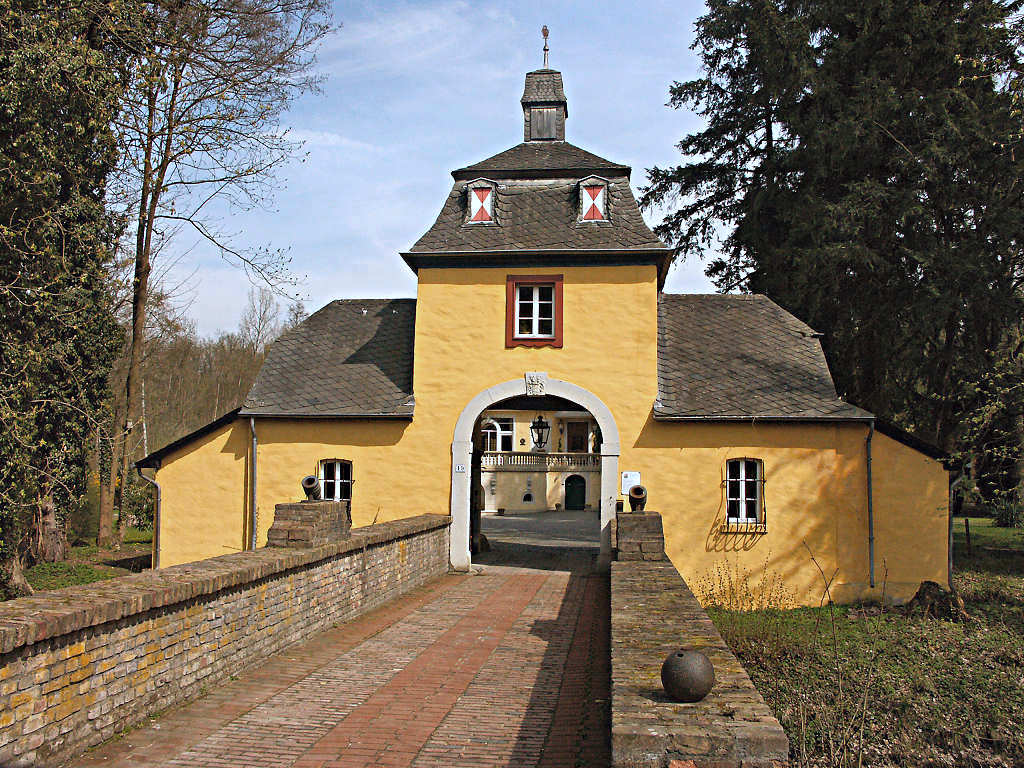
Gateway of Eulenbroich Castle

The gateway of Eulenbroich Castle is virtually the landmark of Rösrath. This "gateway to the Berg region" (Bergisches Land) is used as logo on the letterheads and internet pages of the town council.

== Twin towns – sister cities ==
Rösrath is twinned with:

- Veurne, Belgium (1974)
- Chavenay, France (1998)
- Crespières, France (1998)
- Feucherolles, France (1998)
- Saint-Nom-la-Bretèche, France (1998)

== Notable people ==
- Chris Howland (1928–2013), entertainer, actor and author, lived in Rosrath
- Wolfgang Bochow (1944–2017), badminton player
- Rainer Brüninghaus (born 1949), jazz pianist and composer, has been living in Rösrath since 1976
- Anke Engelke (born 1965), actor and comedian, graduated from the Freiherr-vom-Stein-Schule in Rösrath in 1984
