= Davron =

- Commune
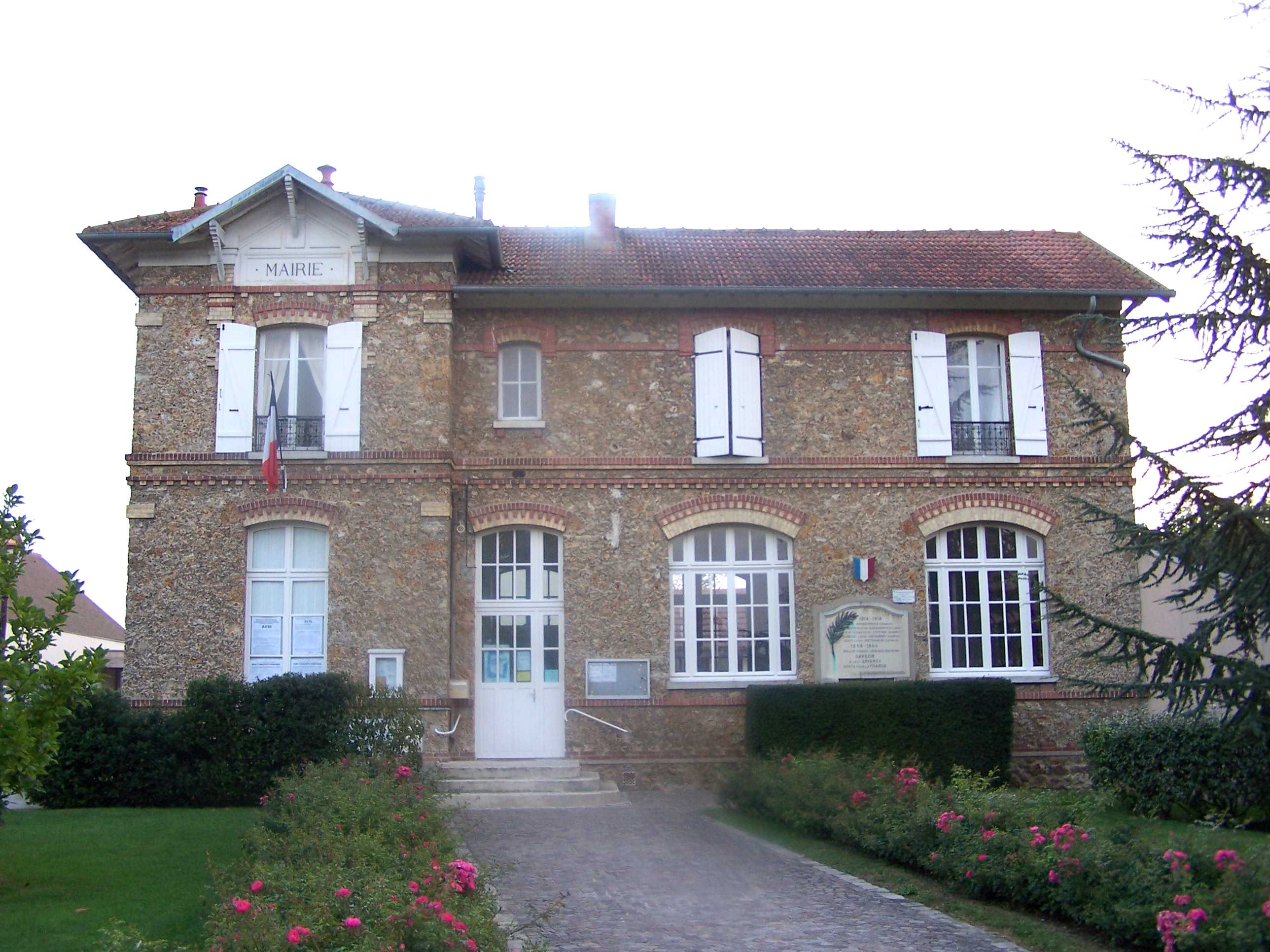
- Town hall

- Coat of arms
- Location of Davron
- Location within France Location within Île-de-France (region)
- Coordinates: 48°51′59″N 1°56′51″E
- Country: France
- Region: Île-de-France
- Department: Yvelines
- Arrondissement: Saint-Germain-en-Laye
- Canton: Verneuil-sur-Seine

Government
  - Mayor (2020–2026): Damien Guibout
- Area^{1}: 5.95 km^{2} (2.30 sq mi)
- Elevation: 120 m (390 ft)
- Highest elevation: 142 m (466 ft)
- Lowest elevation: 72 m (236 ft)
- Population (2023): 295
  - Density: 49.6/km^{2} (128/sq mi)
- Time zone: UTC+01:00 (CET)
  - Summer (DST): UTC+02:00 (CEST)
- INSEE/Postal code: 78196 /78810
- Website: www.davron.fr
- ^{1} French Land Register data, which excludes lakes, ponds, glaciers > 1 km^{2} (0.386 sq mi or 247 acres) and river estuaries.

Davron (French pronunciation: [davʁɔ̃]) is a commune in the Yvelines department in the Île-de-France in north-central France.

== Gallery ==
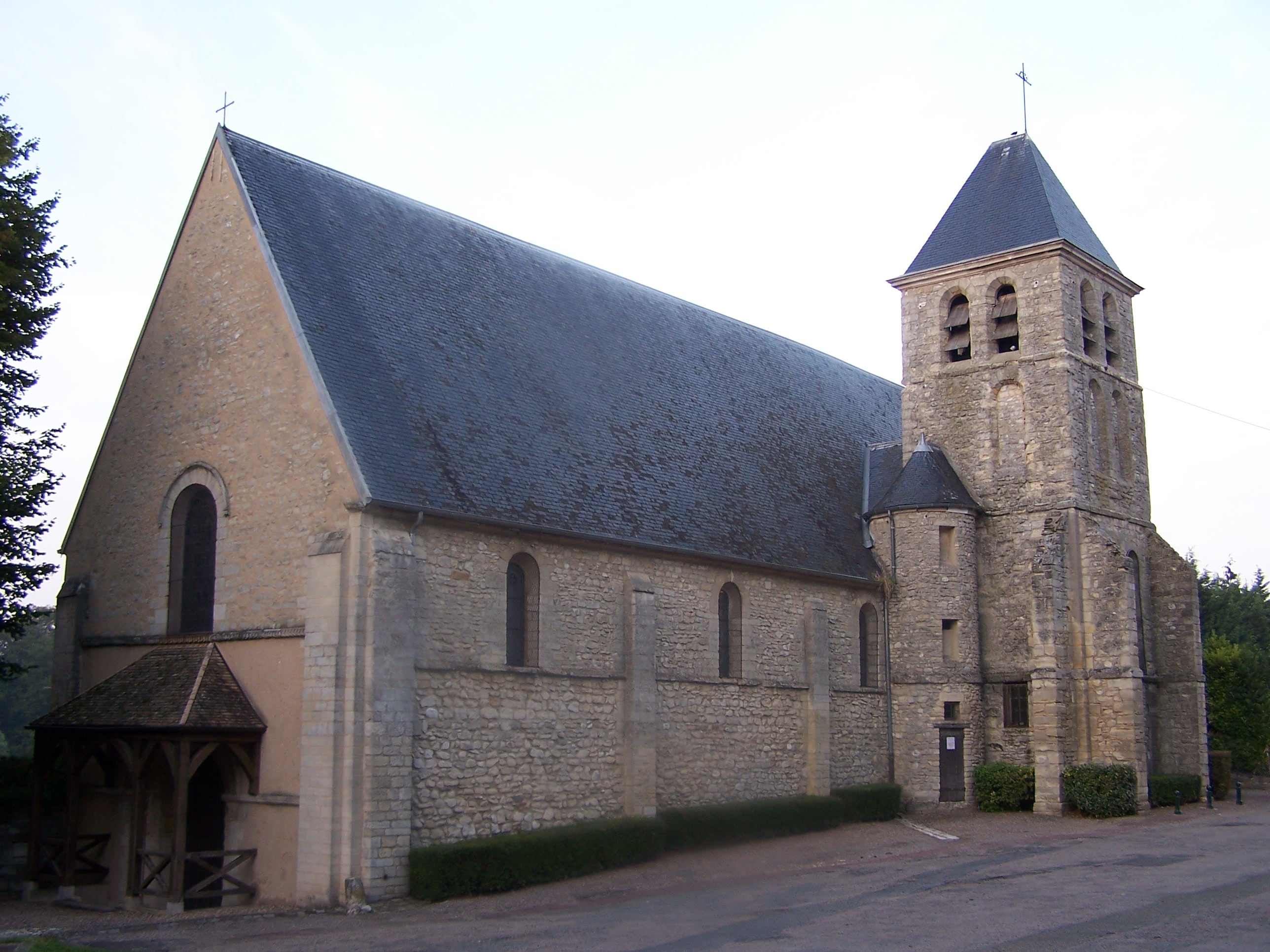
Sainte-Madeleine

== See also ==
- Communes of the Yvelines department
