= Chanteloup-les-Vignes =

- Commune
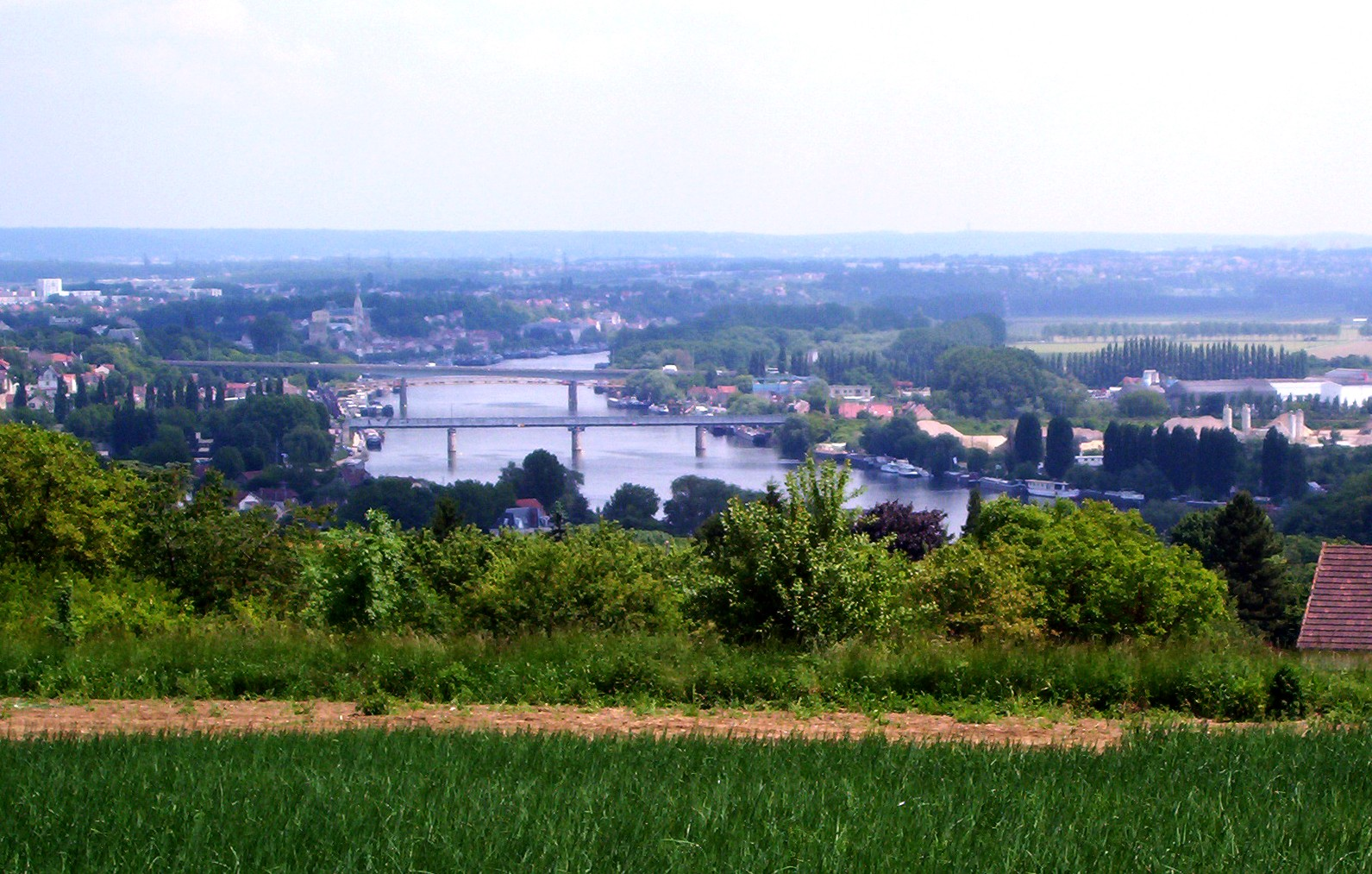
- A view of Chanteloup-les-Vignes and the River Seine

- Coat of arms
- Location of Chanteloup-les-Vignes
- Location within France Location within Île-de-France (region)
- Coordinates: 48°58′45″N 2°01′55″E
- Country: France
- Region: Île-de-France
- Department: Yvelines
- Arrondissement: Saint-Germain-en-Laye
- Canton: Conflans-Sainte-Honorine
- Intercommunality: CU Grand Paris Seine et Oise

Government
  - Mayor (2020–2026): Catherine Arenou
- Area^{1}: 3.33 km^{2} (1.29 sq mi)
- Elevation: 20 m (66 ft)
- Highest elevation: 171 m (561 ft)
- Lowest elevation: 38 m (125 ft)
- Population (2023): 10,861
  - Density: 3,260/km^{2} (8,450/sq mi)
- Time zone: UTC+01:00 (CET)
  - Summer (DST): UTC+02:00 (CEST)
- INSEE/Postal code: 78138 /78570
- ^{1} French Land Register data, which excludes lakes, ponds, glaciers > 1 km^{2} (0.386 sq mi or 247 acres) and river estuaries.

Chanteloup-les-Vignes (French pronunciation: [ʃɑ̃tlu le viɲ]) is a commune and town in the Yvelines department, Île-de-France, north central France.

The town was used for a large part of the film La Haine.

== Demographic evolution ==
Historical population

Year	Pop.	±% p.a.
1793	1,083	—
1800	883	−2.87%
1806	900	+0.32%
1821	841	−0.45%
1831	799	−0.51%
1836	790	−0.23%
1841	753	−0.95%
1846	771	+0.47%
1851	781	+0.26%
1856	715	−1.75%
1861	738	+0.64%
1866	738	+0.00%
1872	696	−0.97%
1876	675	−0.76%
1881	685	+0.29%
1886	697	+0.35%
1891	717	+0.57%
1896	760	+1.17%
1901	772	+0.31%

Year	Pop.	±% p.a.
1906	807	+0.89%
1911	856	+1.19%
1921	824	−0.38%
1926	954	+2.97%
1931	1,031	+1.56%
1936	1,014	−0.33%
1946	1,042	+0.27%
1954	1,384	+3.61%
1962	1,777	+3.17%
1968	2,075	+2.62%
1975	4,616	+12.10%
1982	10,297	+12.14%
1990	10,175	−0.15%
1999	9,544	−0.71%
2007	9,081	−0.62%
2012	9,906	+1.75%
2017	10,374	+0.93%
2023	10,861	+0.77%

Source: EHESS and INSEE (1968-2023)

== See also ==
- Communes of the Yvelines department
