= Villennes-sur-Seine =

- Commune
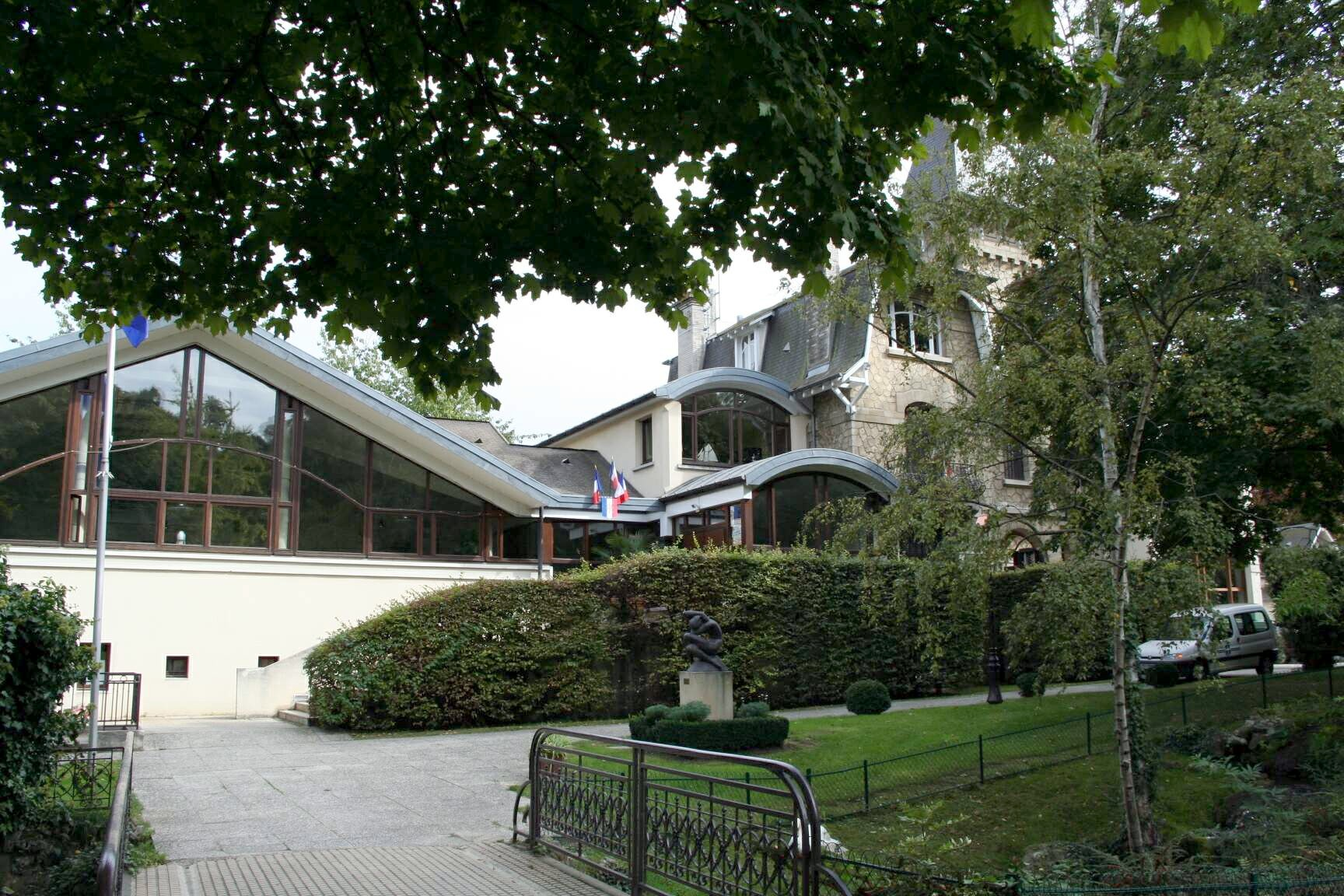
- Town hall

- Coat of arms
- Location of Villennes-sur-Seine
- Location within France Location within Île-de-France (region)
- Coordinates: 48°56′23″N 1°59′55″E
- Country: France
- Region: Île-de-France
- Department: Yvelines
- Arrondissement: Saint-Germain-en-Laye
- Canton: Verneuil-sur-Seine
- Intercommunality: CU Grand Paris Seine et Oise

Government
  - Mayor (2020–2026): Jean-Pierre Laigneau
- Area^{1}: 5.17 km^{2} (2.00 sq mi)
- Elevation: 19 m (62 ft)
- Highest elevation: 132 m (433 ft)
- Lowest elevation: 19 m (62 ft)
- Population (2023): 5,952
  - Density: 1,150/km^{2} (2,980/sq mi)
- Time zone: UTC+01:00 (CET)
  - Summer (DST): UTC+02:00 (CEST)
- INSEE/Postal code: 78672 /78670
- ^{1} French Land Register data, which excludes lakes, ponds, glaciers > 1 km^{2} (0.386 sq mi or 247 acres) and river estuaries.

Villennes-sur-Seine (French pronunciation: [vilɛn syʁ sɛn], literally Villennes on Seine) is a commune in the Yvelines department in the Île-de-France in north-central France.

Villennes-sur-Seine is located in the Seine Valley 30 km (19 mi) west of Paris. Located in the village itself are an eleventh-century church and ancient grottos.

== History ==
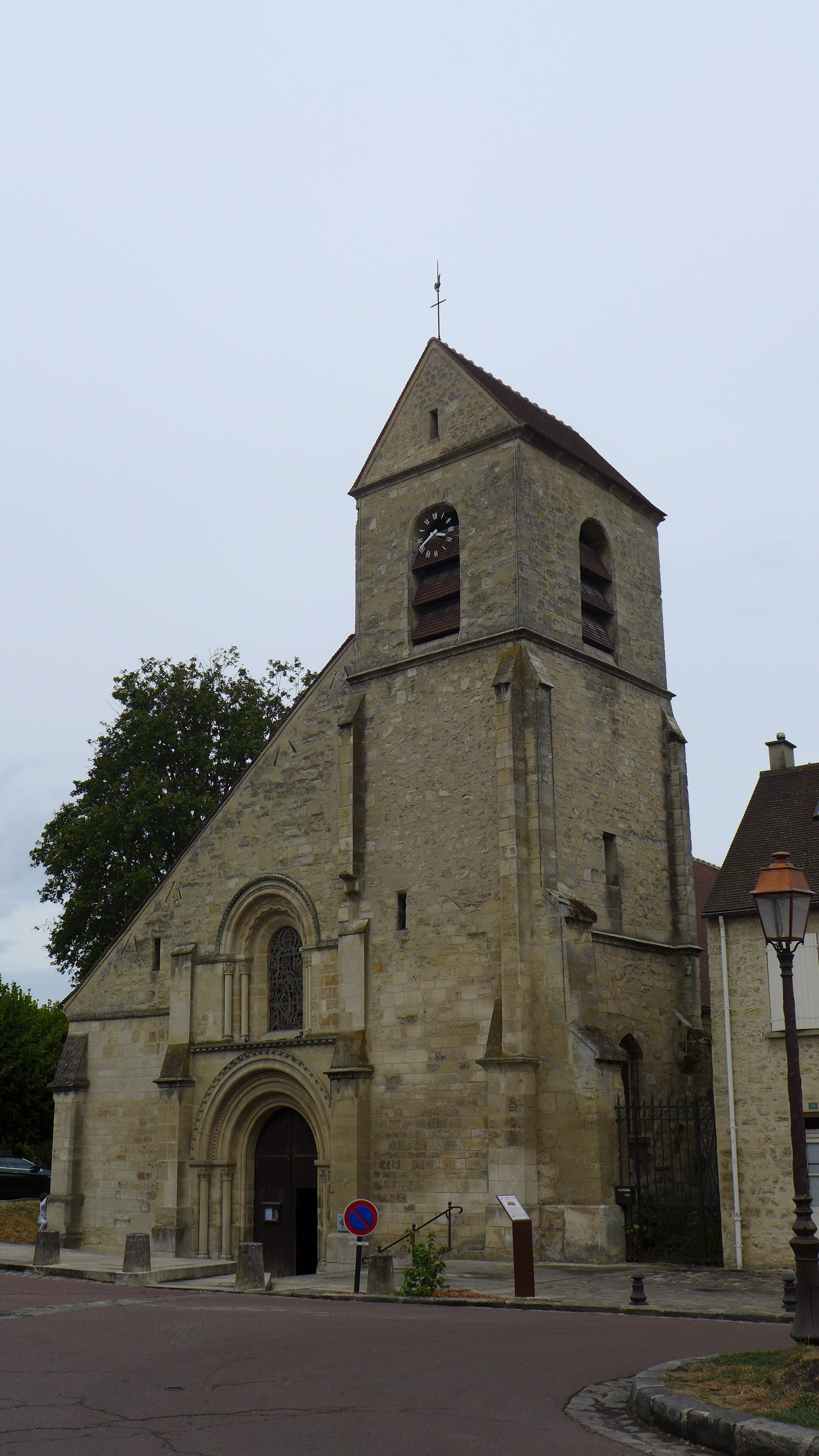
Saint Nicholas Church

=== Saint-Nicholas Church ===
The construction of Saint-Nicholas church started in the eleventh century and ended in the twelfth under the initiative of the abbey of Saint Germain-des-Prés. The church served as a parish for the neighboring towns of Médan and Flacourt.

In the hundred years' war the church was partially destroyed leaving the apse and the transept in ruins.

In the eighteenth century, the church was associated with the Coulombs en Eure et Loir abbey and major renovations began. A complete restoration was initiated in 1717.

In 1926, Saint-Nicholas church was declared a national monument.

Between 1978 and 1994, the church was restored again with financing from the state, the department, the region, the commune as well as the association of the restoration and safeguard of church.

=== World War I ===
==== Armed forces in Villennes-sur-Seine ====
- The Railroad Guards

Commonly referred to as the G.V.C. (Gardes des Voies de Communication), soldiers were stationed in Villennes-sur-Seine to protect the railroad. The military garrison was composed of 25 men who needed lodging and food. The restaurant owners of the town were requisitioned to feed the soldiers three meals a day, each consisting of 400g of bread, 100g of meat served with vegetables and wine for two francs per day per soldier.

Seeing that the restaurant owners at the time couldn't afford to feed the whole garrison, the mayor at the time, Alfred Laumonier wrote to the state asking the restaurant owners be paid back in full.

In November 2014, apartments in Villennes-sur-Seine were allotted to the G.V.C. with heating and living costs paid by the town. Eventually, the commune was unable to pay and had to ask residents to provide wood to heat the apartments.

- The Infantry Regime

The presence of the first and second companies of the 286th infantry regime in Villennes-sur-Seine disturbed daily life starting in July 1915. The general of the infantry was housed in the Château d'Aqueville while the soldiers stayed with townsfolk on straw or in empty houses.

According to a law written in 1877, homeowners hosting soldiers were obligated to provide 850g of wood to each soldier. This law would be the cause of overworking for many villagers. Other issues followed including the sudden overflow of telegrams, resulting in tension between the townspeople and the infantry.

In summer, many villagers had their boats as well as horses and carriages requisitioned for military transport.

After the company's departure in May 1916, the villagers that hosted soldiers received indemnities, some even requested additional money to cover damages caused by the soldiers.

==== War Requisitions ====
Since the beginning of the war, Villennes-sur-Seine was forced to contribute to the nourishment of the army—both men and horses. The mayor attempted to oppose requisitions as the crops from the only farm in Villennes-sur-Seine were hardly enough for to sustain the needs of the town. Requisitions by the army for wheat, hay, and potatoes only increased.

As the war continued, crops were difficult to harvest as the population of young men at war would have normally contributed to agricultural labor. Mr. Laumonier requested a delay in the recruitment of farmers from Villennes-sur-Seine. He also requested soldiers for harvest season and to pick potatoes and beetroots at smaller farms. For the harvest of 1915, at least twenty soldiers were called.

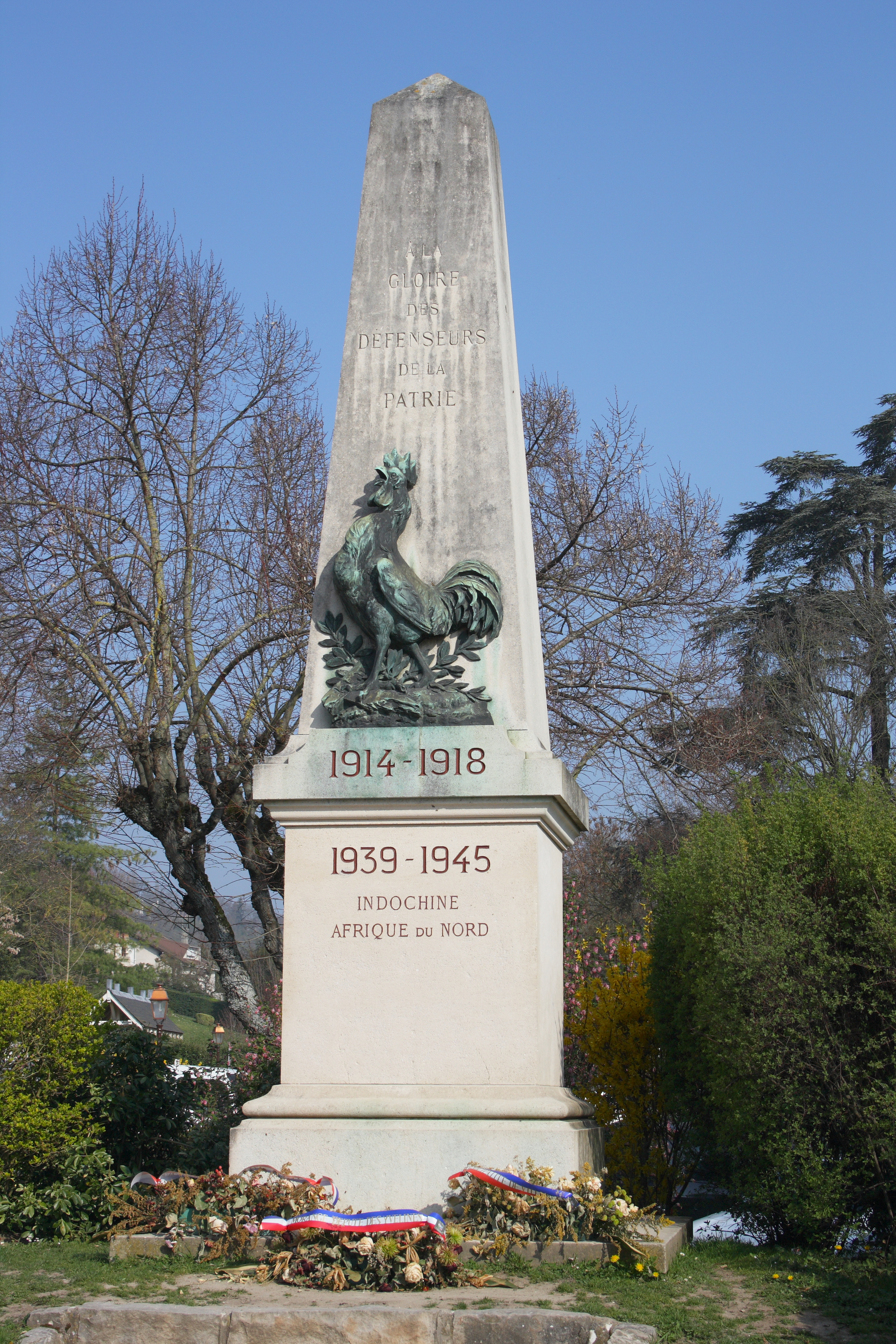
Monument in honor of the men who lost their lives in World War I

As the war continued, Villennes-sur-Seine suffered a wheat shortage. Wheat being the most important crop in the commune, the requisitions demanded by the state could not be met by the farmers in the town. Once all the wheat was requisitioned from the Maroles farm, Mr. Laumonier had crops brought in from Saint Germain-en-Laye to feed the villagers.

==== Foreigners in Villennes-sur-Seine ====
Throughout the war, Villennes-sur-Seine saw few foreigners, with a maximum of 22 at one time. Most were from Allied countries such as England, the United States, Belgium or Italy, but the town shows records of hosting people from Argentina, Brazil and Spain.

On several accounts, the mayor gave the authorities reports on people from Germany or Austria that had lived in Villennes-sur-Seine. In some cases, if said person is deemed a traitor, their homes were to be boarded up by the commune.

==== Victims of the War ====
Starting in November 1914, Villennes-sur-Seine began to see their villagers die. The first deaths were two brothers from one of the town's smaller farms.

In total, 42 young men from Villennes-sur-Seine died for their country. Amongst them were men from both wealthy and modest backgrounds.

A monument was created in 1919 in their honor.

=== Interwar period ===
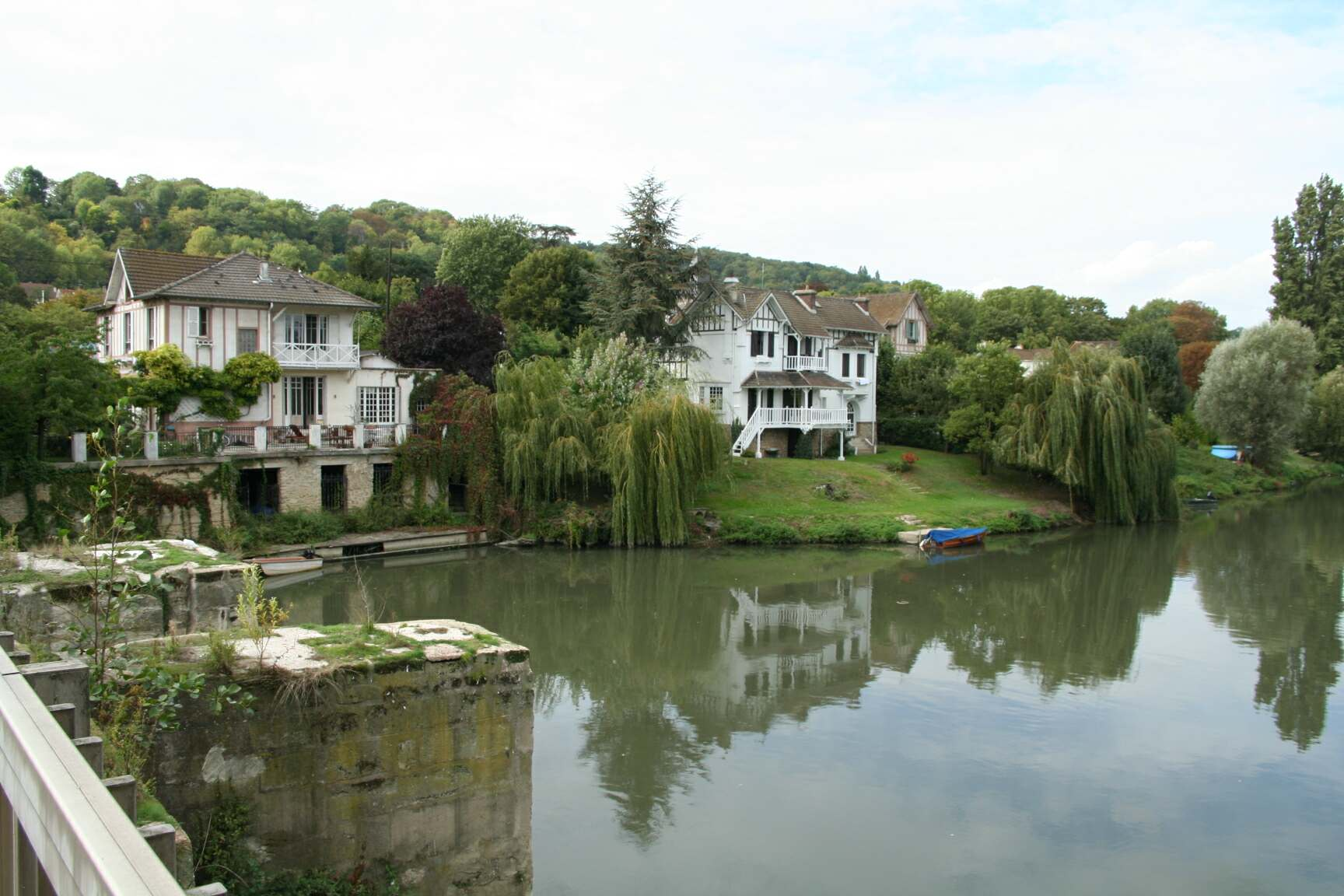
Houses built on the Île-de-Villennes in the early twentieth century

After the end of the war, the Parisians returned to Villennes-sur-Seine and in the span of one summer, the population doubled. Many villas were constructed across the town; first around the Falaises woods and then on the Island of Villennes. In 1919, Villennes-sur-Seine was considered a tourist station as the whole town was transformed to look more like a resort.

Boating, fishing and swimming in the Seine gain popularity and many parties on the riverside took place. In 1927, l'Île du Platais (otherwise uninhabited) welcomed a new population of vacationers in bungalows or tents in the Physiopolis center. Physiopolis brought in consistent amounts of people all throughout the summer and made Villennes-sur-Seine a weekend getaway destination for the Parisian upperclass.

=== World War II ===
On a night in July 1944, a Germain plane crashed into a house on the Marolles farm, killing a couple in their sleep. The debris spread on a radius of 30 meters and to this day, a pit can be pointed out on the Marolles farm that corresponds to the location of the crash.

The morning of the arrival of the American liberation forces in Villennes-sur-Seine, 25 August 1944, German forces present in the town were in search of suspects. Having been attacked the night prior, the soldiers arrested four men and brought them into the basement of a home: Michel and Jacques Jeunet, Alfred Boursinhac and Rodolphe Gerha. The soldiers threw grenades at them, killing Rodolphe Gerha and Michel Jeunet instantly. The two others survived but were badly wounded.

== Population ==
Historical population
Year	Pop.	±% p.a.
1968	2,311	—
1975	3,323	+5.33%
1982	3,886	+2.26%
1990	4,504	+1.86%
1999	4,790	+0.69%
2007	5,045	+0.65%
2012	5,115	+0.28%
2017	5,282	+0.64%
2023	5,952	+2.01%
Source: INSEE

== Activities in Villennes-sur-Seine ==
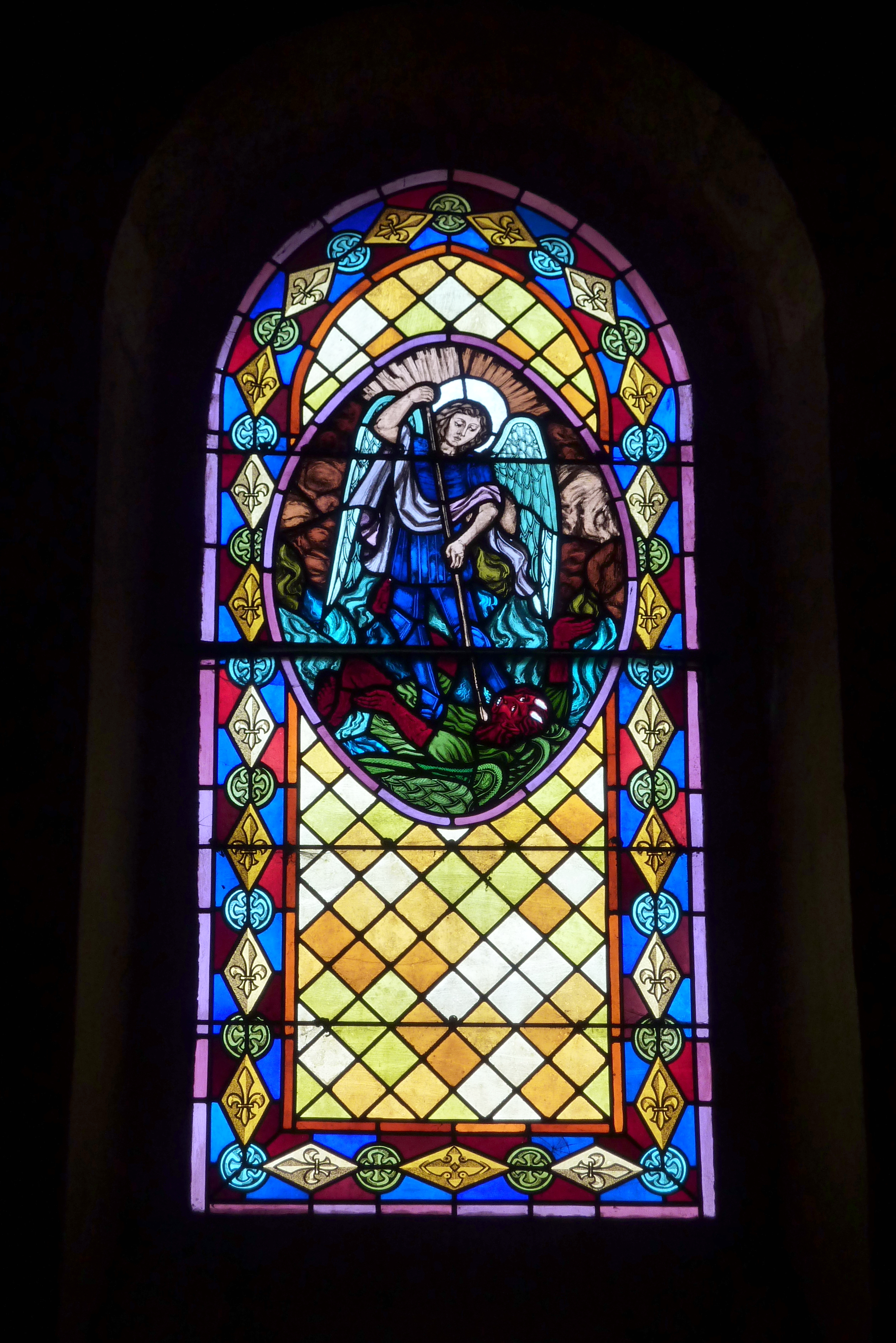
Stained glass windows inside the Saint-Nicholas church

=== Saint-Nicholas Church ===
The Saint-Nicholas church is one of the oldest in the Yvelines. It is in the traditional Roman style of the eleventh century and is composed of a nave, two aisles and a bell tower. On the inside of the church, decorative columns can be found as well as stained glass windows.

=== Possible strolls around the town ===
- Stroll along the Seine

A path along the Seine from the southernmost point of the town to the northernmost goes along the waterway with views of the water and the old homes of Villennes-sur-Seine.

- L'Île de Villennes

The island, accessible by walking, is home to many old villas along the Seine.

== See also ==
- Communes of the Yvelines department
