= Canton of Verneuil-sur-Seine =

Coordinates: 48.98°N 1.97°E

The canton of Verneuil-sur-Seine is an administrative division of the Yvelines department, northern France. It was created at the French canton reorganisation which came into effect in March 2015. Its seat is in Verneuil-sur-Seine.

It consists of the following communes:

1. Les Alluets-le-Roi
2. Crespières
3. Davron
4. Feucherolles
5. Médan
6. Morainvilliers
7. Noisy-le-Roi
8. Orgeval
9. Saint-Nom-la-Bretèche
10. Triel-sur-Seine
11. Verneuil-sur-Seine
12. Vernouillet
13. Villennes-sur-Seine
