= Maurecourt =

- Commune
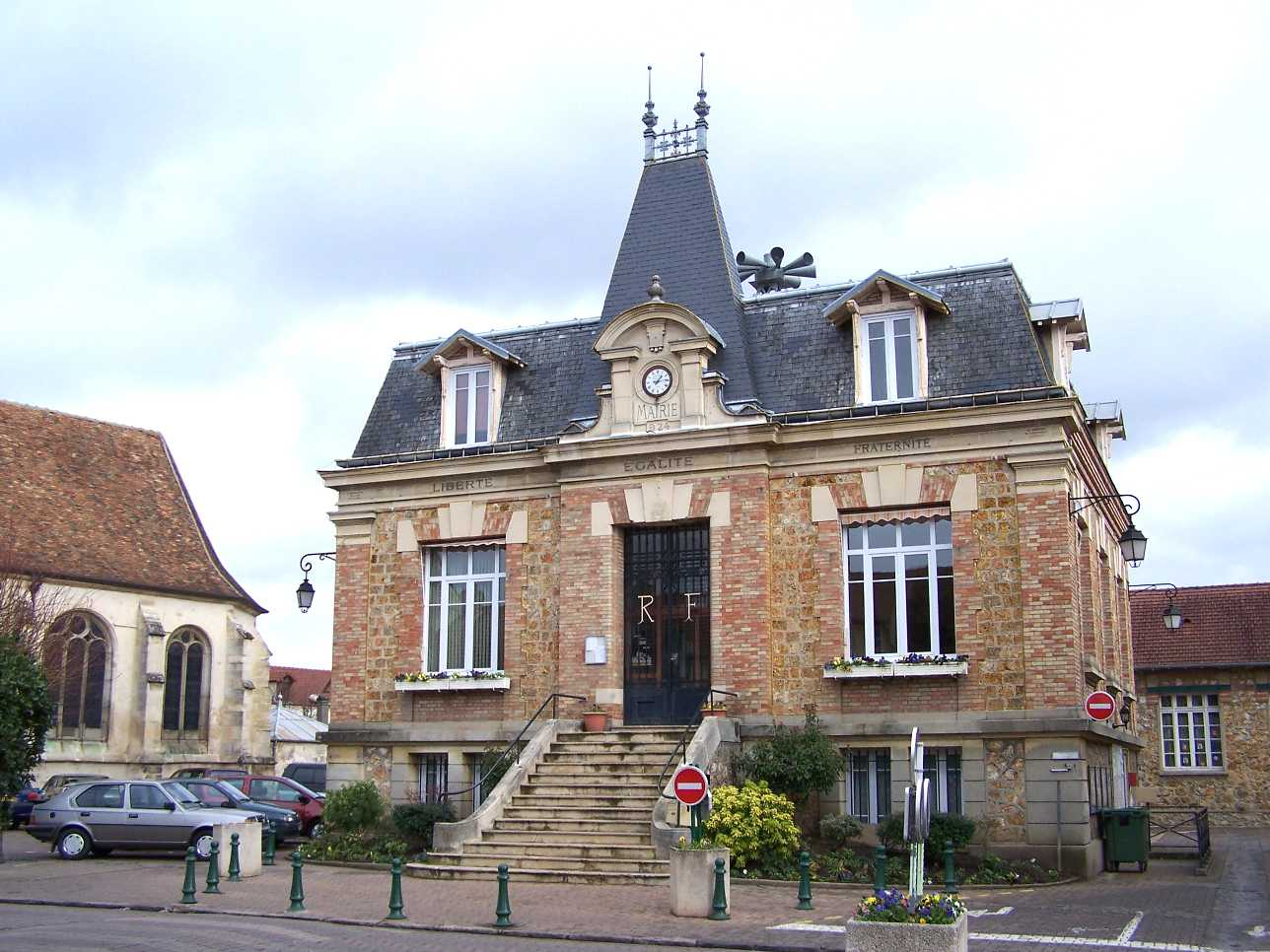
- Town hall

- Coat of arms
- Location of Maurecourt
- Location within France Location within Île-de-France (region)
- Coordinates: 48°59′53″N 2°03′46″E
- Country: France
- Region: Île-de-France
- Department: Yvelines
- Arrondissement: Saint-Germain-en-Laye
- Canton: Conflans-Sainte-Honorine
- Intercommunality: Cergy-Pontoise

Government
  - Mayor (2022–2026): Didier Guerrey
- Area^{1}: 3.65 km^{2} (1.41 sq mi)
- Elevation: 40 m (130 ft)
- Highest elevation: 167 m (548 ft)
- Lowest elevation: 19 m (62 ft)
- Population (2023): 4,454
  - Density: 1,220/km^{2} (3,160/sq mi)
- Time zone: UTC+01:00 (CET)
  - Summer (DST): UTC+02:00 (CEST)
- INSEE/Postal code: 78382 /78780
- ^{1} French Land Register data, which excludes lakes, ponds, glaciers > 1 km^{2} (0.386 sq mi or 247 acres) and river estuaries.

Maurecourt (French pronunciation: [moʁkuʁ]) is a commune in the Yvelines department in the Île-de-France region in north-central France.

Emblem

== Population ==
Historical population
Year	Pop.	±% p.a.
1968	2,380	—
1975	2,870	+2.71%
1982	2,730	−0.71%
1990	3,359	+2.63%
1999	3,493	+0.44%
2007	4,134	+2.13%
2012	4,369	+1.11%
2017	4,358	−0.05%
2023	4,454	+0.36%
Source: INSEE

== Education ==
Schools include:

- École maternelle Chantebelle
- École élémentaire La Cerisaie
- École élémentaire Les Tilleuls

== See also ==
- Communes of the Yvelines department
