= Feucherolles =

- Commune
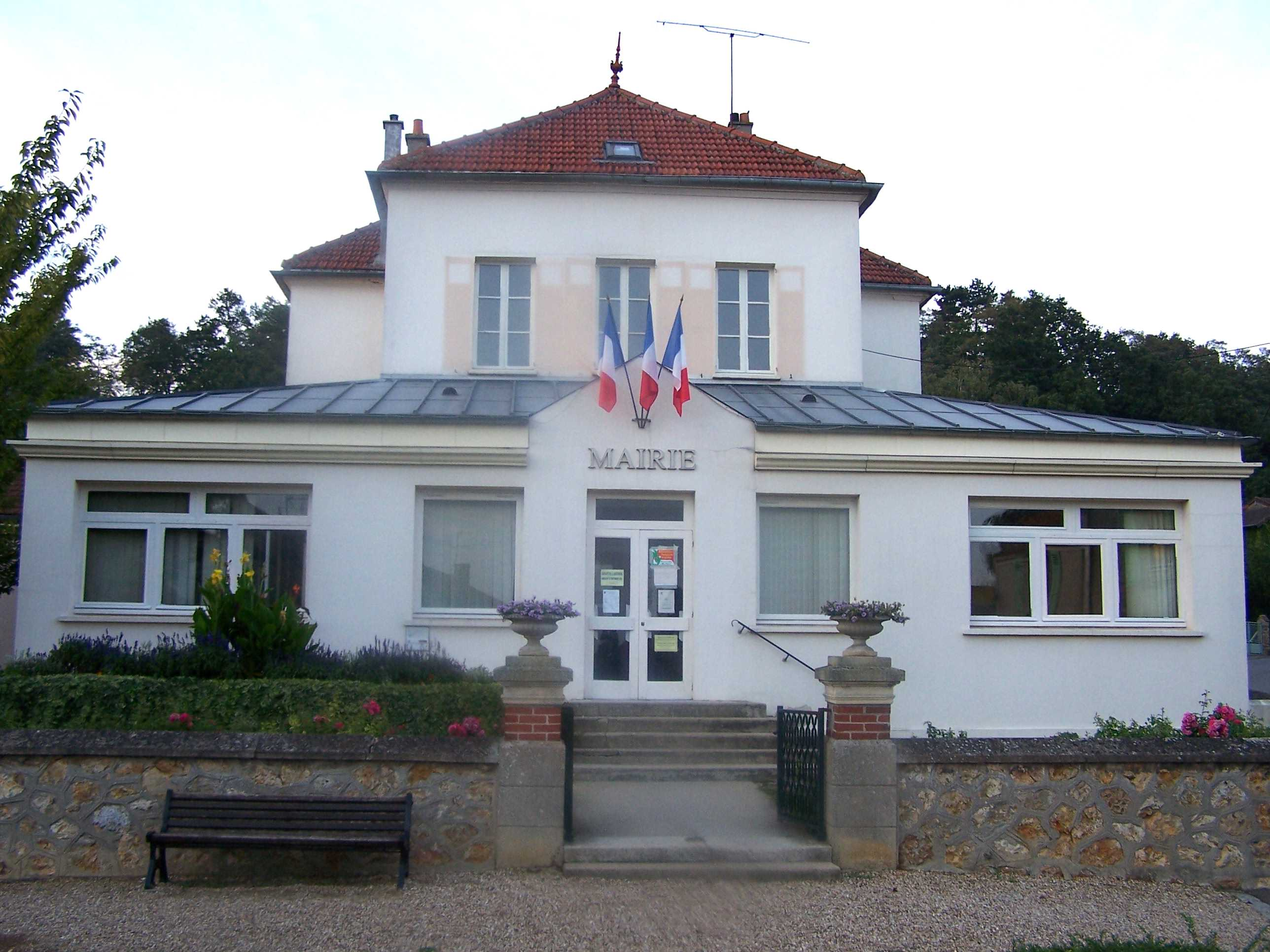
- Town hall

- Coat of arms
- Location of Feucherolles
- Location within France Location within Île-de-France (region)
- Coordinates: 48°52′25″N 1°58′26″E
- Country: France
- Region: Île-de-France
- Department: Yvelines
- Arrondissement: Saint-Germain-en-Laye
- Canton: Verneuil-sur-Seine

Government
  - Mayor (2020–2026): Patrick Loisel
- Area^{1}: 12.85 km^{2} (4.96 sq mi)
- Elevation: 150 m (490 ft)
- Highest elevation: 185 m (607 ft)
- Lowest elevation: 85 m (279 ft)
- Population (2023): 3,043
  - Density: 236.8/km^{2} (613.3/sq mi)
- Time zone: UTC+01:00 (CET)
  - Summer (DST): UTC+02:00 (CEST)
- INSEE/Postal code: 78233 /78810
- ^{1} French Land Register data, which excludes lakes, ponds, glaciers > 1 km^{2} (0.386 sq mi or 247 acres) and river estuaries.

Feucherolles (French pronunciation: [føʃʁɔl]) is a commune in the Yvelines department in the Île-de-France in north-central France.

== Population ==
Historical population
Year	Pop.	±% p.a.
1968	1,047	—
1975	2,052	+10.09%
1982	2,178	+0.85%
1990	2,699	+2.72%
1999	2,806	+0.43%
2007	3,015	+0.90%
2012	2,826	−1.29%
2017	2,874	+0.34%
2023	3,043	+0.96%
Source: INSEE

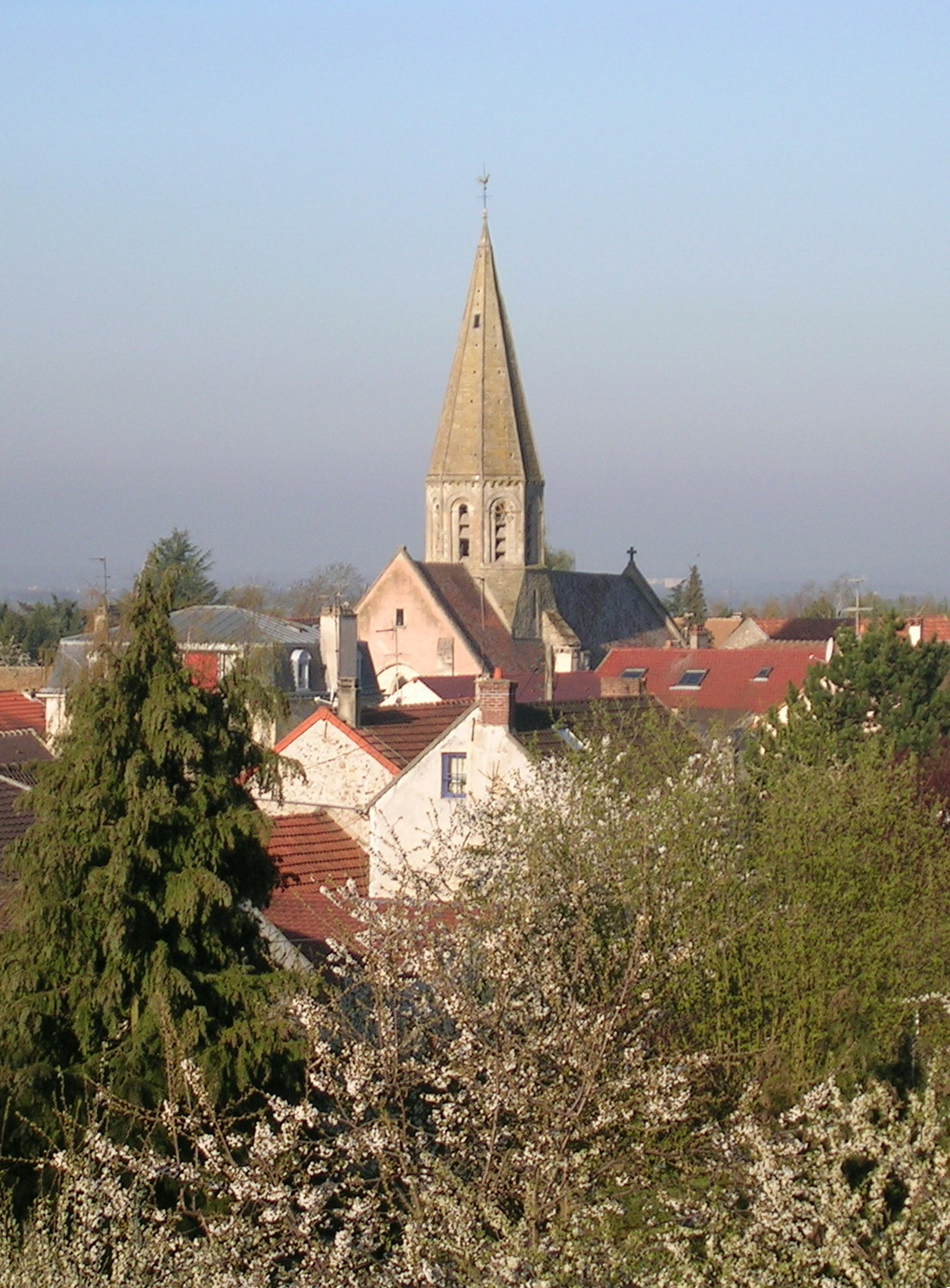
Feucherolles

== Twin towns ==
Along with Crespières, Chavenay and Saint-Nom-la-Bretèche Feucherolles is twinned with Rösrath, Germany.

== See also ==
- Communes of the Yvelines department
