= Morainvilliers =

- Commune
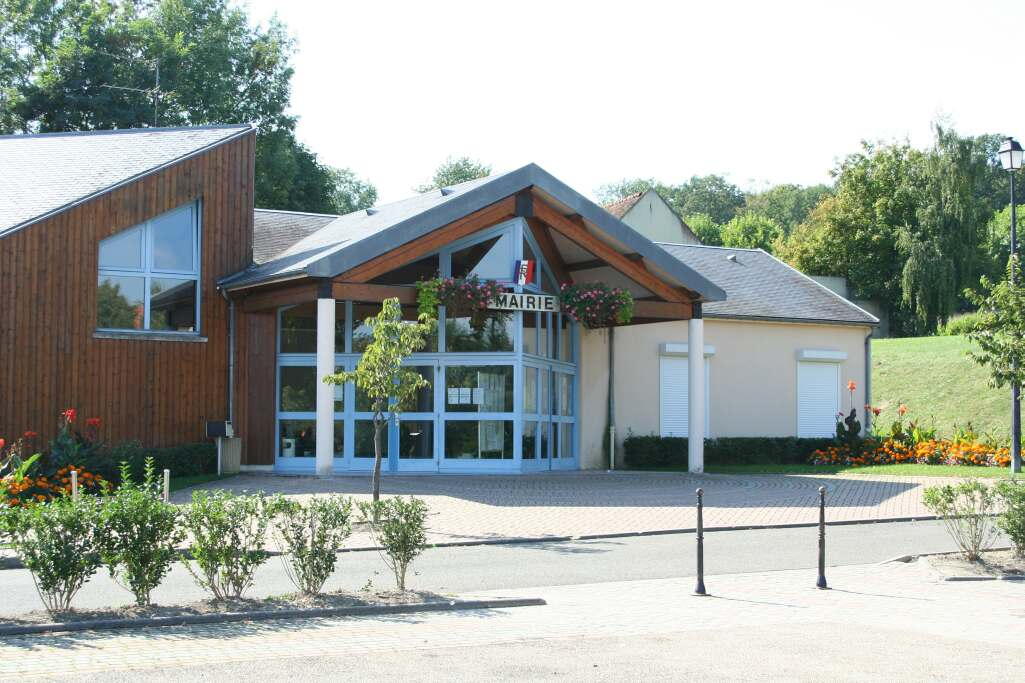
- Town hall

- Coat of arms
- Location of Morainvilliers
- Location within France Location within Île-de-France (region)
- Coordinates: 48°55′46″N 1°56′16″E
- Country: France
- Region: Île-de-France
- Department: Yvelines
- Arrondissement: Saint-Germain-en-Laye
- Canton: Verneuil-sur-Seine
- Intercommunality: CU Grand Paris Seine et Oise

Government
  - Mayor (2020–2026): Fabienne Deveze
- Area^{1}: 7.24 km^{2} (2.80 sq mi)
- Elevation: 110 m (360 ft)
- Highest elevation: 181 m (594 ft)
- Lowest elevation: 58 m (190 ft)
- Population (2023): 3,120
  - Density: 431/km^{2} (1,120/sq mi)
- Time zone: UTC+01:00 (CET)
  - Summer (DST): UTC+02:00 (CEST)
- INSEE/Postal code: 78431 /78630
- ^{1} French Land Register data, which excludes lakes, ponds, glaciers > 1 km^{2} (0.386 sq mi or 247 acres) and river estuaries.

Morainvilliers (French pronunciation: [mɔʁɛ̃vilje]) is a commune in the Yvelines department in the Île-de-France region in north-central France.

Morainvilliers is one of the French cities with the highest per capita tax income and is characterised by particularly high property prices. Its pleasant living environment and its proximity to Paris (30 km) make it a residential community much sought after by the wealthiest households. The commune is composed of Morainvilliers and also of a small village, Bures.

== Population ==
Historical population
Year	Pop.	±% p.a.
1968	1,019	—
1975	1,286	+3.38%
1982	1,428	+1.51%
1990	1,614	+1.54%
1999	2,193	+3.46%
2007	2,387	+1.07%
2012	2,547	+1.31%
2017	2,930	+2.84%
2023	3,120	+1.05%
Source: INSEE

== See also ==
- Communes of the Yvelines department
