= Triel-sur-Seine =

- Commune
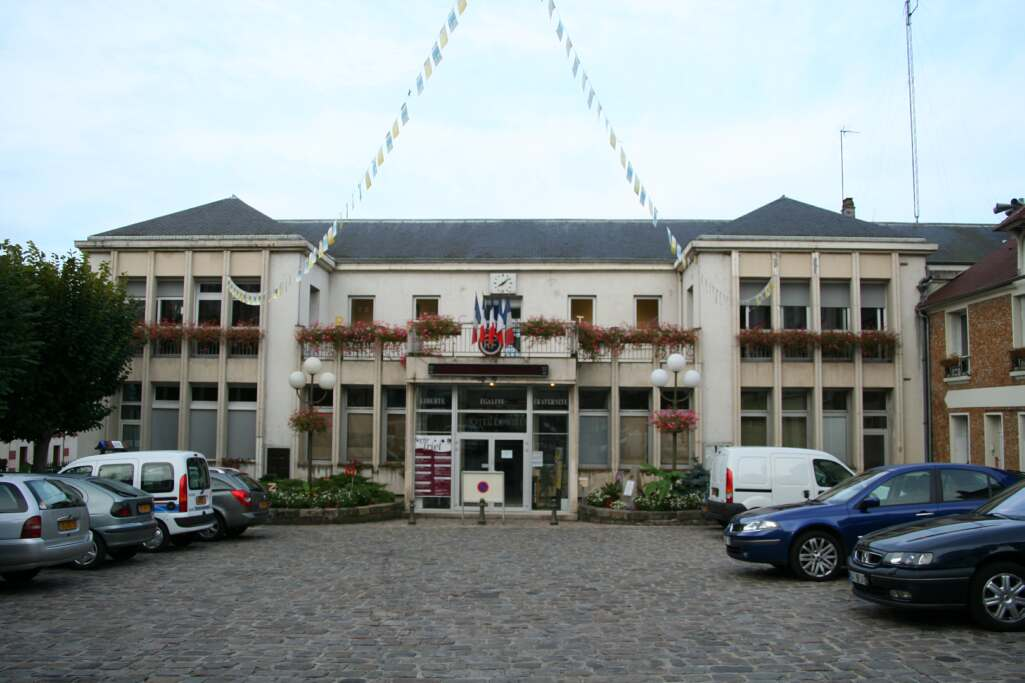
- Town hall

- Coat of arms
- Location of Triel-sur-Seine
- Location within France Location within Île-de-France (region)
- Coordinates: 48°58′54″N 2°00′25″E
- Country: France
- Region: Île-de-France
- Department: Yvelines
- Arrondissement: Saint-Germain-en-Laye
- Canton: Verneuil-sur-Seine
- Intercommunality: CU Grand Paris Seine et Oise

Government
  - Mayor (2020–2026): Cédric Aoun
- Area^{1}: 13.58 km^{2} (5.24 sq mi)
- Elevation: 20 m (66 ft)
- Highest elevation: 179 m (587 ft)
- Lowest elevation: 18 m (59 ft)
- Population (2023): 12,206
  - Density: 898.8/km^{2} (2,328/sq mi)
- Time zone: UTC+01:00 (CET)
  - Summer (DST): UTC+02:00 (CEST)
- INSEE/Postal code: 78624 /78510
- ^{1} French Land Register data, which excludes lakes, ponds, glaciers > 1 km^{2} (0.386 sq mi or 247 acres) and river estuaries.

Triel-sur-Seine (French pronunciation: [tʁijɛl syʁ sɛn], literally Triel on Seine) is a commune in the Yvelines department in the Île-de-France in north-central France. It is positioned approximately 11 km (6.8 mi) to the north-west of Saint-Germain-en-Laye.

The city is known for the "Fête du Flan", literally Flan Party, which takes place every last weekend of September on the banks of the Seine. This is a garage sale. The bakeries of the city have on this occasion several stands on which it is possible to consume flan. The city entered the Guinness Book in 1995 for having made the largest flan in the world (5.10 m in diameter).

== Population ==
Inhabitants are known in French as Triellois or Trielloises according to gender.

Historical population
| Year | Pop. | ±% p.a. |
|---|---|---|
| 1968 | 5,635 | — |
| 1975 | 6,944 | +3.03% |
| 1982 | 7,882 | +1.83% |
| 1990 | 9,615 | +2.52% |
| 1999 | 11,097 | +1.61% |
| 2007 | 11,957 | +0.94% |
| 2012 | 11,431 | −0.90% |
| 2017 | 11,892 | +0.79% |
| 2023 | 12,206 | +0.44% |
Source: INSEE

== Twin towns ==
(Germany) Seligenstadt, located in the south-east of Frankfurt, twinned since 1967. Triel-Seligenstadt was elected "Jumelage emblème de l'amitié franco-allemande" (Twin towns symbol of the french-german friendship) in June 2013.

(United Kingdom) Leatherhead, located in Surrey, England, twinned since 2004.

== See also ==
- Communes of the Yvelines department
- Local newspaper : Journal des Deux Rives
