= Canton of Conflans-Sainte-Honorine =

Coordinates: 49.00°N 2.09°E

The canton of Conflans-Sainte-Honorine is an administrative division of the Yvelines department, northern France. Its borders were modified at the French canton reorganisation which came into effect in March 2015. Its seat is in Conflans-Sainte-Honorine.

It consists of the following communes:

1. Andrésy
2. Chanteloup-les-Vignes
3. Conflans-Sainte-Honorine
4. Maurecourt
