= Vernouillet, Yvelines =

Vernouillet
- Commune
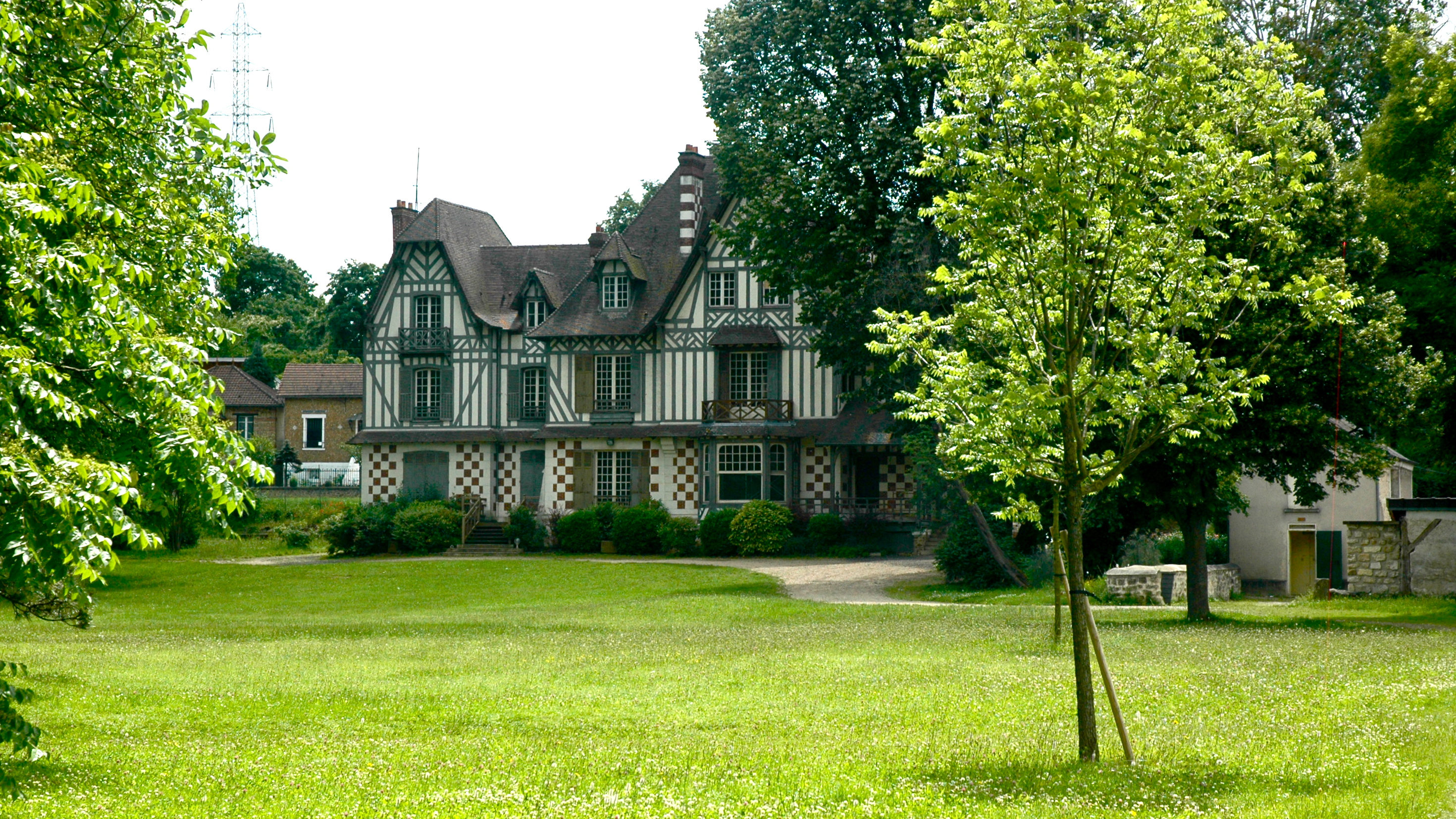
- The Maison des Buissons

- Coat of arms
- Location of Vernouillet
- Location within France Location within Île-de-France (region)
- Coordinates: 48°58′22″N 1°59′03″E
- Country: France
- Region: Île-de-France
- Department: Yvelines
- Arrondissement: Saint-Germain-en-Laye
- Canton: Verneuil-sur-Seine
- Intercommunality: CU Grand Paris Seine et Oise

Government
  - Mayor (2020–2026): Pascal Collado
- Area^{1}: 6.48 km^{2} (2.50 sq mi)
- Elevation: 24 m (79 ft)
- Highest elevation: 169 m (554 ft)
- Lowest elevation: 19 m (62 ft)
- Population (2023): 9,699
  - Density: 1,500/km^{2} (3,880/sq mi)
- Time zone: UTC+01:00 (CET)
  - Summer (DST): UTC+02:00 (CEST)
- INSEE/Postal code: 78643 /78540
- ^{1} French Land Register data, which excludes lakes, ponds, glaciers > 1 km^{2} (0.386 sq mi or 247 acres) and river estuaries.

Vernouillet (French pronunciation: [vɛʁnujɛ]) is a commune in the Yvelines department in the Île-de-France in north-central France.

== Population ==
Historical population
Year	Pop.	±% p.a.
1968	5,872	—
1975	6,168	+0.71%
1982	6,424	+0.58%
1990	8,676	+3.83%
1999	9,471	+0.98%
2007	9,356	−0.15%
2012	9,383	+0.06%
2017	10,048	+1.38%
2023	9,699	−0.59%
Source: INSEE

== Twin towns – sister cities ==
Vernouillet is twinned with:

- Hainburg, Germany (1962)
- Alberndorf im Pulkautal, Austria (1972)
- Trumau, Austria (1977)
- Yarm, England, United Kingdom (1985)

== See also ==
- Communes of the Yvelines department
