= Chavenay =

- Commune
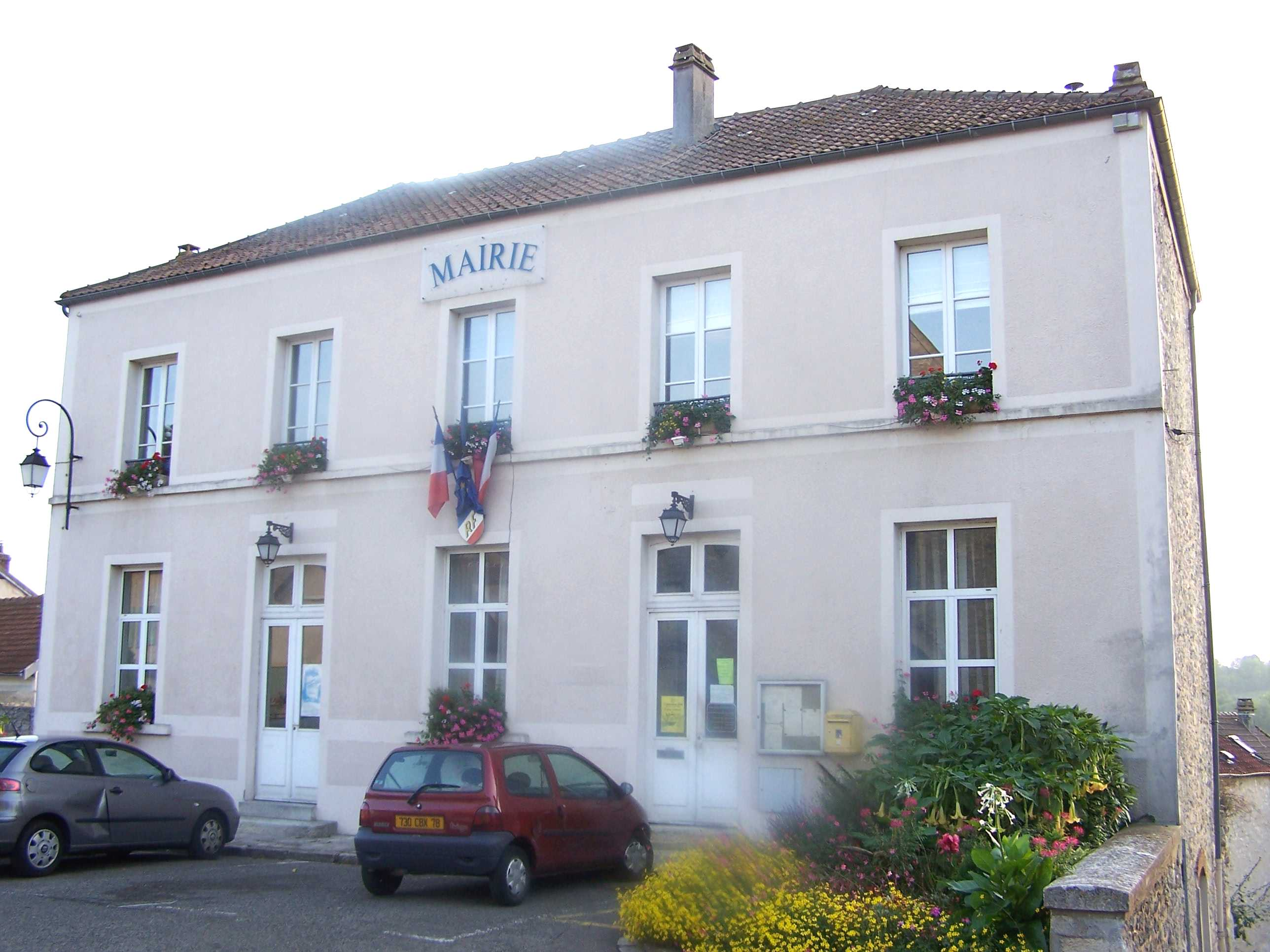
- The town hall in Chavenay

- Coat of arms
- Location of Chavenay
- Location within France Location within Île-de-France (region)
- Coordinates: 48°51′16″N 1°59′14″E
- Country: France
- Region: Île-de-France
- Department: Yvelines
- Arrondissement: Saint-Germain-en-Laye
- Canton: Saint-Cyr-l'École

Government
  - Mayor (2020–2026): Myriam Brenac
- Area^{1}: 6.03 km^{2} (2.33 sq mi)
- Elevation: 100 m (330 ft)
- Highest elevation: 129 m (423 ft)
- Lowest elevation: 71 m (233 ft)
- Population (2023): 1,723
  - Density: 286/km^{2} (740/sq mi)
- Time zone: UTC+01:00 (CET)
  - Summer (DST): UTC+02:00 (CEST)
- INSEE/Postal code: 78152 /78450
- ^{1} French Land Register data, which excludes lakes, ponds, glaciers > 1 km^{2} (0.386 sq mi or 247 acres) and river estuaries.

Chavenay (French pronunciation: [ʃavnɛ]), also known as Vallon de Chavenay, is a commune in the Yvelines department in the Île-de-France region in north-central France. It is located close to Saint-Nom-la-Bretèche, Saint-Germain-en-Laye, and Versailles.

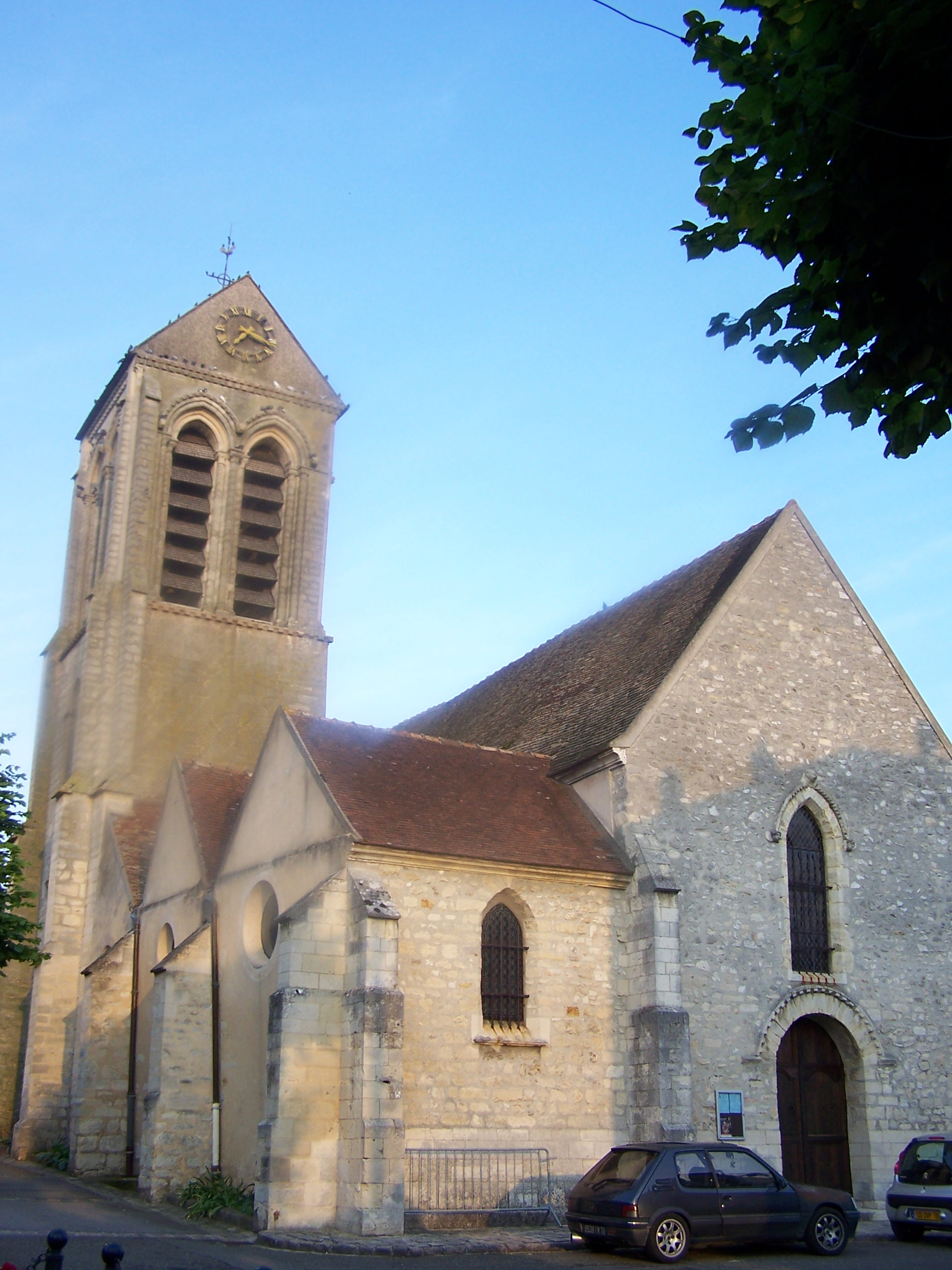
Chavenay church

== Twin towns ==
Along with Crespières, Feucherolles and Saint-Nom-la-Bretèche Chavenay is twinned with Rösrath, Germany.

== See also ==
- Communes of the Yvelines department
