= Crespières =

- Commune
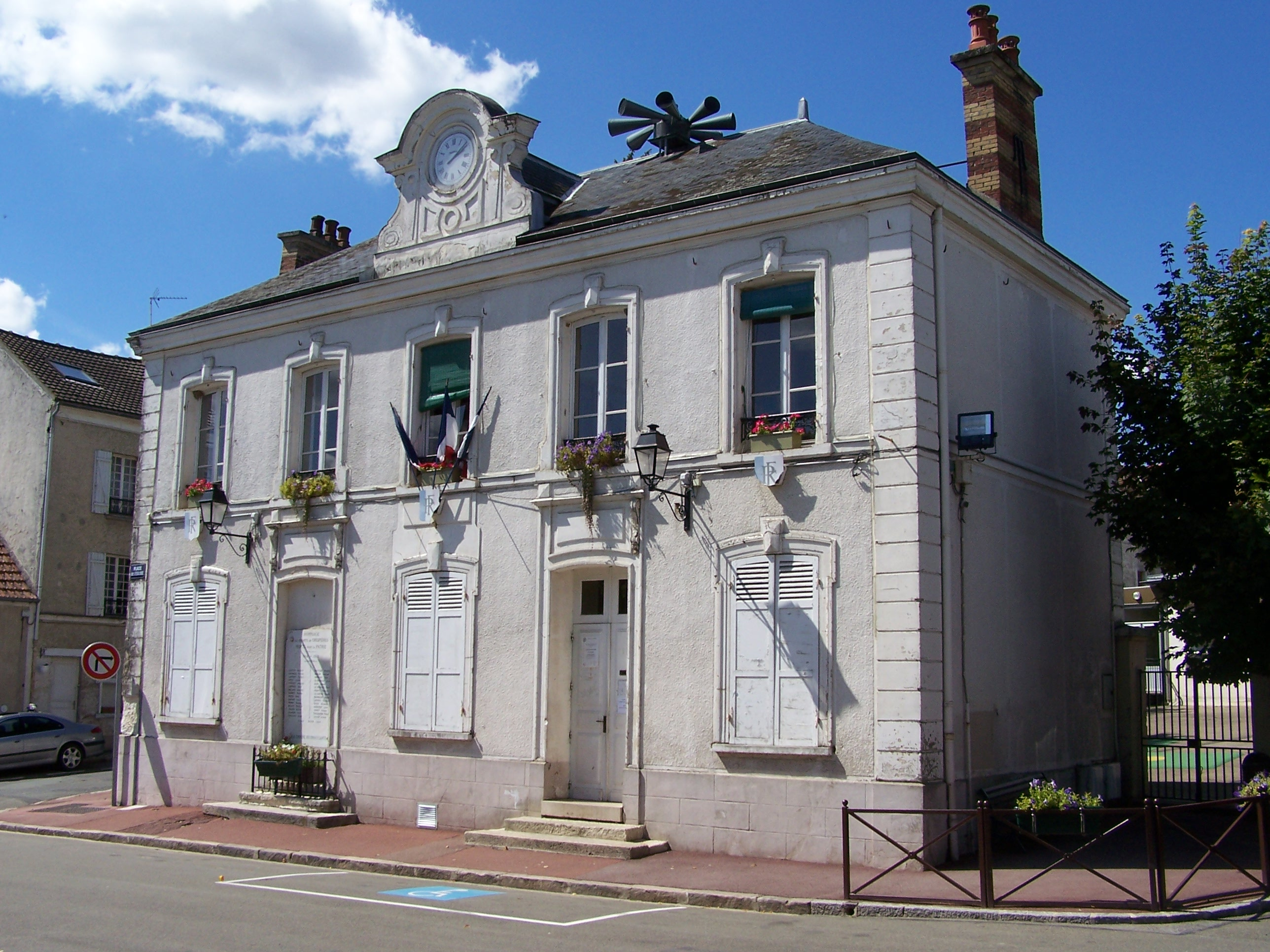
- Town hall

- Coat of arms
- Location of Crespières
- Location within France Location within Île-de-France (region)
- Coordinates: 48°53′02″N 1°55′21″E
- Country: France
- Region: Île-de-France
- Department: Yvelines
- Arrondissement: Saint-Germain-en-Laye
- Canton: Verneuil-sur-Seine

Government
  - Mayor (2020–2026): Adriano Ballarin
- Area^{1}: 14.91 km^{2} (5.76 sq mi)
- Elevation: 122 m (400 ft)
- Highest elevation: 185 m (607 ft)
- Lowest elevation: 43 m (141 ft)
- Population (2023): 1,719
  - Density: 115.3/km^{2} (298.6/sq mi)
- Time zone: UTC+01:00 (CET)
  - Summer (DST): UTC+02:00 (CEST)
- INSEE/Postal code: 78189 /78121
- ^{1} French Land Register data, which excludes lakes, ponds, glaciers > 1 km^{2} (0.386 sq mi or 247 acres) and river estuaries.

Crespières (French pronunciation: [kʁɛpjɛʁ]) is a commune in the Yvelines department in the Île-de-France region in north-central France.

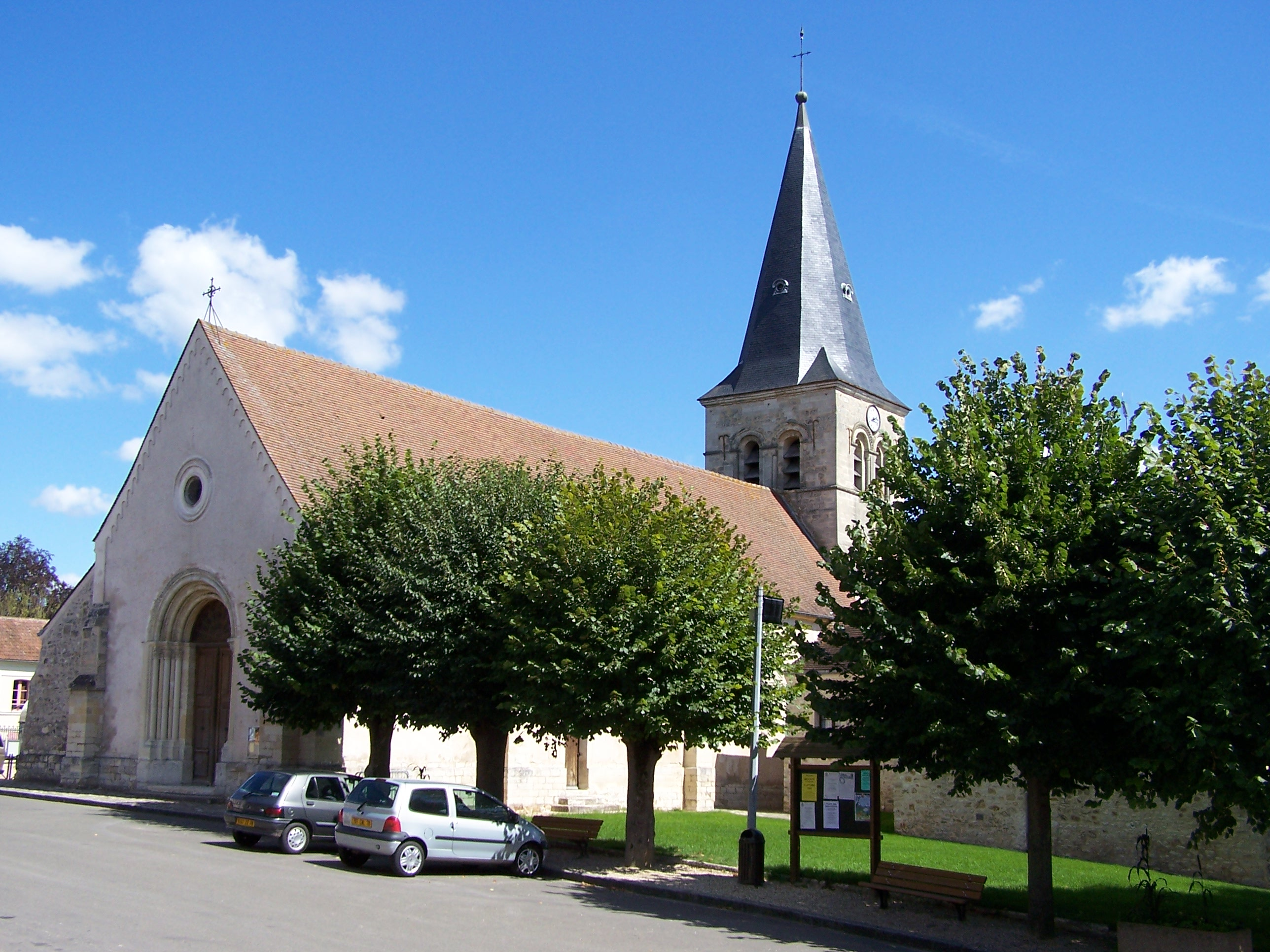
Saint-Martin

== Twin towns ==
Along with Chavenay, Feucherolles and Saint-Nom-la-Bretèche Crespières is twinned with Rösrath, Germany.

== See also ==
- Communes of the Yvelines department
