= Les Alluets-le-Roi =

- Commune
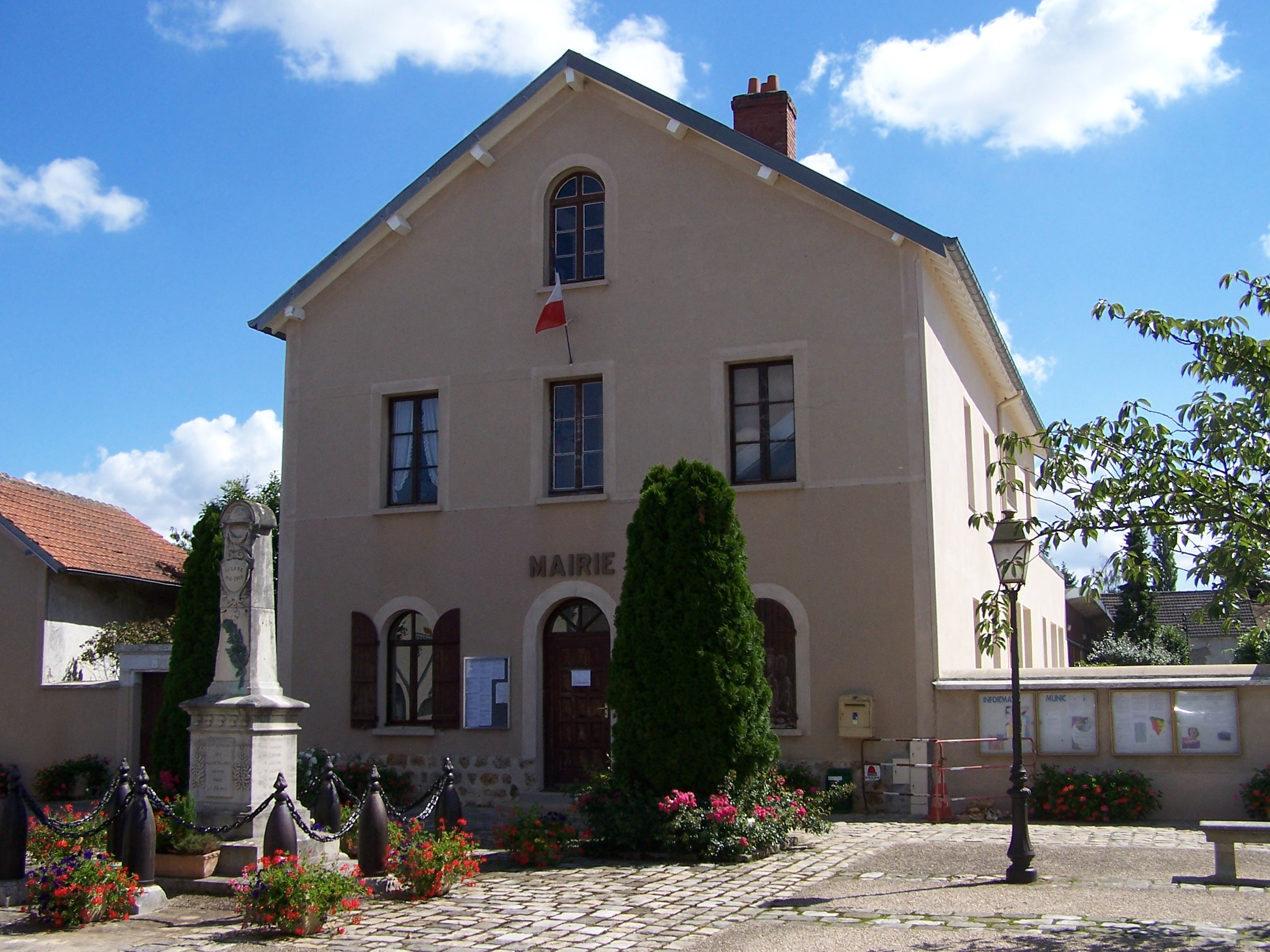
- Town hall

- Coat of arms
- Location of Les Alluets-le-Roi
- Location within France Location within Île-de-France (region)
- Coordinates: 48°54′54″N 1°55′12″E
- Country: France
- Region: Île-de-France
- Department: Yvelines
- Arrondissement: Saint-Germain-en-Laye
- Canton: Verneuil-sur-Seine
- Intercommunality: CU Grand Paris Seine et Oise

Government
  - Mayor (2020–2026): Véronique Houllier
- Area^{1}: 7.39 km^{2} (2.85 sq mi)
- Elevation: 180 m (590 ft)
- Highest elevation: 187 m (614 ft)
- Lowest elevation: 150 m (490 ft)
- Population (2023): 1,390
  - Density: 188/km^{2} (487/sq mi)
- Time zone: UTC+01:00 (CET)
  - Summer (DST): UTC+02:00 (CEST)
- INSEE/Postal code: 78010 /78580
- ^{1} French Land Register data, which excludes lakes, ponds, glaciers > 1 km^{2} (0.386 sq mi or 247 acres) and river estuaries.

Les Alluets-le-Roi (French pronunciation: [le.z‿alɥɛ lə ʁwa]) is a commune in the Yvelines department in northern France.

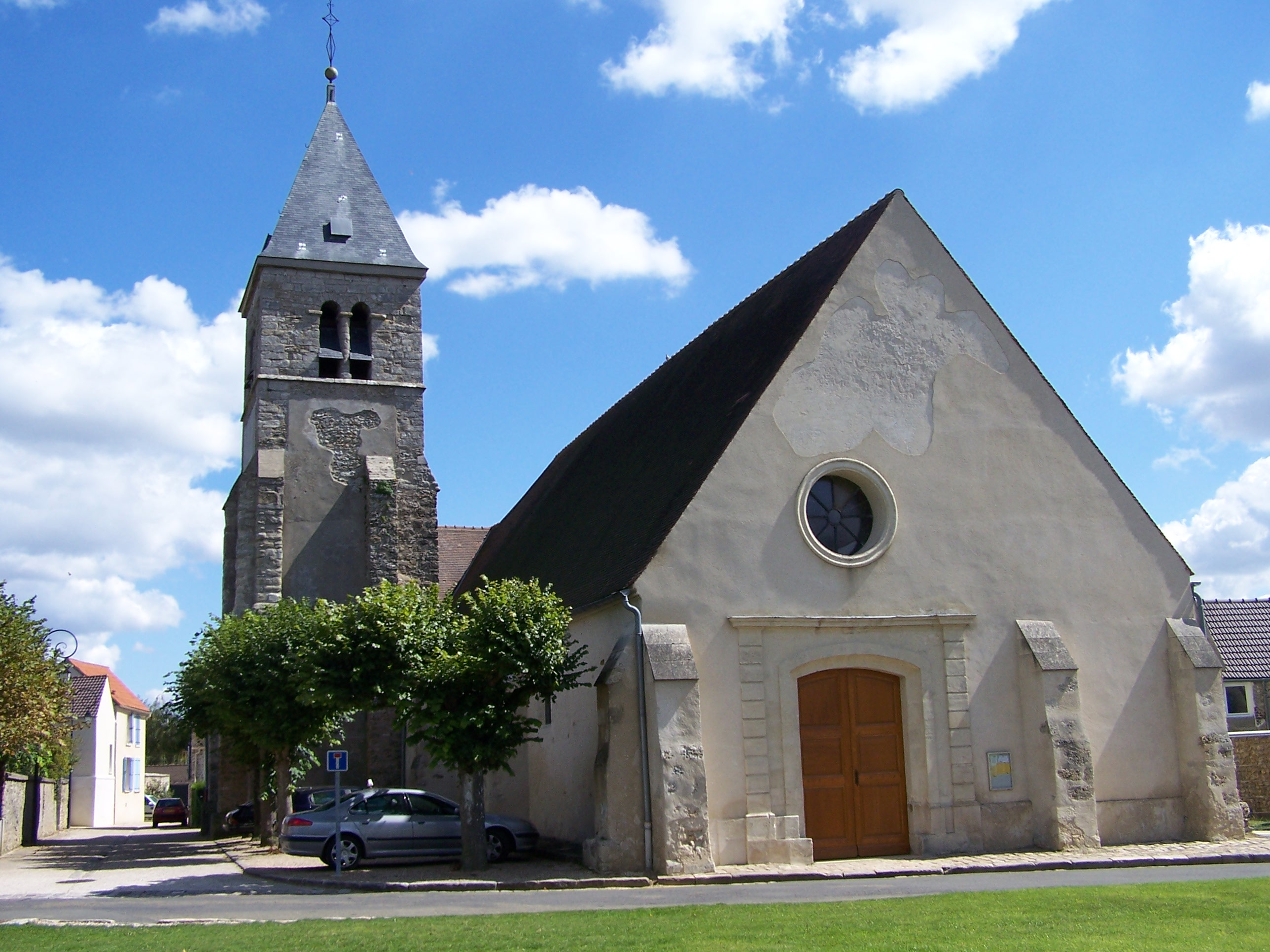
Saint-Nicolas church

== Population ==
Historical population
Year	Pop.	±% p.a.
1968	483	—
1975	632	+3.92%
1982	826	+3.90%
1990	1,062	+3.19%
1999	1,270	+2.01%
2007	1,200	−0.71%
2012	1,218	+0.30%
2017	1,201	−0.28%
2023	1,390	+2.47%
Source: INSEE

== See also ==
- Communes of the Yvelines department
