= Ziffer =

Ziffer is a surname. Notable people with the surname include:

- Benny Ziffer (born 1953), Israeli writer and journalist
- Frances Ziffer (1917–1996), American composer, conductor and pianist
- Irit Ziffer (born 1954), Israeli archaeologist and art historian
- Moshe Ziffer (1902–1989), Israeli artist and sculptor
- Sándor Ziffer (1880–1962), Hungarian painter
- Tommaso Ziffer, Italian architect and interior designer
- Wolfgang Ziffer (1941–2022), German actor
