= Valentino (fashion designer) =

Italian fashion designer (1932–2026)

Valentino OMRI OML
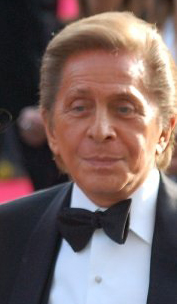
- Valentino at the 2007 Cannes Film Festival
- Born: Valentino Clemente Ludovico Garavani; 11 May 1932; Voghera, Lombardy, Kingdom of Italy
- Died: 19 January 2026 (aged 93); Rome, Lazio, Italy
- Education: Beaux-Arts de Paris; École de la Chambre Syndicale
- Label: Valentino
- Partner: Giancarlo Giammetti (1960–2026)
- Awards: Knight Grand Cross of the Order of Merit of the Italian Republic; Knight of the Order of Merit for Labour; Knight of the Legion of Honour; Commander of the Order of Arts and Letters; Medal of the City of Paris
- Website: valentino.com

Valentino Clemente Ludovico Garavani (Italian: [valenˈtiːno ɡaraˈvaːni]; 11 May 1932 – 19 January 2026), known mononymously as Valentino, was an Italian fashion designer who founded Valentino S.p.A., a luxury fashion house, in 1960 and served as its creative director until 2007. A flamboyant designer noted for his retro pieces and celebrity collaborations, he is regarded as one of the preeminent figures in haute couture.

Born in Voghera, Valentino apprenticed in fashion design at a young age before moving to Paris to continue his studies. After attending the Beaux-Arts de Paris and the École de la Chambre Syndicale, he began his career at Jean Dessès and Guy Laroche, later returning to Rome to work under Emilio Schuberth and Vincenzo Ferdinandi. He had opened his own fashion house on Via Condotti in 1960, achieving international recognition during the mid‑1960s. The Valentino brand continued to establish itself as a leading force in high fashion throughout the 1970s and 1980s, at one point becoming the best-selling Italian fashion export. He was the first Italian designer to feature on Parisian haute couture catwalks. His work further established itself as a staple of celebrity culture during the 1990s.

Valentino and his partner, Giancarlo Giammetti, sold the company to HdP Group for US$300 million in 1998. He presented his final haute couture show in 2008, having stepped down as creative director the previous year. He was appointed a Knight Grand Cross of the Order of Merit of the Italian Republic in 1986 and a Knight of the Order of Merit for Labour in 1996, and was also made a Knight of the Legion of Honour and a Commander of the Order of Arts and Letters in France, where he received the Medal of the City of Paris.

== Early life and education ==
Valentino Clemente Ludovico Garavani was born on 11 May 1932 in Voghera, in the region of Lombardy, to Mauro Garavani and Teresa de Biaggi. His mother named him after Rudolph Valentino, a matinée idol of the 1920s. He developed an interest in fashion while still at primary school in Voghera, apprenticing under his aunt Rosa and local designer Ernestina Salvadeo, an aunt of the artist Aldo Giorgini. He later moved to Paris to pursue this interest with the support of his parents, where he studied at the Beaux-Arts and the École de la Chambre Syndicale, aged 18.

== Career ==
=== Beginnings in Paris and return to Italy (1951–1959) ===
Rosso Valentino

Color coordinates
- Hex triplet: #E4002B
- sRGB^{B} (r, g, b): (228, 0, 43)
- CMYK^{H} (c, m, y, k): (0, 100, 80, 0)
- HSV (h, s, v): (349°, 100%, 89%)
- CIELCh_{uv} (L, C, h): (48, 154, 10°)
- Source: valentino.com: Chiffon Short Dress
- B: Normalized to [0–255] (byte); H: Normalized to [0–100] (hundred)

Valentino secured a position with Jean Dessès for an apprenticeship in Paris when 19, having first joined Jacques Fath, followed by Balenciaga and Dior. While an apprentice with Dessès, he assisted Countess Jacqueline de Ribes by sketching her dress ideas.

After five years, Valentino departed following an incident during an extended holiday in Saint-Tropez. He joined his friend Guy Laroche in 1956. After discussions with his parents, he opted to return to Italy and established himself in Rome in 1959, first as a pupil of Emilio Schuberth and then as a collaborator in Vincenzo Ferdinandi's atelier, prior to opening his own fashion house.

=== Founding of Valentino (1960–1961) ===
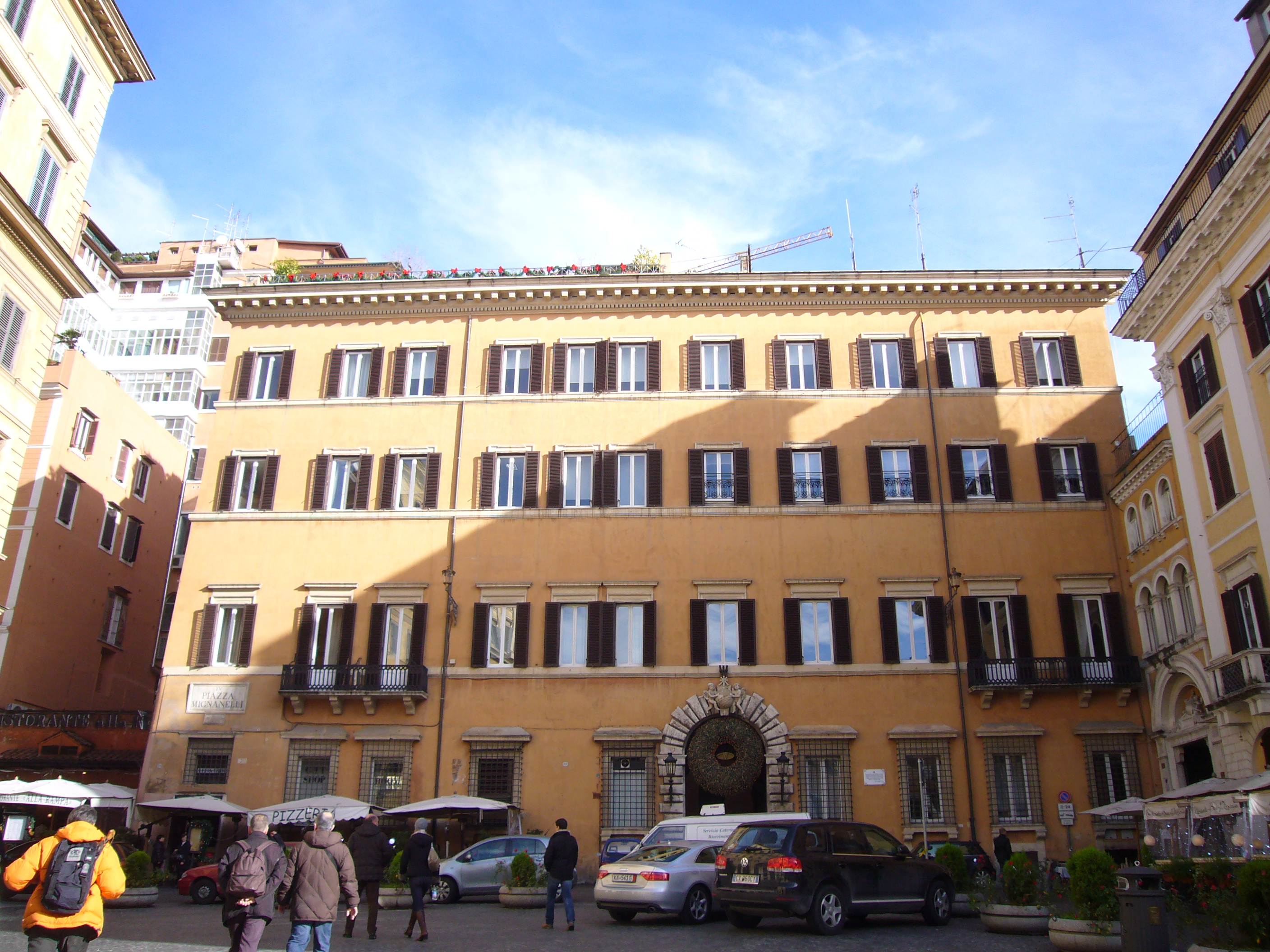
Palazzo Gabrielli-Mignanelli, Valentino's Roman residence

In 1960, Valentino left Paris and opened a fashion house in Rome on the fashionable Via Condotti, supported by his father and a business associate. More than a simple atelier, his father said the premises resembled a maison de haute couture (lit. 'house of haute couture'); the operation was notably grand, with models flown in from Paris for his debut show. Valentino soon became known for his red dresses, in the vivid shade that the fashion industry remembered as Rosso Valentino.

On 31 July 1960, Valentino met Giancarlo Giammetti at the Café de Paris on the Via Veneto in Rome. Giammetti, one of three children, was in his second year of architecture school and living with his parents in the haut bourgeois Parioli district. That day, he gave Valentino a lift home in his Fiat, beginning a friendship that soon developed into a long‑lasting partnership. Giammetti left for a holiday in Capri the following day and, by coincidence, Valentino was also travelling there; they met again on the island 10 days later. Shortly afterwards, Giammetti abandoned his university studies to become Valentino's business partner and life partner. When he joined the enterprise, the financial situation of Valentino's atelier was precarious: within a year, Valentino's excessive expenditure led his father's associate to withdraw from the business, leaving him close to bankruptcy. In 1961, Elizabeth Taylor, who was in Rome for the filming of Cleopatra, chose Valentino's white haute couture column for the premiere of Spartacus.

=== Breakthrough in Florence (1962–1969) ===
Valentino's international debut took place in 1962 in Florence, then the Italian fashion capital. Former first lady of the United States, Jacqueline Kennedy, had seen Gloria Schiff—the twin sister of the Rome-based fashion editor of American Vogue and Valentino's friend Consuelo Crespi—wearing a two-piece ensemble in black organza at a gathering in 1964. It made such an impression that Kennedy contacted Schiff to learn the name of the ensemble's designer: Valentino. In September 1964, Valentino was in the United States to present a collection of his work at a charity ball at the Waldorf-Astoria New York. Kennedy wanted to view the collection but could not attend the event, so Valentino decided to send a model, sales representative, and a selection of key pieces from his collection to Kennedy's apartment on Fifth Avenue. Kennedy ordered six of his haute couture dresses, all in black-and-white, and wore them during her year of mourning following the assassination of her husband, President John F. Kennedy. From then on, she became a devoted client and friend of Valentino. Valentino later designed the white gown worn by Kennedy at her wedding to Greek business magnate Aristotle Onassis. In 1966, he moved his shows from Florence to Rome, where the following year he produced an all-white collection that became famous for the "V" logo he designed. His all-white couture collection of 1968 set him "solidly in the firmature of Italian design", described by Vogue as "the talk of Europe". He was the first Italian designer to feature in the Paris haute couture scene.

=== Switch to retro styles and international fame (1970–1979) ===
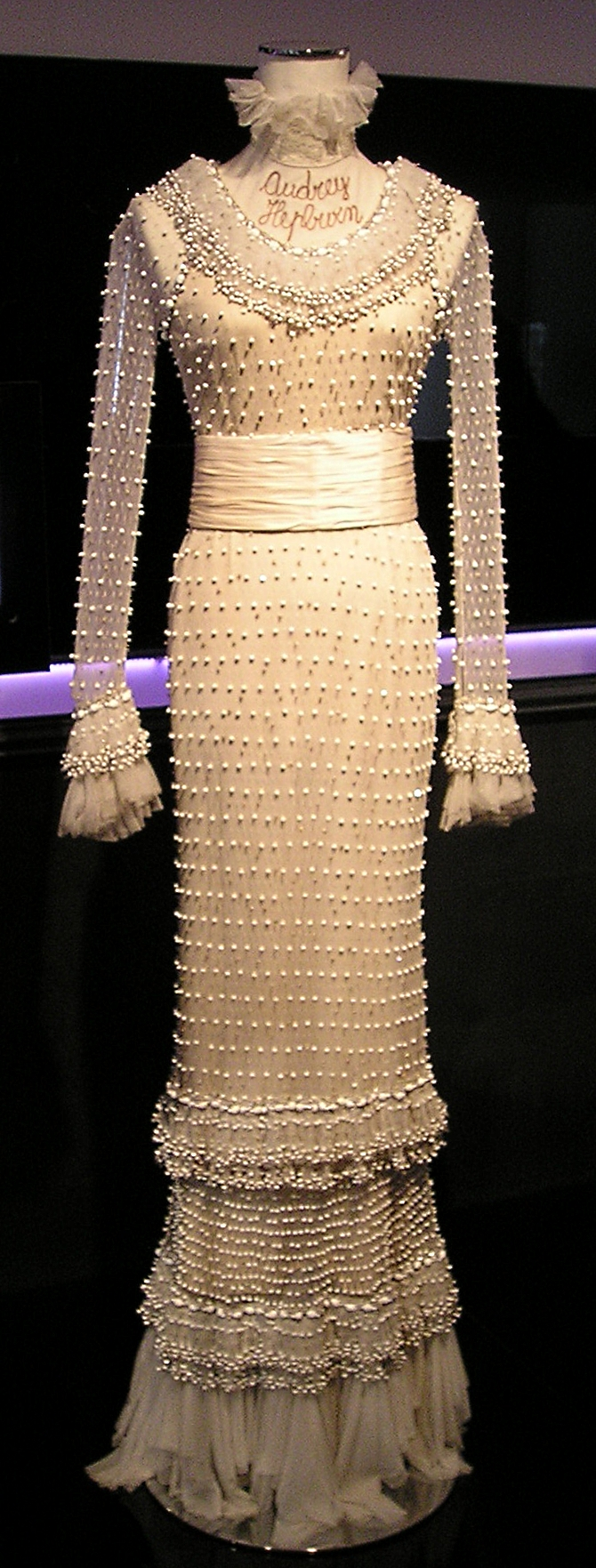
A dress worn by Audrey Hepburn at The Proust Ball at Château de Ferrières in 1971

Throughout the 1970s, Valentino's womenswear for both couture and ready-to-wear generally followed the trends of the time, opening the decade with an emphasis on midi-skirts worn over miniskirts; fitted, knee-high boots; trousers; and foreign looks. In 1971, he paired more brightly colored midis and knee-length skirts with that year's vogue for hot pants, also continuing to show trousers like culottes and knickers with the gently flared standard trouser of the time. He was noted for his tailored clothes. The 1940s revival was his focus for a time, and Valentino showed platform shoes, padded shoulders, and knee-length skirts, all along with occasional forays into 1930s and 1950s styles, kept modern by an emphasis on pants.

In 1972, he started the year favoring trousers but ended it showing only skirts, including being one of the only designers to present day dresses in a period dominated by separates. He endorsed the favored full sleeves and layering that were seen on many runways and continued to move away from his trademark monotone or bicolor palette—often cream or red. A knee-length, square-shouldered 1940s revival was prevalent again in 1973, continuing with bright prints, including a Bakst influence. During this era, his evening styles were often ruffled and sometimes had asymmetric hems, other times a single, barely discernible letter on a belt or scarf.

The mid-1970s move toward fuller peasant silhouettes was seen in Valentino's work somewhat—dirndl skirts, off-the-shoulder flounces, petticoats, blousons, shawls, ponchos, and layering—but he deemphasized the look's characteristic boots and was sometimes criticized for including styles that were too heavily constructed and stiff in this period of minimal construction and flowing shapes, as well as for emphasizing conspicuous-consumption wealth projection during the more egalitarian atmosphere of the time. He then returned to his serviceable presentation of monochrome and bicolor garment groupings.

With the Fall 1978 move towards big shoulders, formal suits, and a more conspicuous consumption, mid–20th century retro style, Valentino presented shapes that echoed the big shoulders of the 1930s and adopted the seductive styles being favored by designers in narrow, slit skirts and black bras worn on their own under padded-shoulder jackets. Along with many other designers, he continued to show this style the following year in stiffly structured, broad-shouldered jackets and dresses presented with retro accessories such as hats, gloves, and cinch belts. This padded-shoulder, high-glamour style would continue to dominate fashion into the 1980s and bring Valentino unprecedented fame. Throughout the 1970s, Valentino spent considerable time in New York City, where his presence was embraced by society personalities such as Vogue's editor-in-chief Diana Vreeland and the art icon Andy Warhol.

=== Cultural prominence and acclaim (1980–1989) ===
Valentino is one of the favorite designers of actress Joan Collins, famous as one of the stars of the popular U.S. television show Dynasty (1981–1989), bringing the designer additional visibility and name recognition among the public. The era's conspicuous consumption, 1940s and 1950s–inspired ballgowns, cocktail dresses, and broad-shouldered, sharply tailored suits were taken up with aplomb by Valentino, whose style at the time was similar to that of Givenchy and Oscar de la Renta.

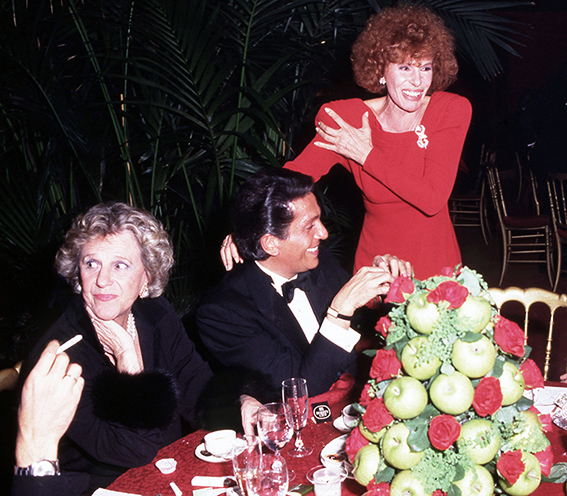
Valentino (center) with Ornella Vanoni and Anna Bonomi Bolchini in 1985

A few themes remained constant throughout his eighties collections: his familiar color groupings; his penchant for blatant displays of luxury, wealth, and opulence; broad shoulder padding; and a more comfortable cut than he was showing at the start of the big-shoulder era at the end of the 1970s. He continued to show his ready-to-wear collections in Paris and his couture collections in Rome. From 1983 to 1985, Valentino contributed a Valentino Edition to the Continental line of U.S. carmaker Lincoln. The uniforms worn by Italian athletes at the 1984 Summer Olympics, held in Los Angeles, were designed by Valentino. In 1986, Vogue reported that Valentino was the largest Italian fashion exporter, with international sales of US$385 million.

In the first half of the 1980s, he mostly followed the short, narrow skirt line with broad-shouldered tops also followed by Yves Saint Laurent, Givenchy, Emanuel Ungaro, and others, but also presented longer, looser looks, the chemise dresses of the era, and a variety of pant shapes. During the mid-1980s, the fashion press and buyers often rated him higher than other Paris designers, ranking him with Saint Laurent and Karl Lagerfeld. He felt confident enough with this elevated stature that, in 1985, he added his moniker to a line of designer jeans. Like other designers, he showed a variety of miniskirts throughout the eighties among his other lengths and garments, and he joined the rest of the fashion world in 1987–88 in showing almost exclusively mini lengths for two seasons and then followed his colleagues by the end of 1988 in retreating from an exclusive mini-length focus.

=== Accademia Valentino (1990–1997) ===
1990 marked the opening of the Accademia Valentino, designed by architect Tommaso Ziffer, a cultural space located near Valentino's atelier in Rome for the presentation of art exhibitions. The next year—encouraged by their friend Elizabeth Taylor—Valentino Garavani and Giancarlo Giammetti created L.I.F.E., an association for the support of HIV/AIDS–related patients, which benefitted from the activities of the Accademia Valentino. Throughout the 1990s, his work was seen as the antithesis of the dominant grunge trend, while becoming a staple of the rising celebrity culture.

=== Sale of company and retirement (1998–2008) ===
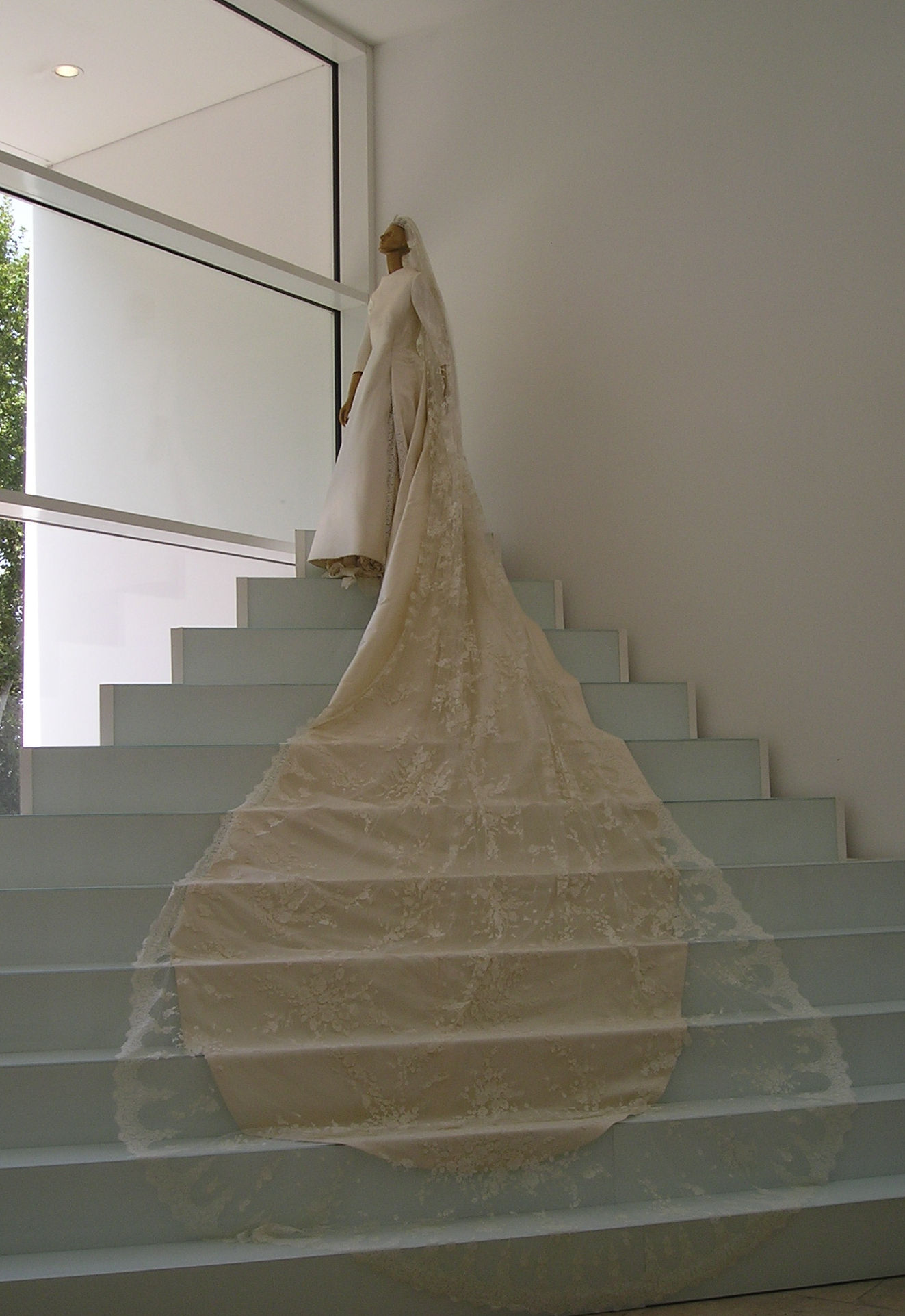
A wedding dress by Valentino

In 1998, Valentino and his partner Giammetti sold the company for approximately US$300 million to HdP, an Italian conglomerate controlled, in part, by Gianni Agnelli. In 2002, Valentino S.p.A.—with revenues of more than $180 million—was sold by HdP to Milan-based textiles giant Marzotto Group for $210 million, including lucrative deals for Valentino and Giammetti. The brand was owned by private equity group Permira from 2007 onwards, which had acquired the brand from the Marzotto Group for $3.5 billion. It was later sold to the Qatari royal family for €700 million through an investment vehicle called Mayhoola for Investments.

On 4 September 2007, Valentino announced that he would retire fully in January 2008 from the world stage after his final haute couture show in Paris. In October, he delivered his last women's ready-to-wear show in Paris, where he received a standing ovation. His last haute couture show was presented in Paris at the Musée Rodin on 23 January 2008. The show was somewhat marred by his criticism of fellow Italian design duo Dolce & Gabbana and the death of Australian actor Heath Ledger, although he received a five-minute standing ovation from an audience that included hundreds of notable names from all areas of show business. Many models returned to attend Valentino's last haute couture show; the audience included Eva Herzigová, Naomi Campbell, Claudia Schiffer, Nadja Auermann, Karolína Kurková, and Karen Mulder.

In September 2007, Valentino decided to depart his role as creative director. Maria Grazia Chiuri and Pierpaolo Piccioli were at that point first nominated as creative directors of all accessories lines. before Valentino returned to fulfill his roles in 2009 after the sacking of Alessandra Facchinetti in a public feud with Valentino and Giammetti. In July 2016, Piccioli assumed the role as Chiuri departed. In March 2024, it was announced that Alessandro Michele would take over as creative director following his departure from Gucci.

== In popular culture ==
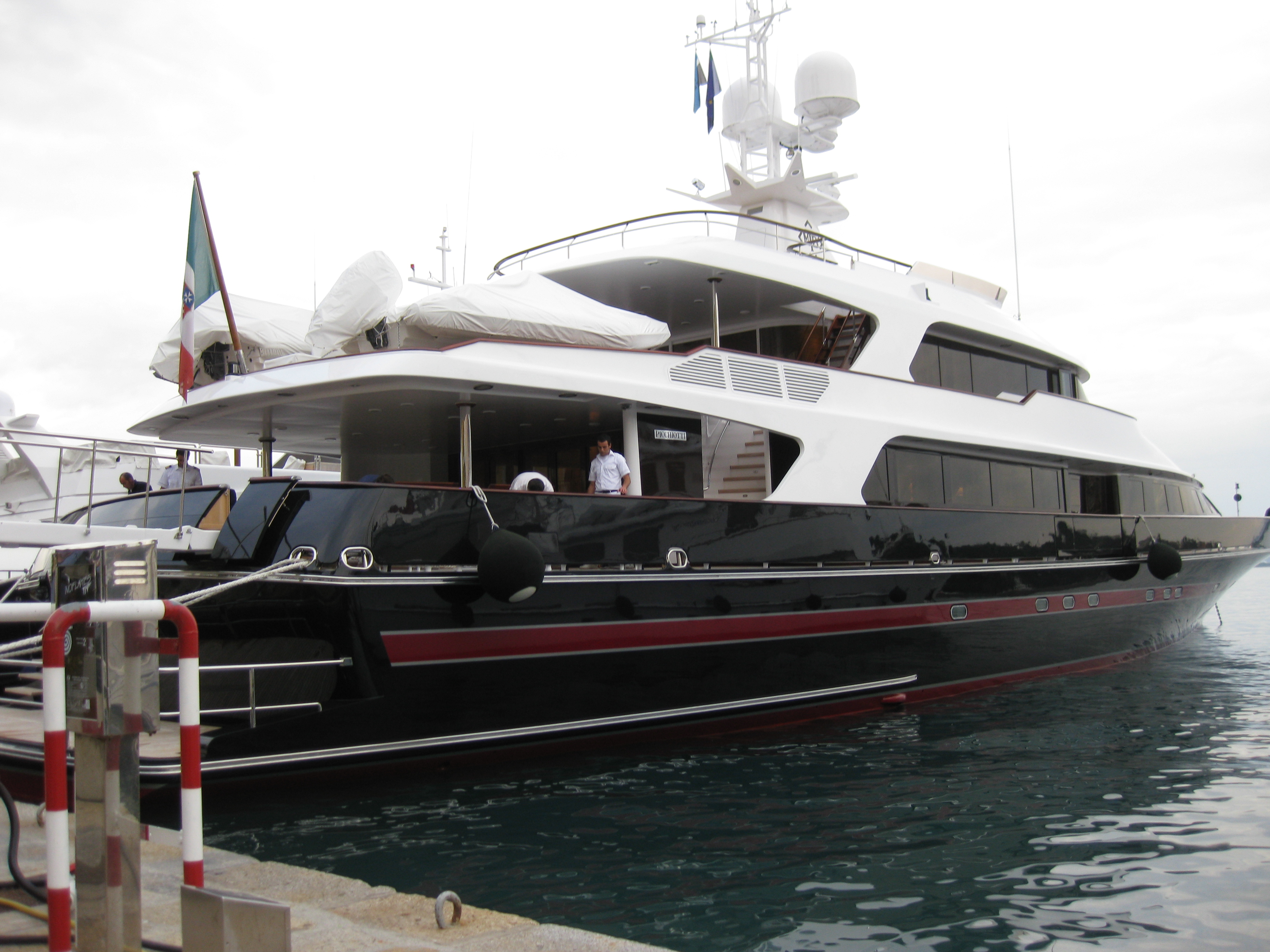
Valentino's yacht moored in Porto Santo Stefano, Monte Argentario, Tuscany, Italy

In 2006, Valentino appeared in a cameo role as himself in the hit film The Devil Wears Prada. Valentino: The Last Emperor, a feature-length documentary film on the designer, premiered at the 2008 Venice International Film Festival. Produced and directed by Matt Tyrnauer—special correspondent for Vanity Fair magazine—the film follows Valentino and his inner circle throughout various events, including an anniversary show celebrating his 45-year career.

From June 2005 to July 2007, 250 hours of footage was shot with exclusive, unprecedented access to Valentino and his entourage; Tyrnauer said "we were let in to the inner circle, but we had to stick it out for a long time, practically move in, to capture the truly great moments. [...] Valentino is surrounded by a tight-knit family of friends and employees, but, eventually, their guard came down and they forgot there was a camera crew in the room." The film had its North American premiere at the 2008 Toronto International Film Festival and was released theatrically in the United States on 18 March. The success of the film led to an increase in Hollywood fashion documentaries throughout the 2010s.

== Awards and honours ==
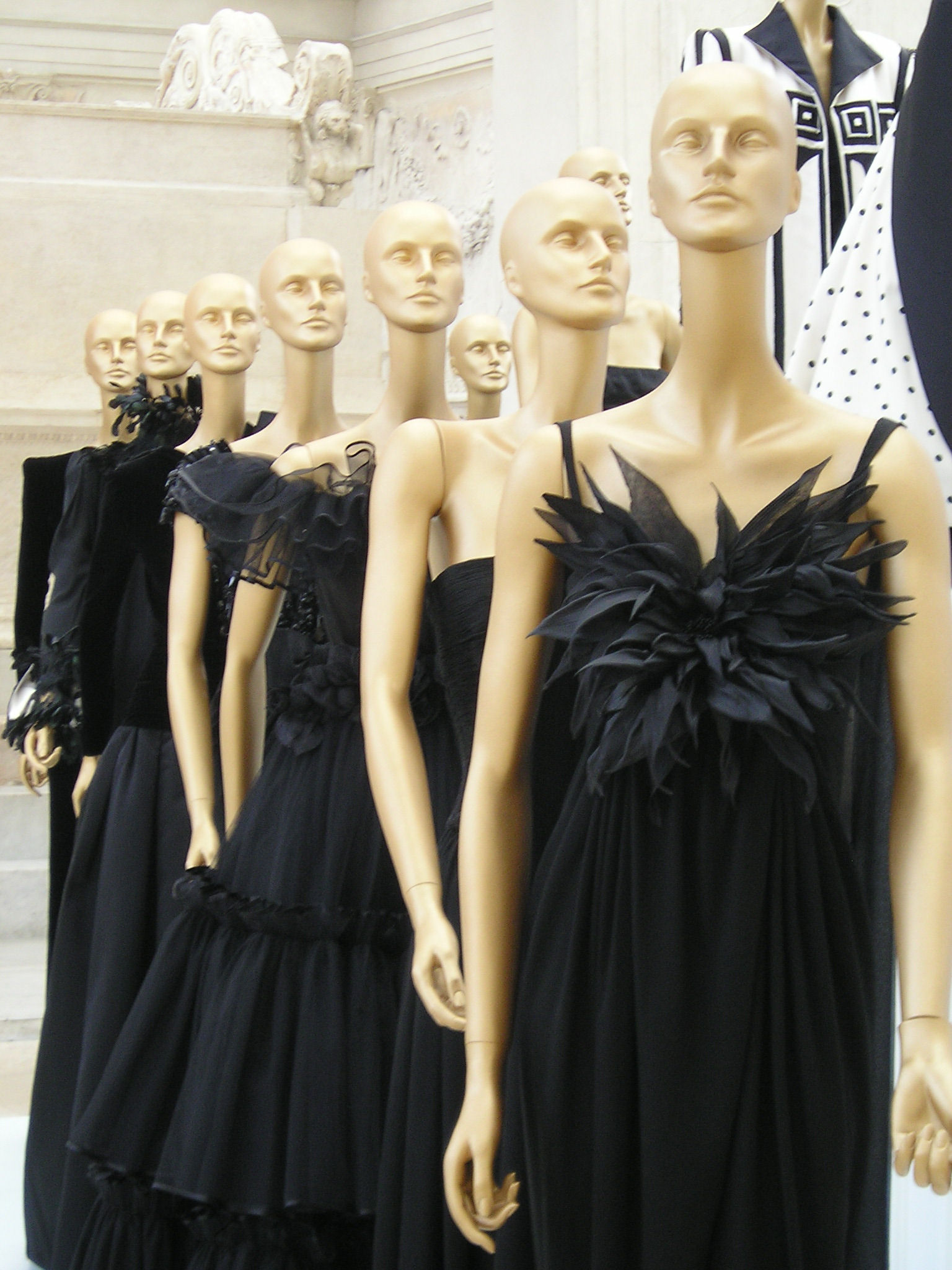
A collection of black dresses by Valentino at the Museo Ara Pacis in Rome

Valentino was appointed a Grand Officer of the Order of Merit of the Italian Republic in 1985, upgraded to Knight Grand Cross in 1986—the highest-ranking Italian honour—and a Knight of the Order of Merit for Labour in 1996. In July 2006, French president Jacques Chirac named Valentino a Knight of the Legion of Honour, the highest French order of chivalry. During the festivities for the 45th year of Valentino's international career in 2007, the Mayor of Rome—Walter Veltroni—announced that the site of the Valentino Museum would be a building near the Circus Maximus, which Valentino later snubbed in favour of a museum in Paris following the election of Gianni Alemanno, and awarded him with the freedom of the city of Rome. In 2008, Valentino was presented with the Medal of the City of Paris for his services to Parisian fashion. In 2012, he was named a Commander of the Order of Arts and Letters.

In September 2011, Valentino was presented with the sixth annual "Couture Council Award for Artistry of Fashion" from the Fashion Institute of Technology. In 2017, Valentino was the recipient of a Golden Plate Award of the American Academy of Achievement, presented by Jeremy Irons. In 2023, Valentino won the "Outstanding Achievement Award" at the Fashion Awards.

== Home decoration ==
Valentino and Giancarlo Giammetti shared homes and apartments around the world, including —

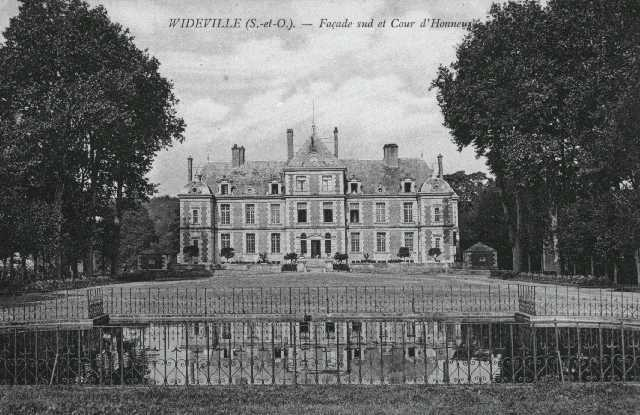
Château de Wideville, Valentino's château in Crespières, near Paris

- Villa on the Via Appia Antica, a historical landmark in Rome bought in 1972. The villa is decorated by Renzo Mongiardino and Adrian Magistretti with influences of China, Italy, and France.
- 19th century mansion in Holland Park, London. The centrepiece of this mansion is the grand salon that houses five late Picassos and a small salon with two Basquiats and one painting by Damien Hirst.
- Penthouse on Fifth Avenue in New York, near the Frick Museum overlooking Central Park decorated by Jacques Grange with paintings by Richard Prince, Jean-Michel Basquiat, Roy Lichtenstein, Andy Warhol, Willem de Kooning, and Fernand Léger.
- Château de Wideville, a castle in communes Crespières and Davron near Paris. The 17th-century château was built by Louis XIII's finance minister, later a home of a mistress of Louis XIV. Valentino acquired the eight-bedroom castle in 1995 and commissioned its restoration to the eminent interior decorator Henri Samuel. The castle's 280-acre gardens, designed by Wirtz International, include a pigeonnier tower, a pavilion containing a shell grotto, and a building housing the Valentino Garavani Archives. The chateau stairway is flanked by stone dogs carved in the 17th century by French artist Jacques Sarazin. Valentino always organized a theme party at the castle during the fashion weeks in Paris.
- Chalet Gifferhorn in Gstaad, Switzerland, where he spent winter celebrations. The house has paintings by Arcimboldo and sheep-shaped furniture by les Lalanne.

Valentino also spent half of his time in Giancarlo Giammetti's 18th-century Villa "La Vagnola" in Cetona, Tuscany which Giammetti purchased in 1986. Italian decorator Renzo Mongiardino created interiors inspired by the villa's classical gardens. For twenty-five years, Giammetti and Valentino vacationed there. He also had apartments in Paris and in Kensington, London.

== Personal life ==
Valentino remained always close to his mother, Teresa, who moved from Voghera to Rome to assist with the business. In Valentino: The Last Emperor (2008), Valentino and Giancarlo Giammetti recount meeting on 31 July 1960 on Via Veneto. They remained life partners for more than 65 years, although their romantic relationship ended in 1972. According to Giammetti's private memoirs, Valentino met 19‑year‑old Carlos Souza at the Hippopotamus Club in Rio de Janeiro in 1973, and the two dated until Souza married Brazilian socialite Charlene Shorto in 1983. Valentino and Giammetti later became godfathers to the couple's sons. Carlos and Charlene continued to work in public relations for Maison Valentino after their divorce in 1990, and maintained a close relationship with Valentino and Giammetti thereafter.

According to Giammetti's book Private, Valentino met his partner Bruce Hoeksema in the early 1980s. Hoeksema began as a model for the house before later becoming its vice‑president. In a 2007 interview, Valentino said that he had been in love once with a woman, Italian actress Marilù Tolo, to whom he unsuccessfully proposed in the early 1960s. Valentino and Tolo remained good friends.

Valentino and Giammetti's lifestyle had been considered flamboyant. John Fairchild, editor-at-large at Women's Wear Daily and W, told Vanity Fair,

Valentino and Giancarlo are the kings of high living. Every other designer looks and says, "How do they live the way they do?" I don't think they made the money that Valentino and Giancarlo did, because Giancarlo knows how to make money. If they did, they didn't spend the money like Valentino. No other designer ever did. When the terrorism first started in Rome – the period when the Red Brigades were kidnapping people – Valentino was riding around in a bulletproof Mercedes. And do you know what colour the Mercedes was? Red. My God, I thought, you must want to get blown up.

Valentino adored dogs to the point that he once named a second line of clothing after his late pug Oliver; he owned six pugs. When travelling on his 14-seat Challenger jet, Valentino and his entourage went to the airport in three cars: one for the staff and luggage, one for five of the pugs, and one for Giammetti, Valentino, and the pug Maude, who always travelled with Valentino.

== Death ==
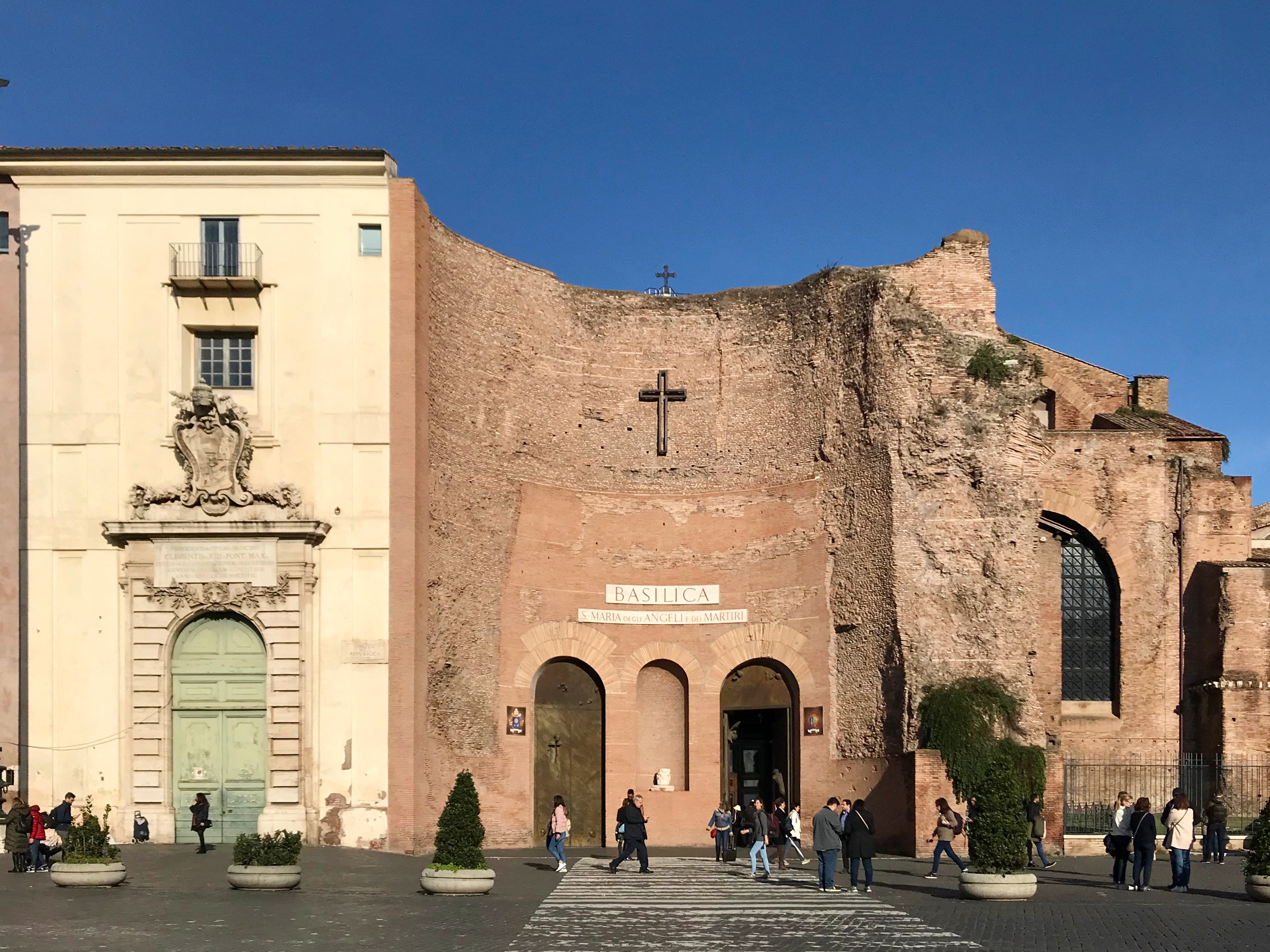
The Basilica of Saint Mary and the Martyrs, the place of his funeral

Valentino died in Rome on 19 January 2026, aged 93. His foundation announced that he died peacefully at his home in the city, surrounded by loved ones, from natural causes. He lay in state at Piazza Mignanelli 23 in Rome on 21–22 January. More than 10,000 people paid their respects at the coffin, in a simple, white, light-filled setting, with two crystal vases holding white roses, and his smiling portrait dominating the room. His funeral took place on 23 January at the Basilica of St Mary of the Angels and of the Martyrs.

After the funeral, he was buried at the Flaminio Cemetery in Prima Porta, where he was laid to rest in a family chapel he shared with Giammetti. He was buried in a circular tomb, with large windows and flowerbeds surrounding it, with the names Garavani and Giammetti already inscribed on the tomb.

=== Tributes ===
People from the worlds of fashion and entertainment reacted to Valentino's death with profound tributes, emphasizing his dedication to "beauty" and his creation of the iconic Rosso Valentino, as Italian prime minister Giorgia Meloni called him an "undisputed master of style" and a legend whose legacy would continue to inspire. President Sergio Mattarella praised his ability to look beyond conventions. Alessandro Michele, creative director of Maison Valentino, described him as a central figure in Italian cultural history who transformed a craft into a vision of the world. Donatella Versace called him a "true maestro" and a loyal friend who supported her following the assassination of her brother Gianni. Giorgio Armani's family commented that his passing left an "immense void" in the world of couture. Gwyneth Paltrow recalled his "naughty laugh" and his private love for beauty, family, and gardens. Claudia Schiffer and Cindy Crawford expressed heartbreak, with Schiffer citing her Valentino wedding gown as a constant reminder of his generosity. Sophia Loren noted his "warmth and kind soul" and how his art would remain a forever source of inspiration.

== Legacy ==
Valentino has been widely nicknamed the "Last Emperor of Fashion", the name of his documentary. The British Fashion Council remarked in 2023 that his "extraordinary designs, dedication to craftsmanship, ubiquitous branding and business acumen have left an indelible mark on the fashion world and cemented him as a legend of haute couture", while CEO Caroline Rush added that "Valentino is a true visionary whose boundless creativity, innovative designs, and dedication to craftsmanship, have revolutionised the fashion industry."

In his obituary, The New York Times described him as "the last of the great 20th-century couturiers and a designer who defined the image of royalty in a republican age for all manner of princesses—crowned, deposed, Hollywood and society". Vogue described him as "one of the key architects of late 20th century glamour", adding that "there is a certain polish and formality to Valentino's work that speaks to an earlier age of glamour and the beginnings of the jet set, which is now a thing of the past." NBC described his impact on the fashion industry as he "scaled the heights of haute couture". The Sunday Guardian stated that "The fashion world sees the end of an era with Valentino’s death." His legacy has endured beyond his passing, according to writer Prakriti Parul.

After his death, CNN noted his influential clientele and called him the "quintessential Italian gentleman". He was remembered for the designs he catered for Jacqueline Kennedy Onassis, Elizabeth Taylor, and Diana, Princess of Wales. Valentino's designs were considered to be "timeless" as he was credited for not embracing current trends by not showing skirts with shrinking hems and for designing clothes that responded to the political landscape of the time.
