= Jacques Sarazin =

French sculptor (1592–1660)

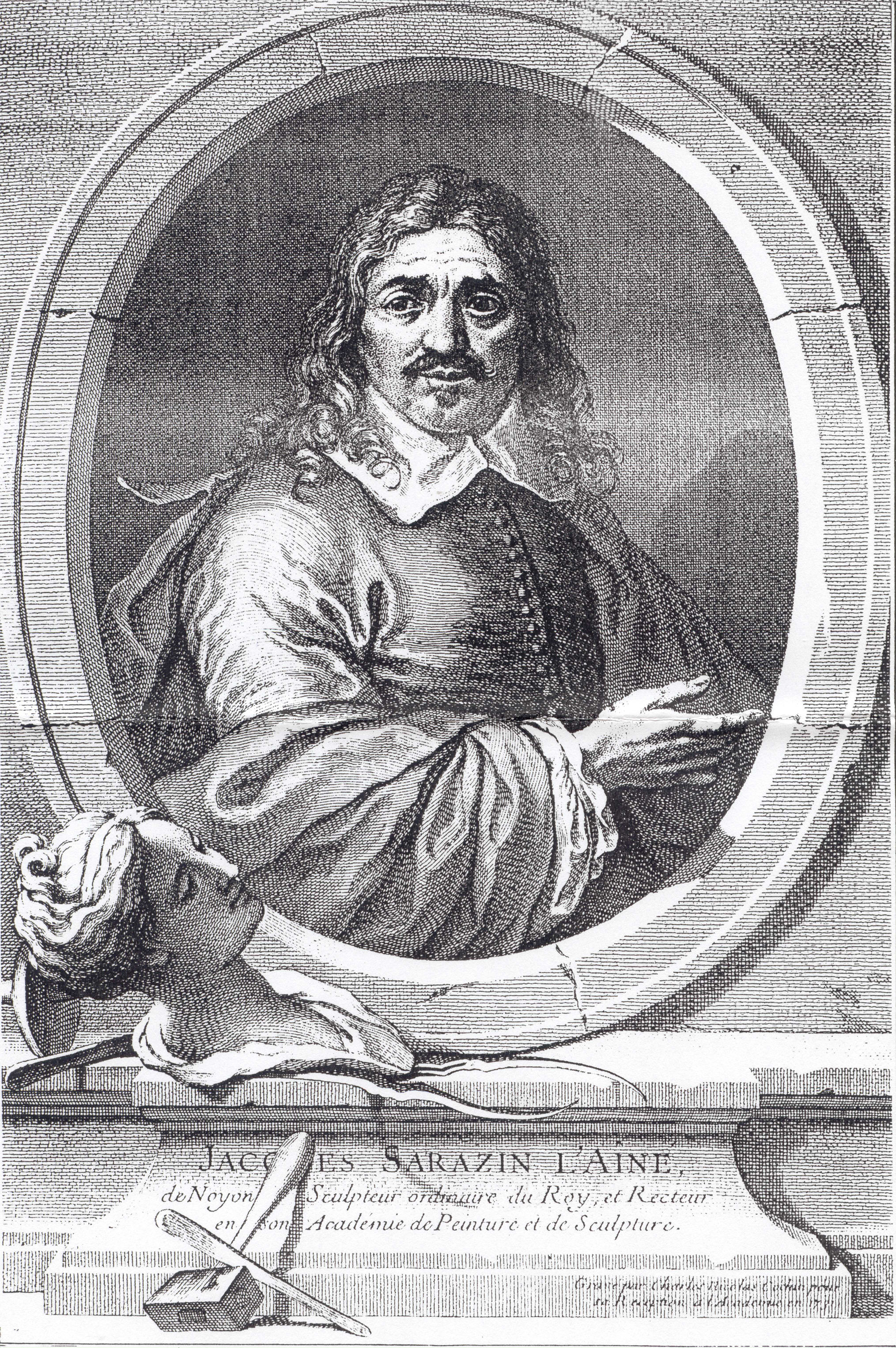
- Jacques Sarazin, by Charles-Nicolas Cochin, c. 1731.
- Born: 1592; Noyon
- Died: December 3, 1660 (aged 67–68); Paris
- Known for: Sculpture, painting
- Movement: Baroque, Style Louis XIV

Jacques Sarazin or Sarrazin (French pronunciation: [ʒak saʁazɛ̃]; baptised 8 June 1592 – died 3 December 1660 in Paris) was a French sculptor in the classical tradition of Baroque art. He was instrumental in the development of the Style Louis XIV through his own work as well as through his many pupils. Nearly all his work as a painter was destroyed and is only known through engravings.

== Life ==
Sarazin was born in Noyon, France, and went to Paris with his brother, where he trained in the workshop of Nicolas Guillain. He went to Rome in 1610 and remained there until 1628. While in Rome, he produced garden sculpture for Cardinal Aldobrandini's Villa Aldobrandini in Frascati (c. 1620). From 1622 to 1627, he carried out stucco work to accompany the paintings of Domenichino on the high altar of Sant'Andrea della Valle and in San Lorenzo in Miranda.

In 1628 he returned to Paris, where, in 1631, he married a niece of the painter Simon Vouet, whom he had met in Rome and for whom he had created some angels in stucco to frame his altarpiece in Saint-Nicolas-des-Champs, Paris.

Appointed Sculpteur et peintre ordinaire du roi in 1631, Sarazin made a number of works for Louis XIII and his wife Anne of Austria, particularly portraits and tomb sculpture, most of which were later destroyed.

Other royal works include the Caryatides of the Pavillon de l'Horloge, in the center of the west wing of the Cour Carrée (Square Court) of the Palais du Louvre. The history of the Caryatides illustrates well the collaborative system of royal sculpture during the period in which Sarazin worked. The facade had been designed by the royal architect, Jacques Lemercier, as an extension of the earlier facade across the courtyard made by Pierre Lescot. The Caryatides were inspired by six figures of the Caryatid Porch of the Erechtheion on the Acropolis at Athens. They had been drawn frequently by artists, and one had been brought to London. En 1550, Jean Goujon, the architect and sculptor at the Louvre under Henry II of France, had made a group of caryatides inside the Louvre, supporting the platform for musicians in the Hall of the Swiss Guards. Goujon, like Sarazin, never saw the originals in Greece; he worked only from drawings. Sarazin made his first drawings for the Louvre exterior figures in 1636, based on drawings of the originals and on the Goujon works, and then made terra cotta miniatures. The actual statues were then carried out in 1639-1640 by his assistants Gilles Guérin, Philippe de Buyster and Thibaut Poissant according to the master's models.

Sarazin used his large workshop for decoration campaigns for several châteaux in the Ile-de-France, including Château de Chilly (c. 1630-32, destroyed) for the Superintendent of Finances marquis d'Effiat, the Château de Wideville for Effiat's successor Claude de Bullion (after 1630, only fragments remain) and interior and exterior sculptures for the Château de Maisons (1642–50). His main assistants were Guérin, de Buyster, Gérard van Opstal and later Pierre Le Gros the Elder, all of whom in turn became prominent sculptors in the service of Louis XIV.

In 1648, Sarazin was one of the founders of the French Royal Academy of Painting and Sculpture and was elected as one of the original twelve elders in charge of its running. In 1654 he became its Rector.

Already in 1648, Sarazin received the commission for the large funeral monument for the heart of the prince de Condé for the Église Saint-Paul-Saint-Louis in Paris. Due to the troubles of the Fronde its making was long delayed. At the time of Sarazin's death in 1660, all its parts were finished but not assembled, which was accomplished until 1663 by his assistant Le Gros. The monument has later been moved to the Musée Condé in Chantilly where it was installed in a different form.

== Importance ==
Although Sarazin died before the large sculpture commissions for the Gardens of Versailles were properly underway, it is there that most of his influence can be felt. He had brought the classical early Baroque style of the Bolognese painters and the restrained playfulness of the sculpture of François Duquesnoy from Italy to France. There, he developed his vocabulary. His mythological statues of the 1630s for Wideville already display a stylistic approach which was to become typical for Versailles sculpture. Moreover, the playful ease of his putti at Maisons provide an example which was to be followed in French sculpture well beyond the 18th century.

== Gallery ==
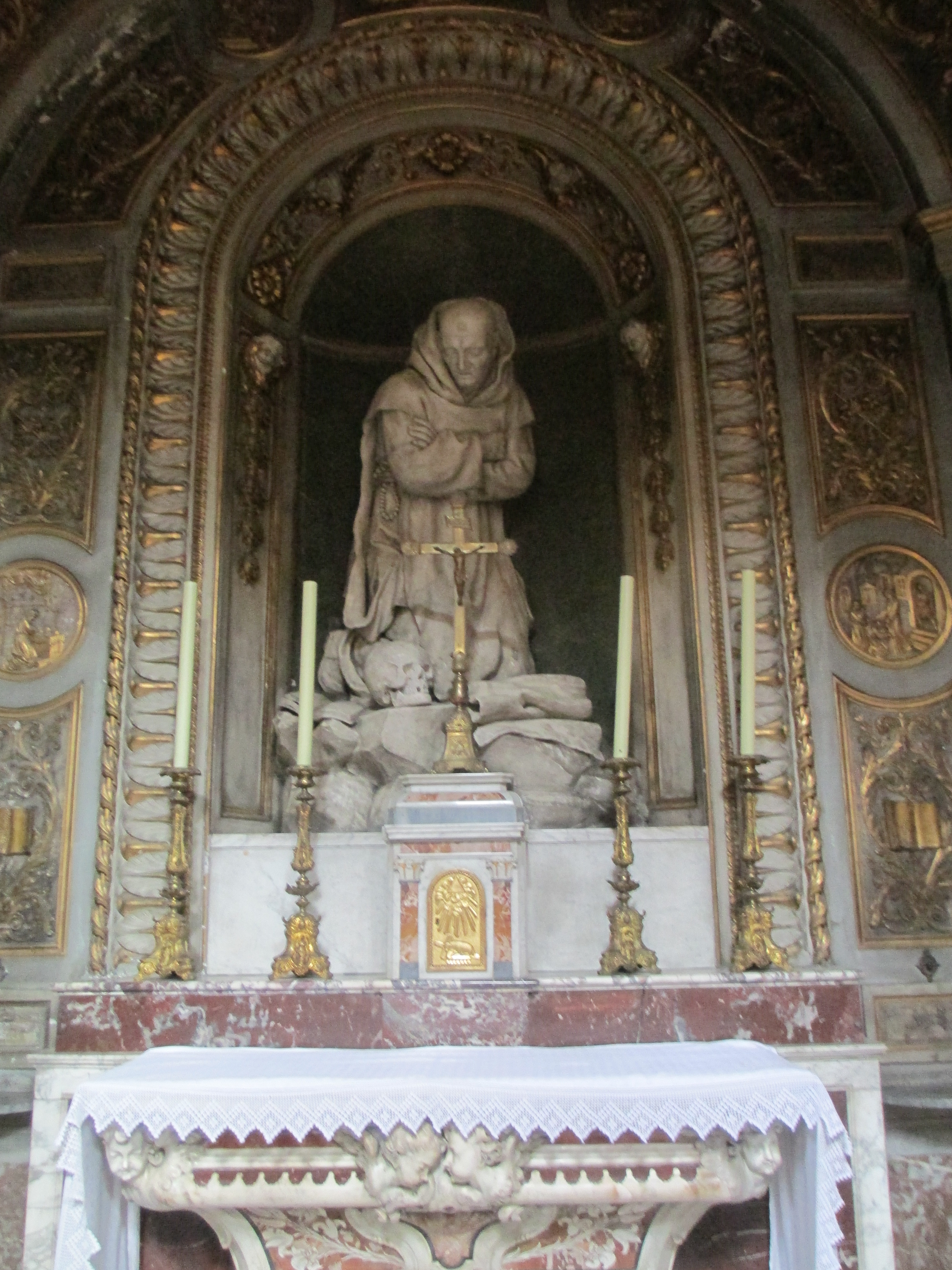
Saint Bruno, Church of St Bruno-les-Chartreux, Lyon (1629)

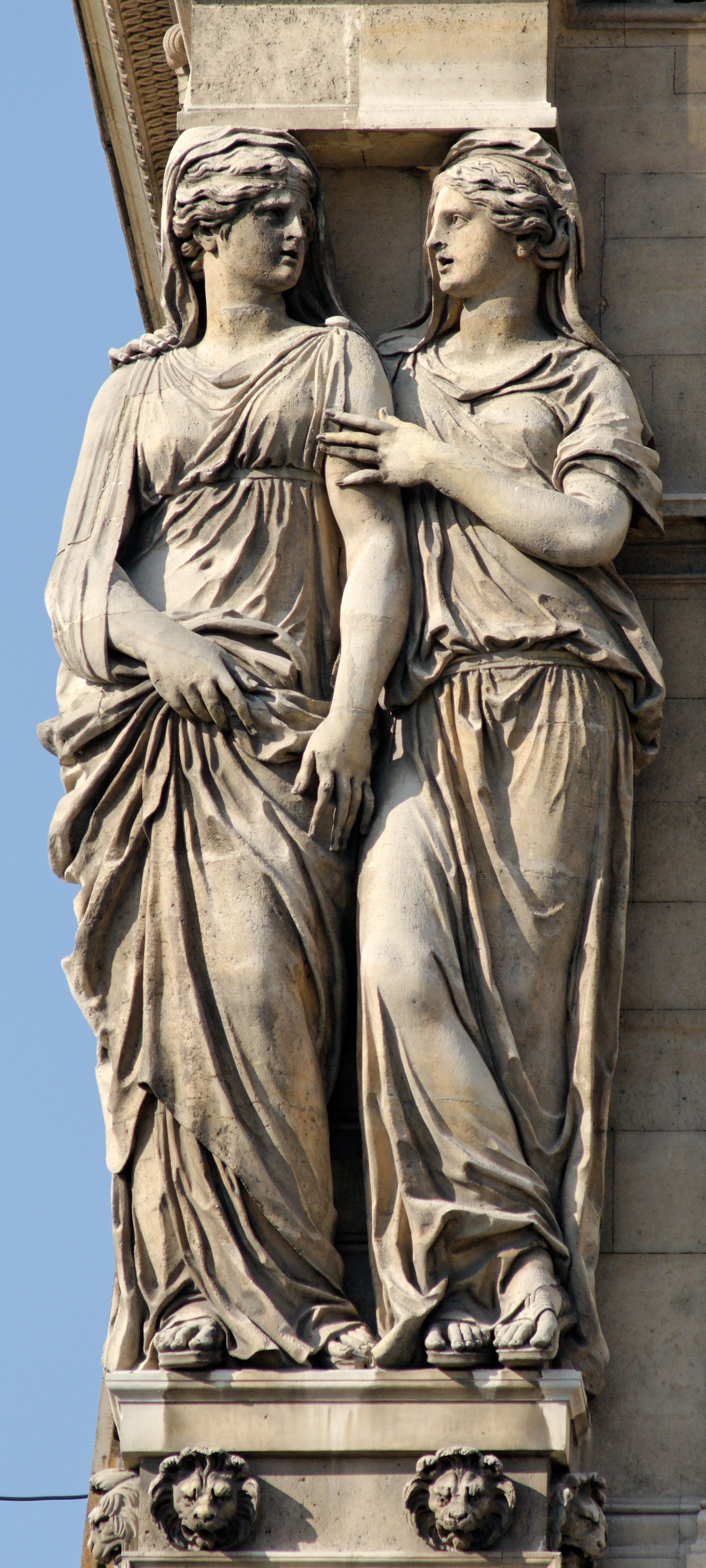
Double Carytides on the Pavillon de l'Horloge of the cour Carrée, Louvre Palace (1639–40)

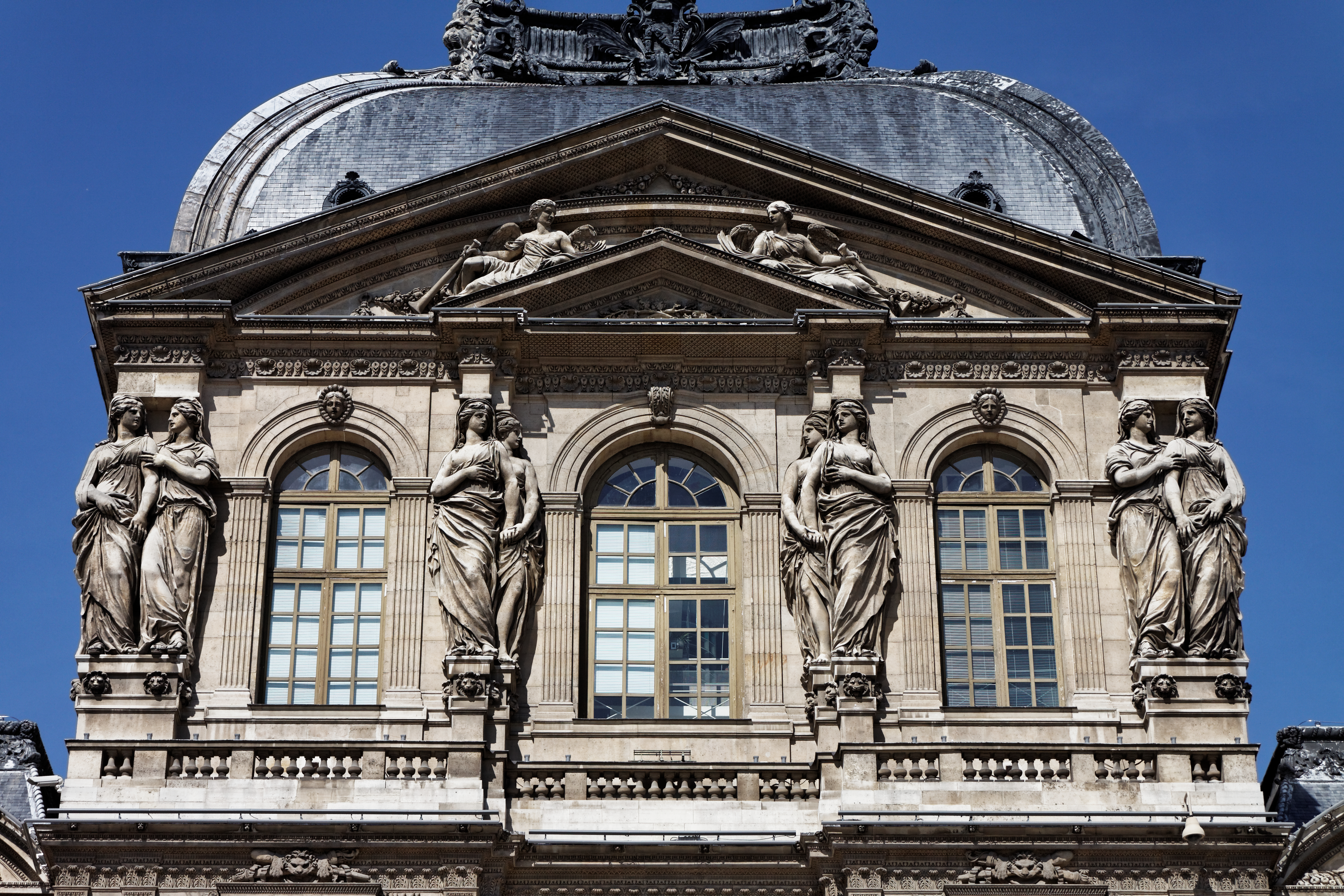
Caryatides on the Pavillon de l'Horloge, Louvre Palace (1639–40)

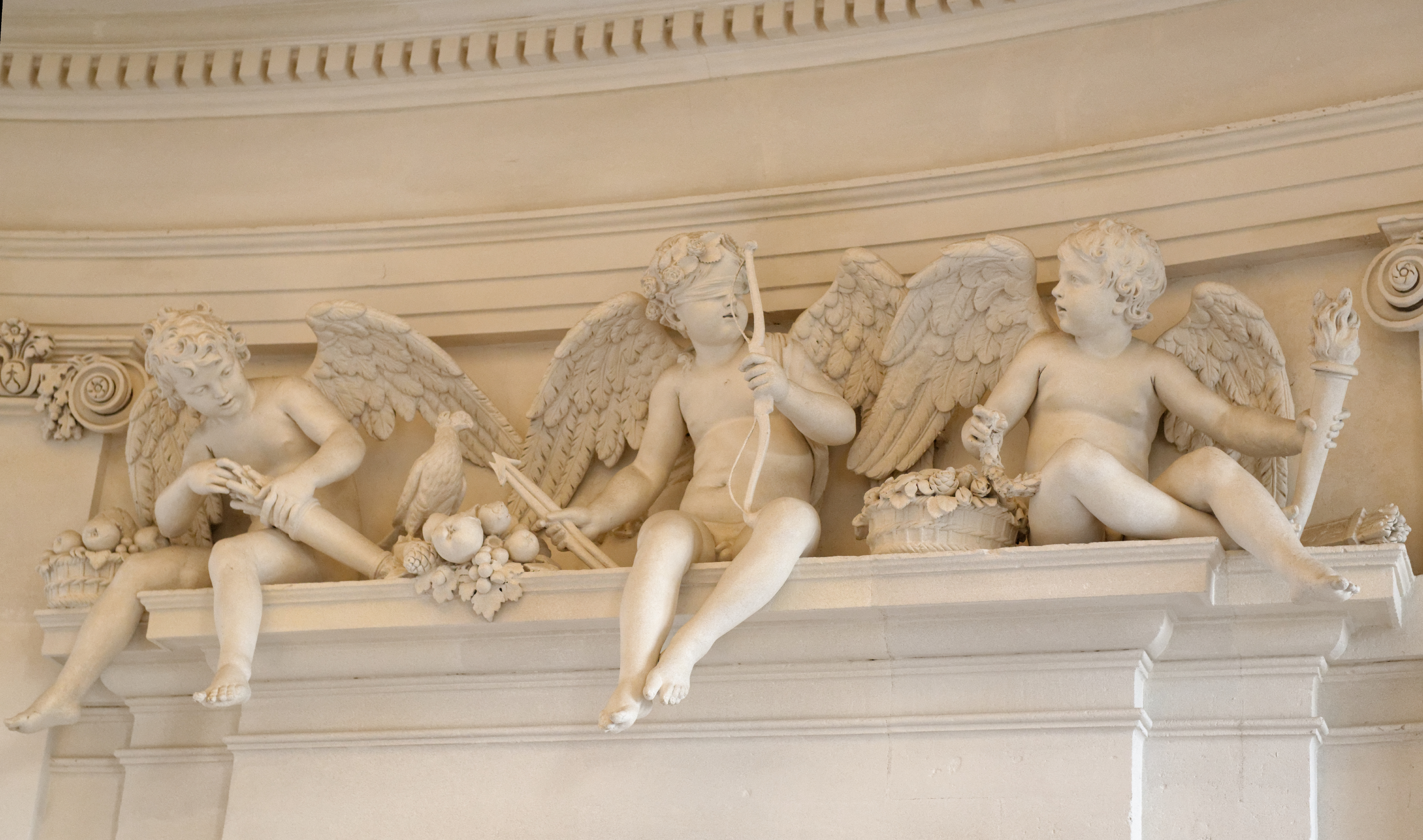
Putti on the Grand Stairway, Château de Maisons (c. 1642-1650)

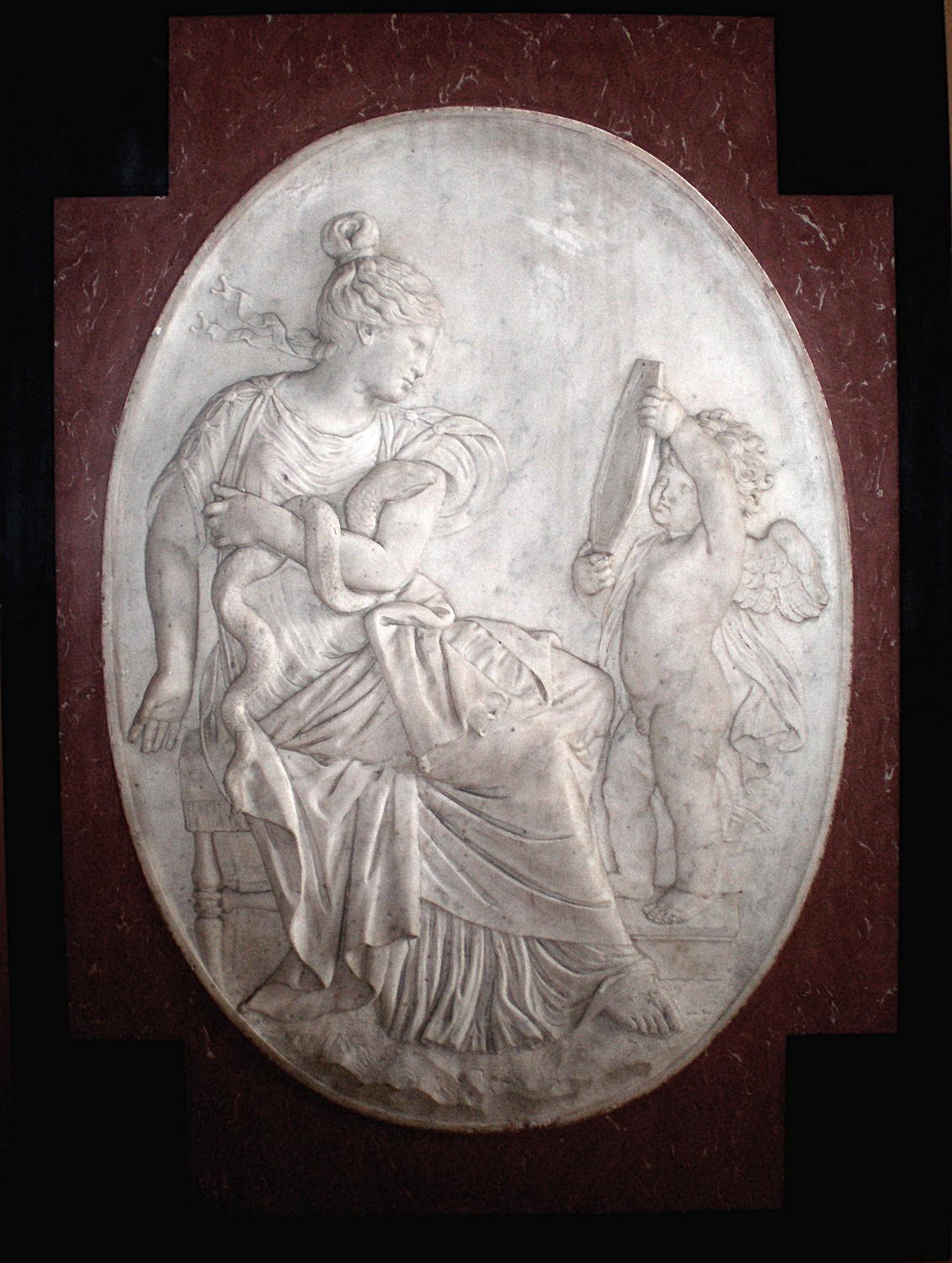
Plaque representing "Prudence" on the funeral monument holding the heart of Louis XIII, Louvre (1643)

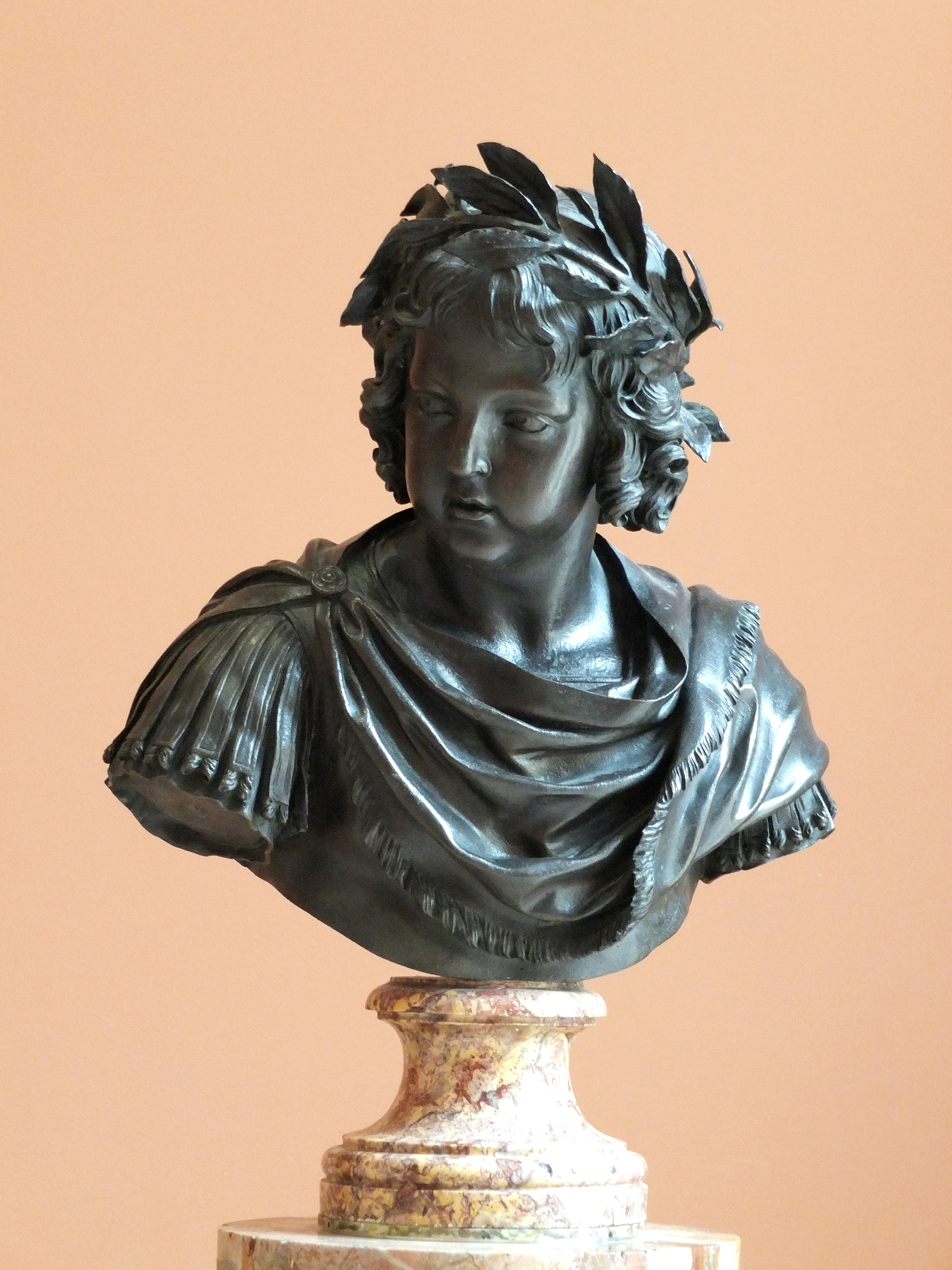
Louis XIV at age five (1643)

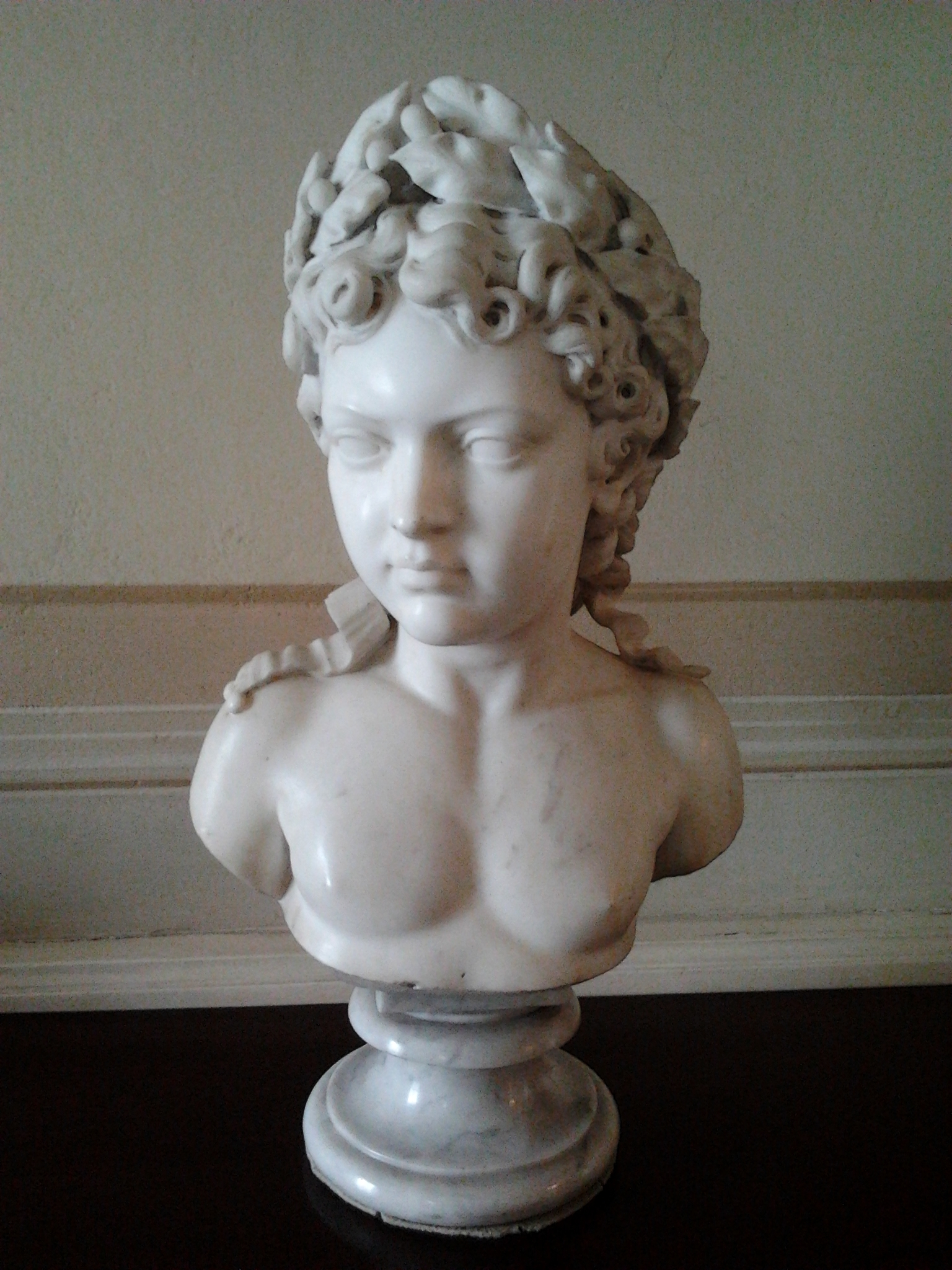
Louis XIV at age ten. (1648)

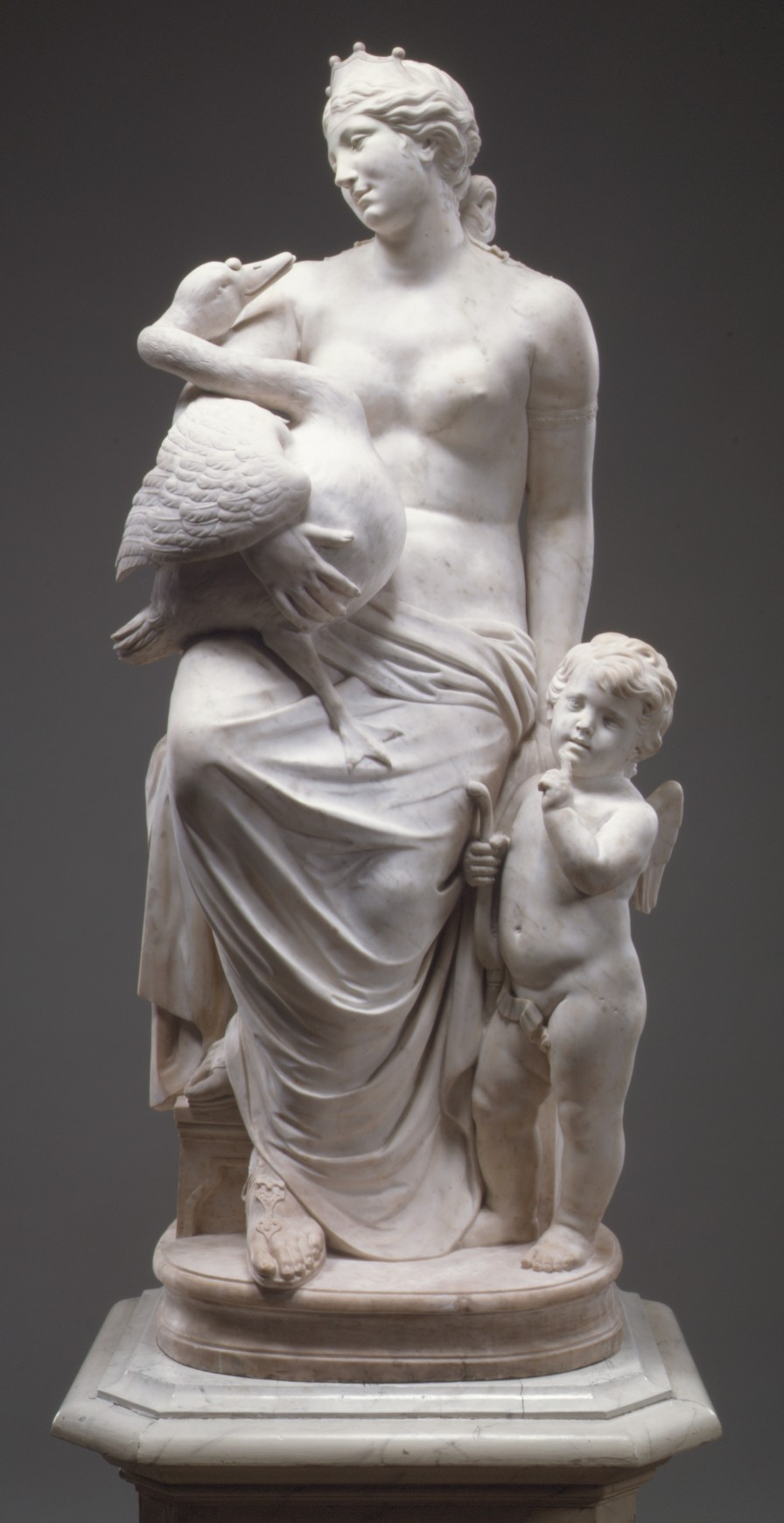
Leda and the Swan, New York, Metropolitan Museum (ca. 1650)

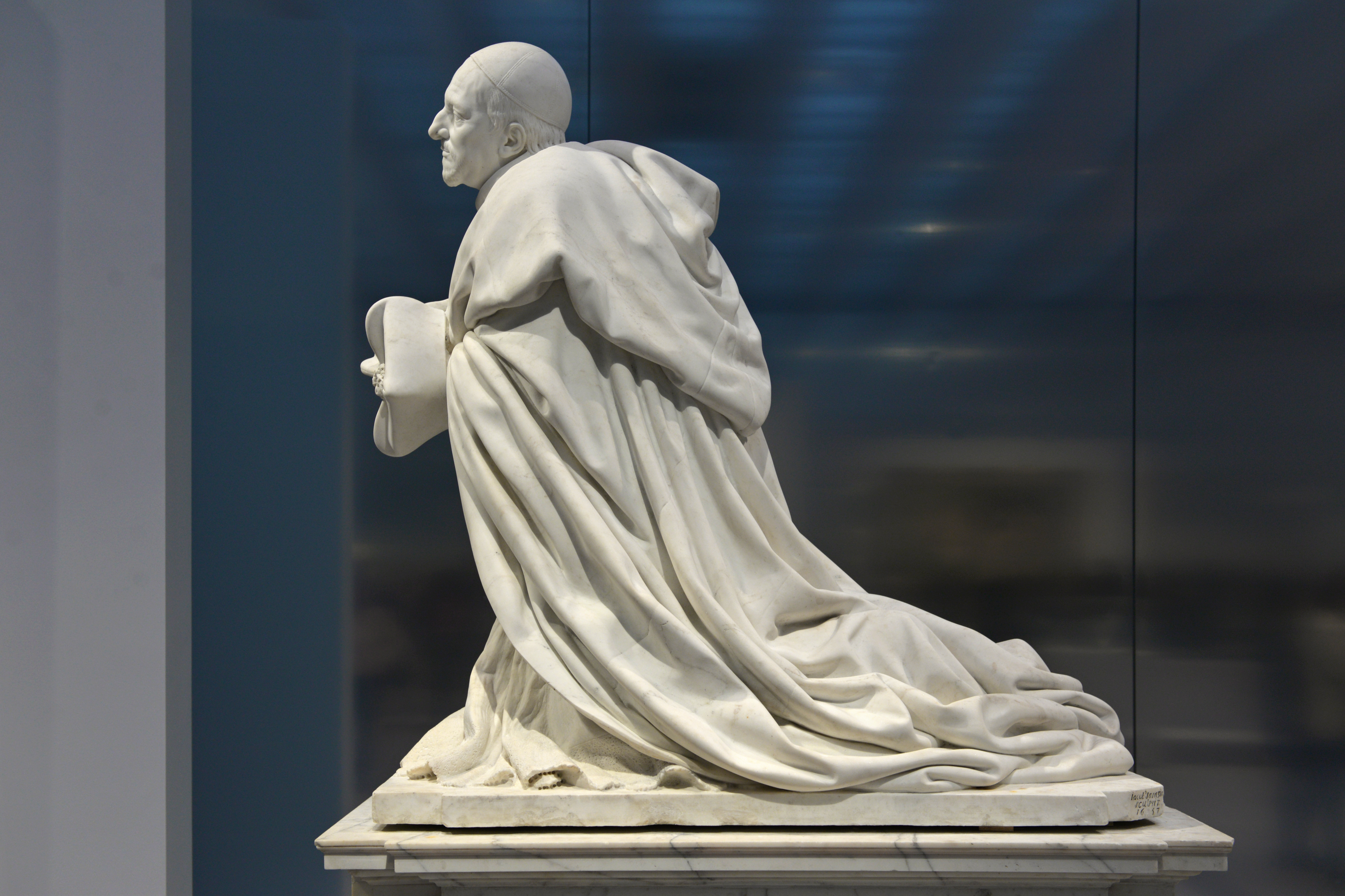
Monument for heart of cardinal Pierre de Bérulle, Louvre (1657)

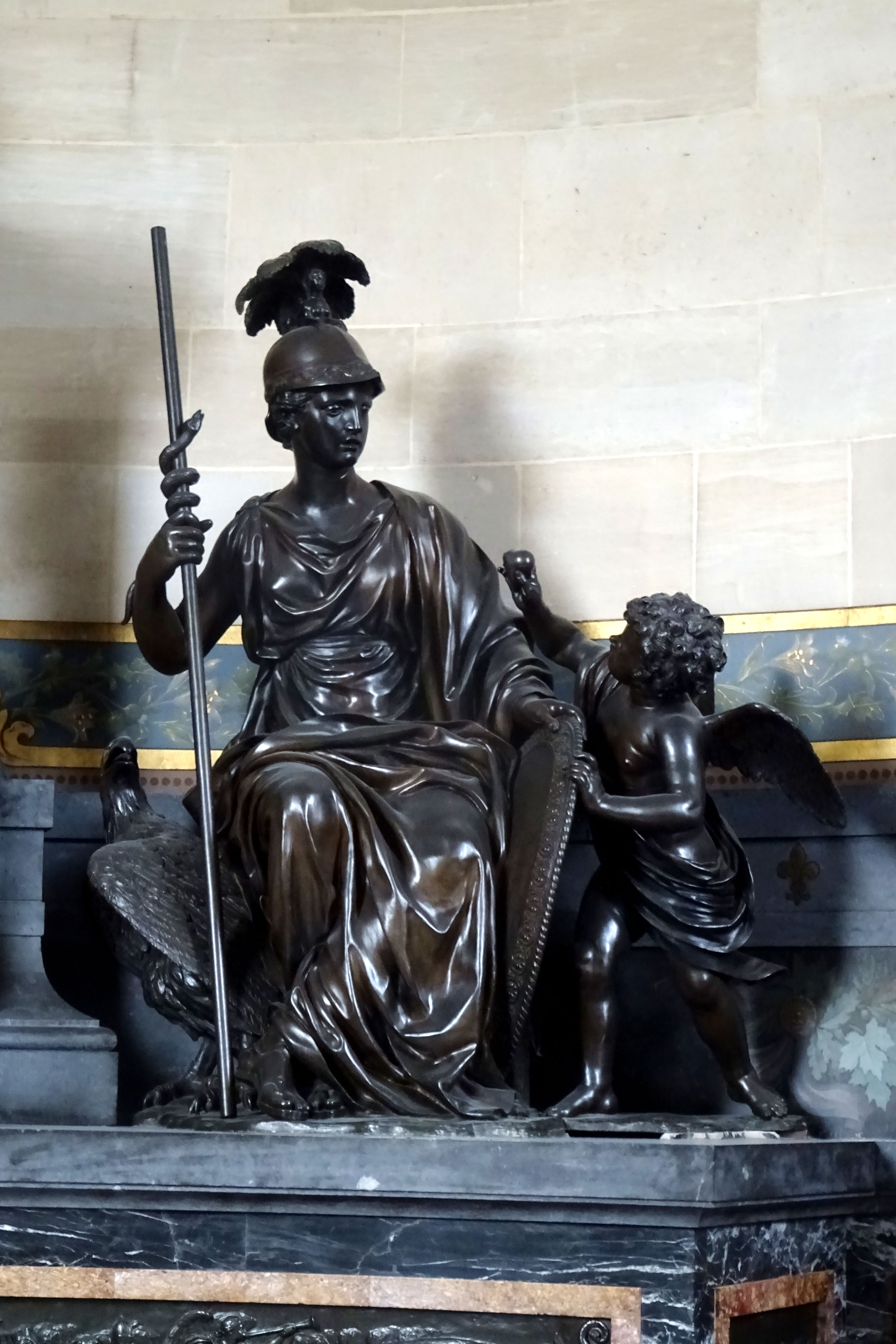
La Prudence from the monument to the Prince de Condé, Chantilly, Musée Condé (finished by 1660)

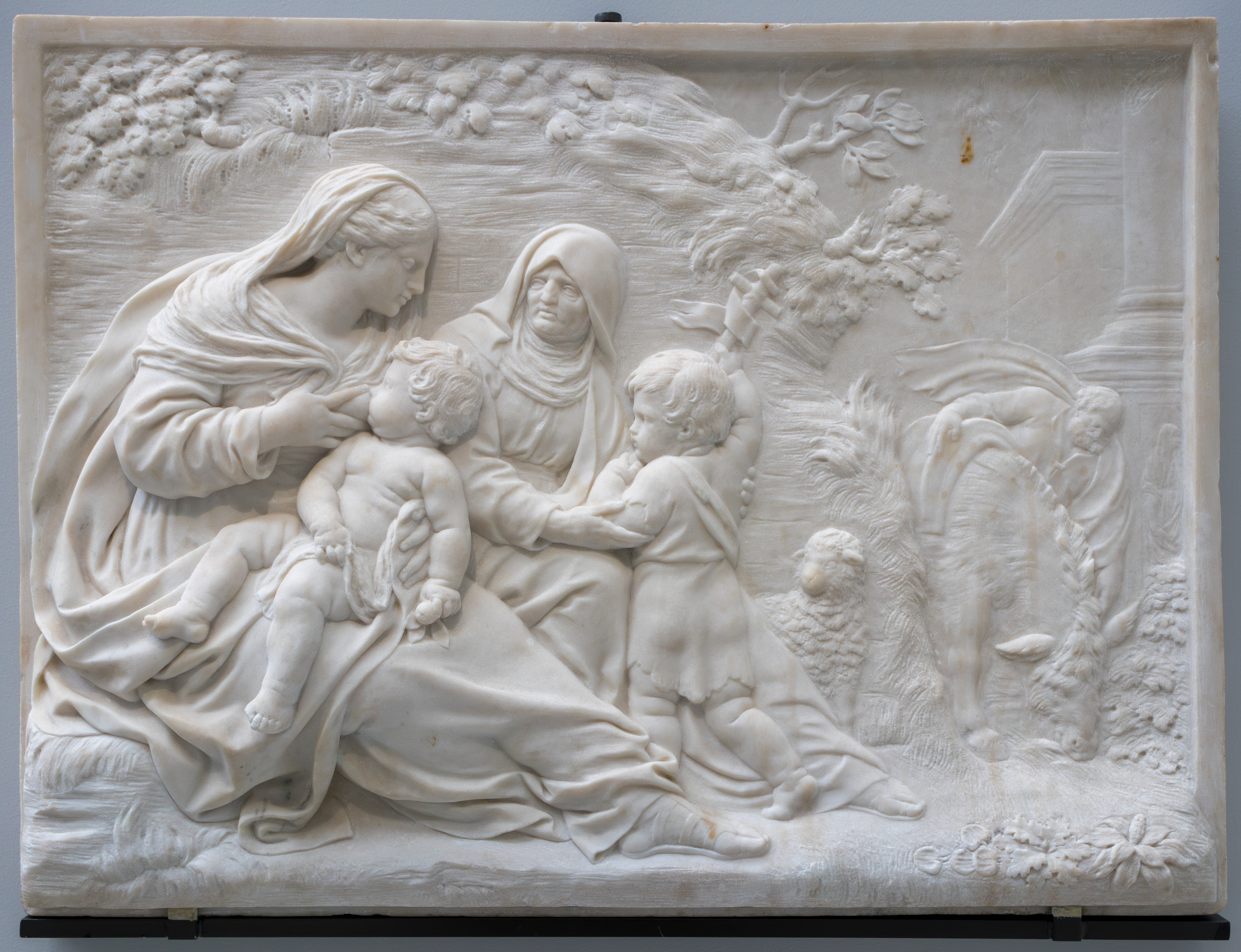
Holy Family, Louvre Museum

== Works in the Musée du Louvre, Paris ==
- Temperance, c. 1645, marble.
- Louis XIV enfant, c. 1643, sculpture
- Cenotaph to the heart of cardinal Pierre de Bérulle, 1657
