= Claude de Bullion =

French aristocrat and politician

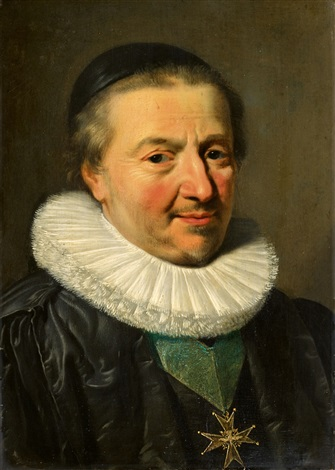
- Born: 13 October 1569
- Died: 22 December 1640 (aged 71); Paris
- Occupation: Politician

Claude de Bullion (13 October 1569 – 22 December 1640) was a French aristocrat and politician who served as a Minister of Finance under Louis XIII from 1632 to 1640. He was a close ally of Cardinal Richelieu.

== Life and career ==
He became a lawyer at the Parlement of Paris in 1594 and an advisor in 1595. In 1605, he became Maître des Requêtes, and in 1606 he joined the Parliament of Grenoble as State Councillor and Chairman.

In 1611 he bought the lordship of Bolt and later bought the lordship of Maule. In 1612, Seigneur de Bonnelles named him special ambassador to the Court of Turin. He bought Château de Wideville in 1620 and built the famous gardens and ponds there. His holdings became known as Bullion in 1621. He also possessed the lordships of Fervaques, Gallardon of Montlouet, Atilly, and Longchesne. In 1639, he bought Château d'Esclimont, and his was known as creator of Louis d'Or. He later built a hotel in Paris that contained two galleries.

In 1632 he became Minister of Finance under Louis XIII, concurrently with Claude Bouthillier. de Bullion was also named Lord Chancellor of The Order of the Holy Spirit from 1633 to 1636.

He was married to Angélique Faure in 1612. Their son Noël de Bullion succeeded his father as Lord Chancellor of The Order of the Holy Spirit. He died suddenly in Paris in 1640, leaving his wife to control his huge fortune. He was buried at night due to his unpopularity as Finance Minister. His tomb was destroyed during the French Revolution.
