= Château de Wideville =

Castle in Yvelines, France

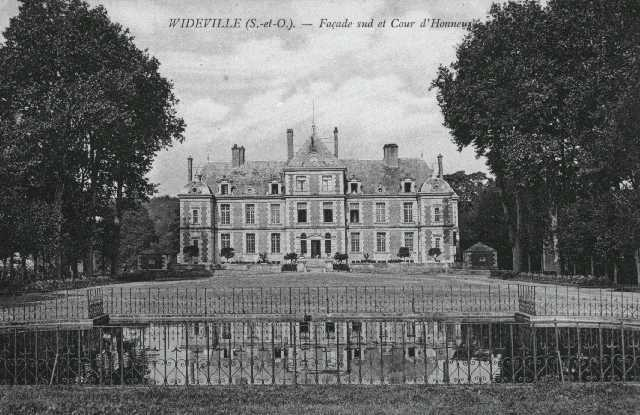
Château de Wideville

The Château de Wideville is located in the French commune of Crespières, in the Île de France region outside of Paris.

== History ==
Located about forty kilometers from Paris, near the town of Crespières in the Yvelines region, the château was built around 1580 by Benoît Milon, in the Louis XIII style, and later renovated in 1620 by Claude de Bullion. The name Wideville may derive from Hugues de Guideville, an officer of William the Conqueror, whose name in the 14th century lost the "G" to become Uideville and then Videville. The name Wideville also exists in Great Britain.

In 1579, the property was sold by the heirs of Pierre Picquet, treasurer of the Queen of Navarre, to Benoît Milon, the first intendant of finances of Henry III. Milon built the castle on a previous palace between 1580 and 1584, according to the principles of the "maisons des champs" of Jacques Androuet du Cerceau. It was renovated in 1620 by Claude de Bullion, superintendent of finances of Louis XIII, who had the gardens redesigned and the palace enriched with decorations. Half a century later, Noël de Bullion built the dovecote.

In 1870, the castle became the property of the Count of Galard, who restored it without any modification to the main structure. Among its famous owners were Jean-Charles de Crussol, Duke of Uzès, the Duchess of Chatillon, and Louis VI Bonabes Victurnien Alexis, Marquis de Rouge.

In 1995, the entire property was purchased by the renowned Italian fashion designer Valentino, who made it his residence. He hired the interior designer Henri Samuel to redesign every room.
