= Benny Ziffer =

Israeli author

- בני ציפר
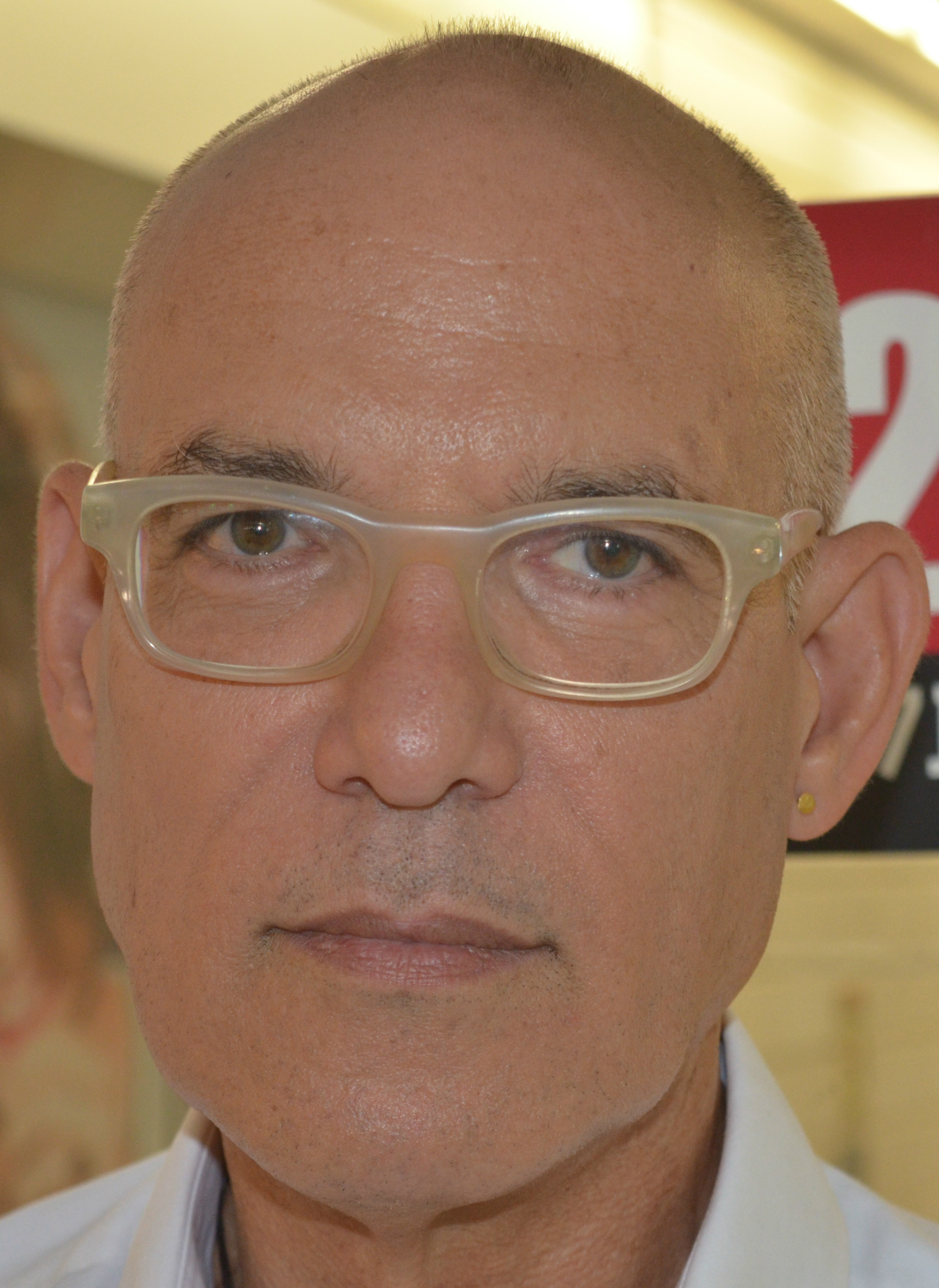
- Born: January 21, 1953 (age 73); Tel Aviv
- Occupations: Israeli author and journalist
- Spouse: Irit Ziffer
- Children: 3

Benny Ziffer (Hebrew: בני ציפר; born 21 January 1953) is an Israeli author and journalist.

== Biography ==
Benjamin (Benny) Ziffer was born in Tel Aviv. His parents, Heinz and Nira (née Farhi), immigrated to Israel from Turkey in 1949. In 1895, his grandfather, Albert (Avraham) Ziffer, founded the world's first Jewish sports team in Istanbul. Ziffer studied French literature and political science. He is married to the curator Irit Ziffer, and they have three children. Ziffer holds two nationalities: Israeli and Turkish.

== Journalism career ==
In 1988, Ziffer was appointed literary editor of Haaretz daily newspaper. Ziffer is the author of three novels. He has also translated French novels and poetry into Hebrew. Ziffer writes a political-cultural column in Haaretz that combines television reviews with reflections on contemporary Israeli life.

== Views and opinions ==
Some of his columns are considered controversial; in 2015, Ziffer wrote that "not recognizing the Armenian genocide is a triumph for common sense", adding "There are still a few responsible adults around who haven't surrendered to the self-righteous kitsch of national victimization".

In August 2019, returning from a condolence visit to the Israeli settlement Ofra in the West Bank, Ziffer wrote on his Facebook page: “En route I looked at the Palestinian villages alongside the Jewish communities, and I thought of how for the Palestinians murder is a type of sport or enjoyment, perhaps a substitute for erotica. From that perspective we will never have anything culturally in common with them. ... Regarding this evil and undignified people living among us, we can only yearn for the land to vomit it out, because it isn’t worthy of this land, which is full of Jewish blood that it has spilled.”

== Awards and recognition ==
In 2010, Ziffer was awarded the Outstanding Contribution to New Media prize by the International Council for Press and Broadcasting at the International Media Awards in London

== Published works ==
- A Bird Nests at Home (Tsipor Mekanenet Ba-bait) (1978) - poetry
- Turkish March (Hebrew for 'Alla Turca')(1995)
- Ziffer and his Kind (1999)
- The Literary Editor's Progress (2005)
