= Irit Ziffer =

Israeli archaeologist and art historian

Irit Ziffer (Hebrew: עירית ציפר; born 1954) is an Israeli archaeologist and art historian.

Irit Margit Ziffer was born in Tel Aviv. She is the curator of the Ceramics and Copper (Hebrew: Nehushtán) pavilions of the Eretz Israel Museum in Tel Aviv.

Her field of expertise is symbols and their meanings in ancient art, especially the way they were used by political powers.

She is married to the journalist Benny Ziffer.
