= Tommaso Ziffer =

Italian architect and interior designer

Tommaso Ziffer is an Italian architect and interior designer. Ziffer designed The Accademia Valentino and in 2000 as well as Rome's most successful hotel, Rocco Forte's Hotel de Russie. Ziffer has also designed several private residential projects.

He has also designed the interior of Casa Howard, a well-known guest house in Rome and in 2006 the interior design of Hotel de Rome in Berlin, Germany, again for Rocco Forte Hotel chain. Ziffer has recently been appointed for the Interior Design Project of the total restoration of the well-known Roman "Hotel de la Ville" a 5 star luxury Hotel project that will be managed once again from Rocco Forte Hotel Group and financed by Reale Immobili, a branch of the Reale Mutua Insurance Company. At the same time he was also appointed for the Interiors of a new wing of the Locanda Rossa Resort in Capalbio, Tuscany, that was completed in the spring of 2018.

Ziffer, completed in 2019 the total refurbishment of the Hotel de la Ville, second property of Rocco Forte Hotel in Rome and immediately after the Rocco Forte House apartments in Via del Babuino the third property of the same company in the Eternal City.
