= Henri Samuel =

20th century French interior designer

- Born: 1904; France
- Died: 1996 (aged 91–92)
- Occupation: Interior decorator
- Years active: 1921-1987
- Known for: Interior decoration

Henri Samuel (French pronunciation: [ɑ̃ʁi samɥɛl]; 1904–1996) was one of the foremost French interior designers of the twentieth century, hailed by Architectural Digest as a "supreme master of progressive historicism". He was a leading interpreter of le Goût Rothschild after the Second World War and helped restore Château de Ferrières and Château Lafite in the 1950s. His clients included several members of the Rothschild family, the fashion designer Valentino, and the prominent collector Jayne Wrightsman.

== Early life ==
Samuel was born into a wealthy family: his father was a banker and his grandfather was an antique dealer. After a 2 year apprenticeship on Wall Street he decided to pursue design and in 1925 went to work for design firm, Maison Jansen, where he assisted Stéphane Boudin.

== Career ==
Samuel worked for Jansen until he was hired by the firm Alavoine, one of Jansen's main competitors. He started his own firm in 1970.
