= Menier =

Menier may refer to:

== Places ==
- Port-Menier, Quebec, a small fishing town located in Anticosti Island, Quebec, Canada
- Port-Menier Airport, (IATA: YPN, ICAO: CYPN), located 2.7 nmi (5.0 km; 3.1 mi) east of Port-Menier, Quebec, Canada

== Chocolate ==
- Menier Chocolate, a French chocolate manufacturing business founded in 1816
- Menier family of Noisiel, France, was a prominent family of chocolatiers who began as pharmaceutical manufacturers in Paris in 1816
- Émile-Justin Menier (1826–1881), French pharmaceutical manufacturer, chocolatier, and politician
- Antoine Brutus Menier (1795–1853), French entrepreneur and founder of the Menier family of chocolatiers
- Antoine Gilles Menier (1904–1967), French businessman and municipal politician, member of the Menier family of chocolatiers
- Henri Menier (1853–1913), French businessman and adventurer, member of the Menier family of chocolatiers
- Menier Chocolate Factory, a 180-seat fringe studio theatre, restaurant and gallery in a former 1870s Menier Chocolate Company factory in Southwark, London

== See also ==
- Meunier
- Minier
- Munier
- Mounier
