= Meunier (disambiguation) =

Meunier is a French surname meaning "miller".

Meunier may also refer to:

- Pinot Meunier, aka Meunier; a variety of wine grape
- Meunier rifle, WWI French battle rifle
- Mount Meunier, Kohler Range, Antarctica
- Meunier Museum, Brussels, Belgium; named after sculptor Constance Meunier

== See also ==
- Menier (disambiguation)
- Minier (surname)
- Mounier (surname)
- Munier (surname)
