= Menucourt =

- Commune
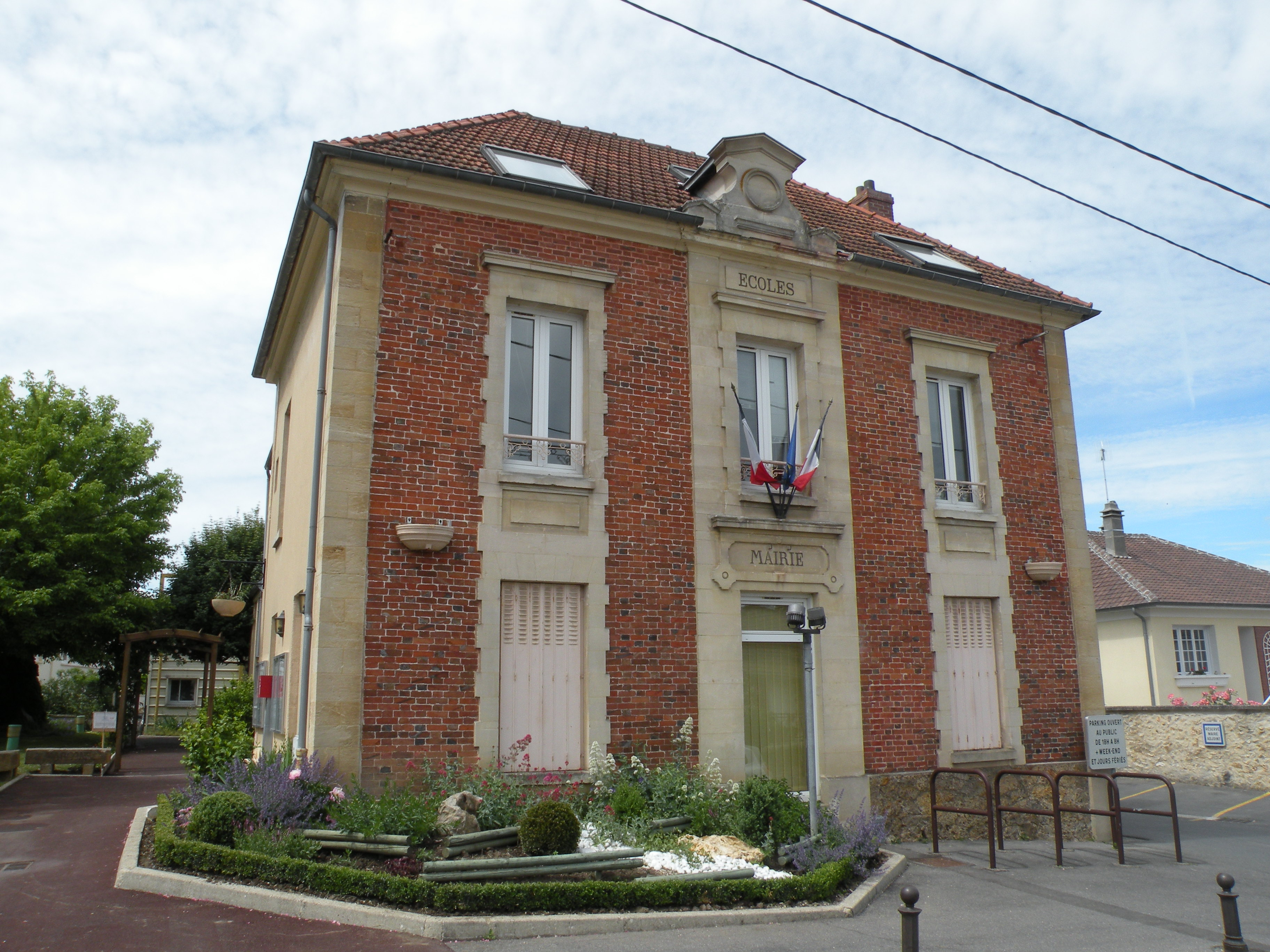
- The town hall of Menucourt

- Coat of arms
- Location of Menucourt
- Location within France Location within Île-de-France (region)
- Coordinates: 49°01′40″N 1°58′55″E
- Country: France
- Region: Île-de-France
- Department: Val-d'Oise
- Arrondissement: Pontoise
- Canton: Vauréal
- Intercommunality: Cergy-Pontoise

Government
  - Mayor (2020–2026): Eric Proffit-Brulfert
- Area^{1}: 3.68 km^{2} (1.42 sq mi)
- Highest elevation: 188 m (617 ft)
- Lowest elevation: 85 m (279 ft)
- Population (2023): 6,184
  - Density: 1,680/km^{2} (4,350/sq mi)
- Time zone: UTC+01:00 (CET)
  - Summer (DST): UTC+02:00 (CEST)
- INSEE/Postal code: 95388 /95180
- ^{1} French Land Register data, which excludes lakes, ponds, glaciers > 1 km^{2} (0.386 sq mi or 247 acres) and river estuaries.

Menucourt (French pronunciation: [mənykuʁ]) is a commune in the Val-d'Oise department in Île-de-France in northern France.

== Population ==
Historical population
Year	Pop.	±% p.a.
1968	726	—
1975	4,082	+27.98%
1982	4,666	+1.93%
1990	4,592	−0.20%
1999	5,084	+1.14%
2007	5,167	+0.20%
2012	5,332	+0.63%
2017	5,771	+1.59%
2023	6,184	+1.16%
Source: INSEE

== Education ==
Schools include:

- Preschools: École maternelle des Cornouillers and École maternelle de la Vallée Basset
- Elementary schools: École des Cornouillers, École de la Vallée Basset, and École Louis Bourgeois
- One junior high school, Collège la taillette

High school students may attend Lycée Camille Claudel in Vauréal.

== See also ==
- Communes of the Val-d'Oise department
