= Pascal Lecocq =

French painter and set designer

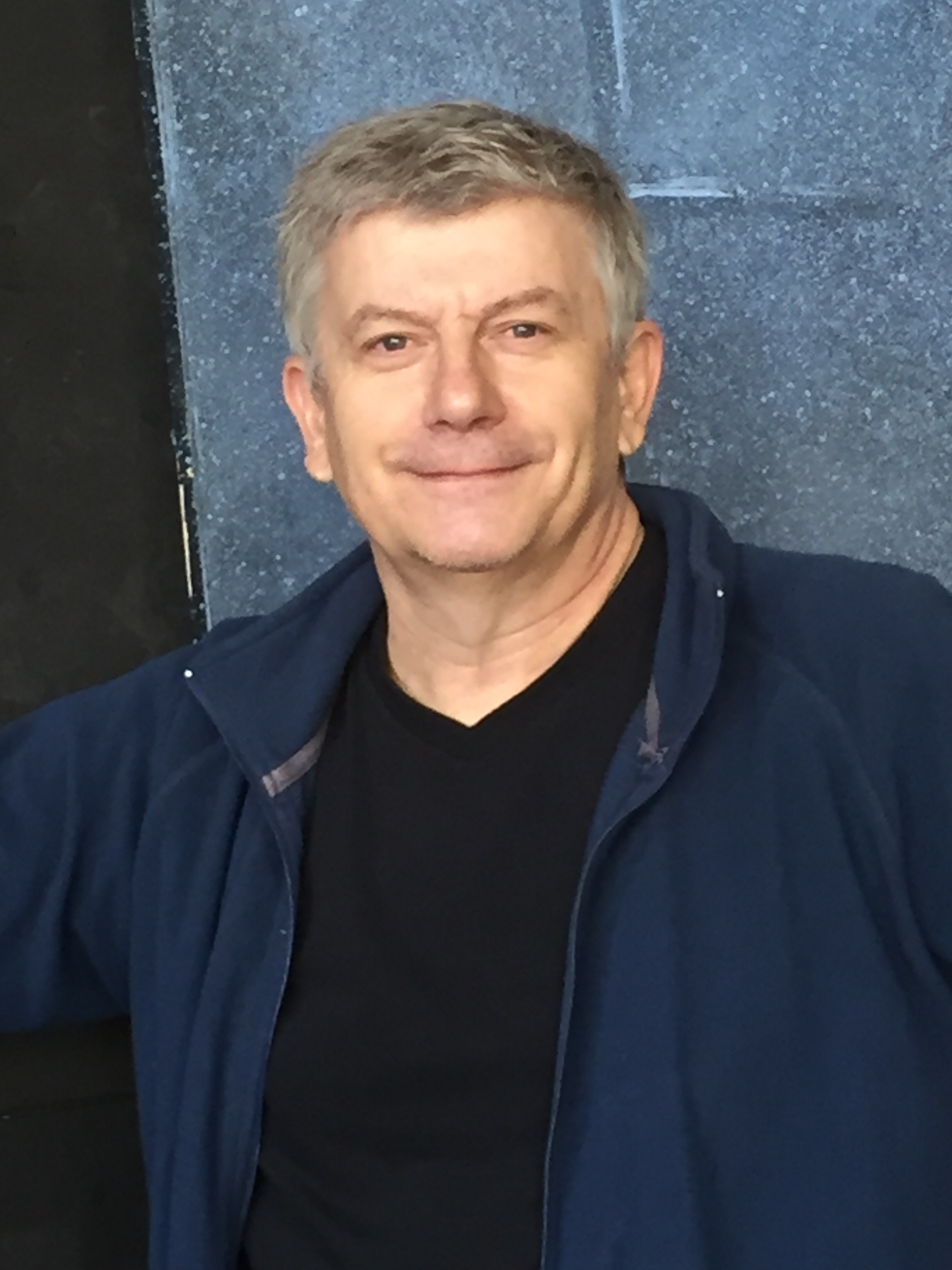
- Pascal Lecocq at the Opera of Nice (France) during the setting of the Magic Flute, in 2016
- Born: 4 June 1958 (age 68); Fontainebleau
- Education: Ph.D of Arts, University of Paris VIII (1985)
- Known for: Fine art painting, set design, costumes design

Pascal Lecocq (born 4 June 1958) is a French painter and set designer. He is the Painter of Blue who paints on high backcloths of sky or deep sea, as a stage director, figures, horses, divers, allegories, architectures, Venice, and ancient ruins, between hyperrealism and surrealism with a whimsical sense of humor. He is the author of the diving world renowned picture: The Matador.

== Biography ==
Pascal Lecocq was born in Fontainebleau, France, on 4 June 1958. Pascal attended, while in high school, Ecole Comairas art school, from the Fondation Taylor, in Fontainebleau, from 1973 to 1977, as a pupil of Yvonne Bouisset Mignon (daughter of the painter Abel Mignon (1861-1936) who studied with Jean-Léon Gérôme; spouse of the painter Jacques Bouisset (1888-1977), the son of the famous author of the poster Chocolat Meunier Firmin Bouisset (1859-1925). His first solo exhibition took place in Fontainebleau in January 1977. He then obtained a PhD degree of Arts at the University of Paris VIII in 1985 under the direction of Prof. Frank Popper. Pascal Lecocq moved to Normandy in 1982, and opened his own art gallery in Honfleur (1989-2000); after a first exhibition at the DEMA show in Anaheim, CA, in 1998, he has been invited to show his artwork in the United States where he moved in 2003, becoming then a US resident.

== Stage design ==
Pascal Lecocq's dissertation for the Doctorate was a philosophical study of the interrelation between all the arts, focusing in the set design in opera, making a historical study specific to the Wandeldekoration, spectacular moving scenery of Parsifal, by Richard Wagner, from 1882 to 1982. Then, Pascal Lecocq worked as a director assistant, and set and costume designer in different opera houses in France (from 1985 to 1996: Lohengrin, Der Ring, Parsifal, Tosca, Traviata …and in 2016 at the Opera de Nice The Magic Flute directed by Numa Sadoul). He also directed Der Freischütz, by Carl Maria von Weber in Opéra Royal de Wallonie in Liège, Belgium, in 1991.

== Underwater art ==
While working on The Flying Dutchman, opera by R.Wagner, at the Théâtre d’Angers, France, in 1986, he got the idea for his first painting with divers. In 1993, he painted Corrida, The Matador while working about the opera Carmen with his famous bullfighter by Bizet, before being introduced to dive shows and becoming an icon in the world diving industry.
His artwork, oil on canvas in the traditional technique of Van Eyck, Vermeer, and Salvador Dalí, has been displayed in more than 250 solo exhibitions around the world, and featured in many art books about Parsifal, Arnold Böcklin, Marcel Proust or horses, and as front cover and portfolios for more than 20 magazines. The exhibition Shark ! at the Museum of Art Fort Lauderdale, Florida (May 2012-January 2013), curated by Richard Ellis (biologist), presented two paintings by Pascal Lecocq, including the Matador.

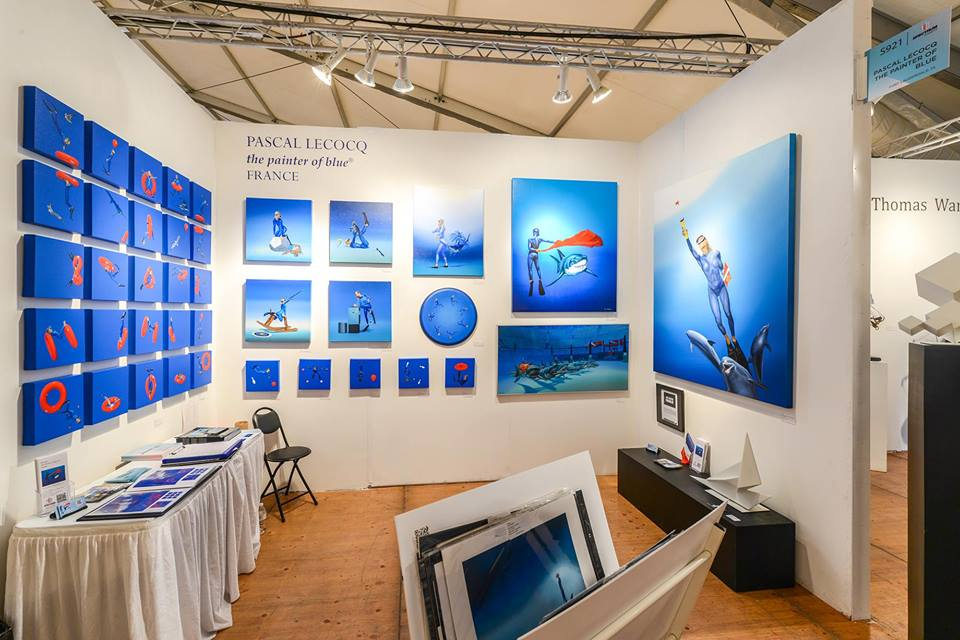
Pascal Lecocq at ArtBasel Miami 2015, Spectrum show.

Pascal Lecocq has been a member of the Ocean Artists Society (2003-2013), a contributor to many environmental organizations, an active advocate for the sharks, and for the education of arts, making workshops with children.

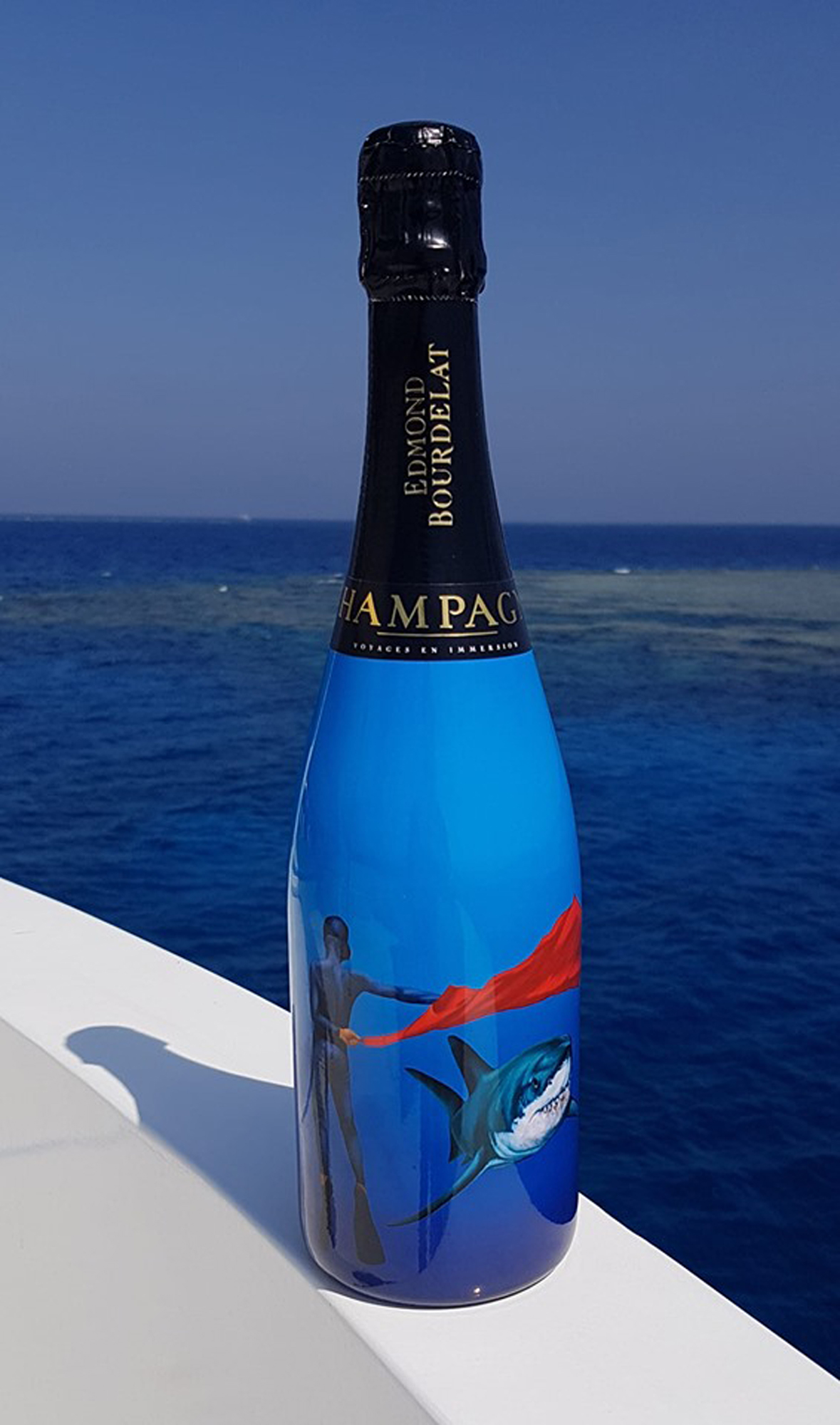
Champagne bottle sleeve with Pascal Lecocq signature painting (2019)

Pascal Lecocq collaborates with Champagne Edmond Bourdelat, France, creating exclusive collector bottle caps since 2015 (6 each year). Two bottles were wrapped with one commission painting (2013), while another featured his iconic piece, "The Matador", (2019).

Since 2016, Australian based World Underwater magazine Ocean Geographic holds the "Ocean Geographic Pictures Of The Year Awards", named in honour of, and judged by some of the most celebrated image-makers of the ocean, including the "Creative Vision – the Dr Pascal Lecocq Award for Outstanding Achievement". Pascal is also a worldwide awards recipient.

He is the author of more than 100 magazine articles or lectures about painting, the technique of the old masters, anatomy in art, set design... He contributed to the exhibition Homage to Böcklin’s Isle of the Dead (2001-2), at the Musée Bossuet of Meaux, France, as a featured painter and as the webmaster of the site dedicated to the Isle of the Dead.
