= Lycée Camille Claudel =

Lycée Camille Claudel may refer to:

Schools in the Paris area:

- Lycée Camille Claudel - Mantes-la-Ville
- Lycée Camille Claudel - Palaiseau
- Lycée Camille Claudel - Vauréal
- Lycée Camille-Claudel - Vitry-sur-Seine
- Lycée Camille Claudel - Pontault-Combault

Schools outside of the Paris area:

- Lycée professionnel Camille Claudel - Caen
- Lycée Camille Claudel - Digoin
- Lycée professionnel Camille Claudel - Lyon
- Lycée professionnel Camille Claudel - Remiremont
- Lycée Camille Claudel - Troyes
