= Pascal Meunier =

Pascal Meunier may refer to:

- Pascal Meunier (photographer)
- Pascal Meunier (diplomat)
