= Maunier =

Maunier is a French surname. Notable people with the surname include:

- Jean-Baptiste Maunier (born 1990), French actor and singer
- Richard Maunier (born 1977), French athlete

== See also ==
- Meunier
