= Gaston Menier =

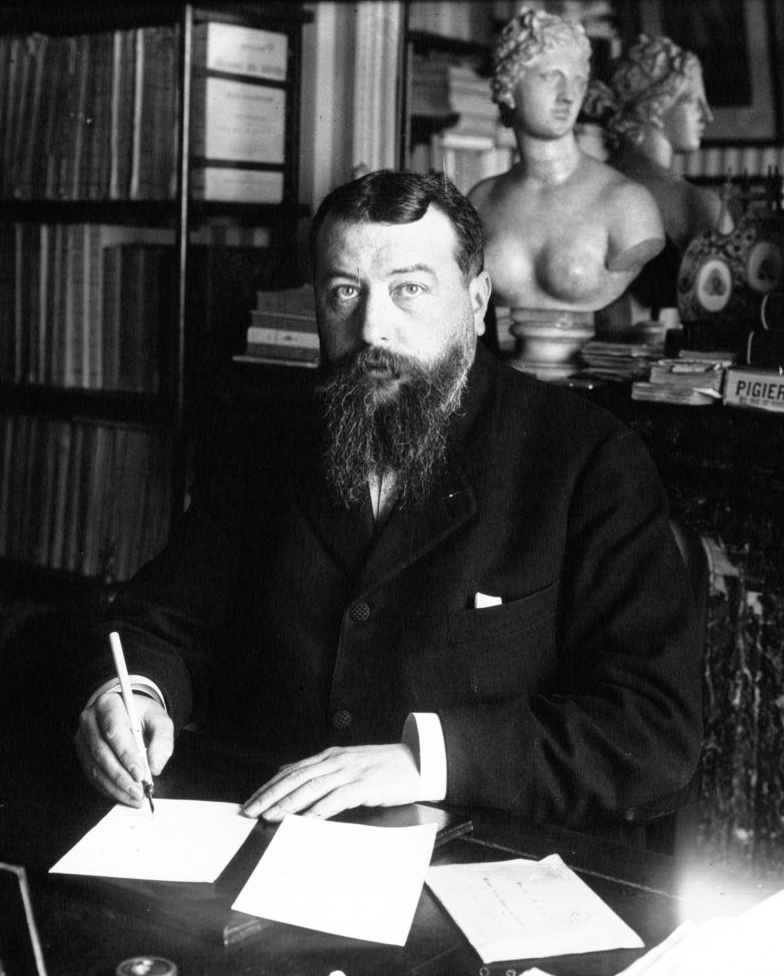
Menier in 1910.

Gaston Émile André Menier (22 May 1855 - 5 November 1934) was a French politician and industrialist.

== Life ==
He was born in Paris to Émile-Justin Menier and Claire Henriette Gérard. He inherited his father's industrial empire, in which he and his brother Henri invested. He successfully continued his father's social and industrial projects, developing the chocolate factory at Noisiel and the workers' city beside it, first conceived and founded by his father.

In 1910, he commissioned Stephen Sauvestre to build him a secondary residence in Lamorlaye in the Oise.Completed in 1913, it was named 'Tourne-Bride'. In 1940 it was requisitioned by the Wehrmacht, who used it to house the Bois Larris Lebensborn.

== Awards ==
In 1892, he was made an officer in the Legion of Honour.

== Sources ==
- "Gaston Menier", in Dictionnaire des parlementaires français (1889-1940), edited by Jean Jolly, PUF, 1960
