= Minier (disambiguation) =

Minier may refer to:

- Minier, French surname
- Minier, Illinois, United States
- Saint-Laurent-le-Minier, Gard, France
