= Lombart Chocolate =

French chocolate manufacturer

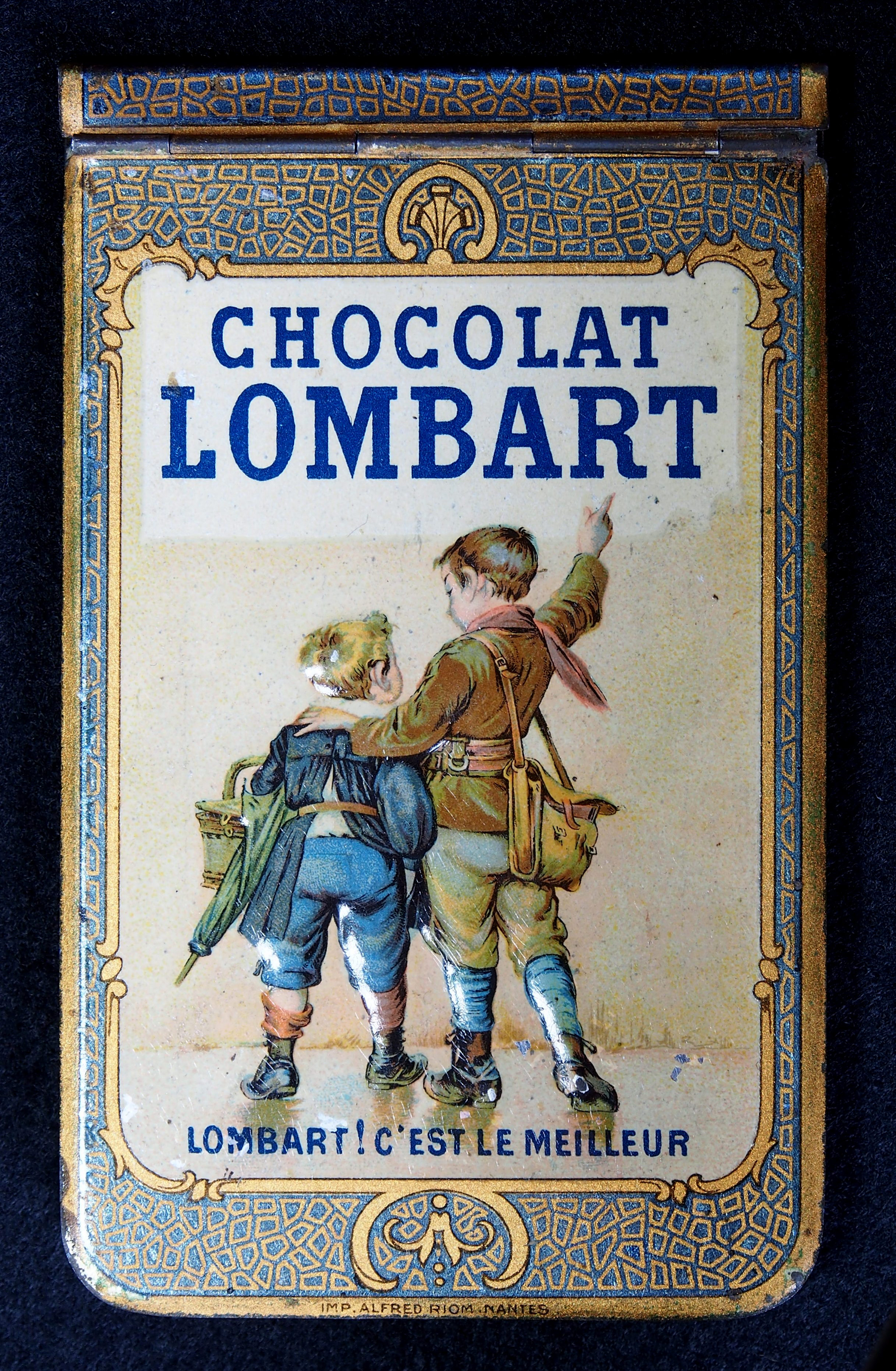
- Native name: Chocolats Lombart, or Chocolaterie Lombart
- Industry: Confectionary
- Founded: 1760
- Founder: Jules-François Lombart
- Defunct: 1957
- Fate: Merged
- Headquarters: Paris, France
- Products: Chocolate

Lombart Chocolate (French: Chocolat Lombart) or Chocolaterie Lombart, was a French chocolate manufacturer. It claimed to be the oldest such company in France, and at its peak was the largest. The company was innovative in providing insurance and a profit-sharing plan to its workers. In the late 1930s it went into decline, and in 1957 was absorbed by Menier Chocolate.

== Foundation ==
Lombart claimed to be the first chocolate company in France. Experiments in France with pressing out cocoa butter date back to at least 1760. One of the labels of the "Lombart" brand of chocolates dates its use from 1760. This was ten years before Pelletier et Pelletier founded a chocolate factory in 1770. The illustrious clients included Madame Victoire, and then Marie-Thérèse, Duchess of Angoulême, also known as Madame Royale. The company produced superior chocolates, fine sweets, chocolate fantasies and Lombart tea. An old box from the Maison Chocolat Lombart is decorated with two medallions recording patents granted by King Louis XVI and later by the Duchess of Angoulême in 1814. The wooden box closed with an iron hook and was lined with fabric. The label shows that the box held chocolate tablets containing nougat cream and priced at 5 centimes per tablet.

== 19th century ==
Jules-François Lombart was born in Paris on 24 February 1830. His parents were from Doullens, Somme.. Lombart became proprietor around 1870. He received the Cross of the Legion of Honour on 23 July 1881 after the Melbourne International Exhibition (1880), where the company had a large display. Lombart introduced various improvements in the manufacturing process, gradually increasing daily output to 10,000 kilograms (22,000 lb) of chocolate. The factory was moved from 3 Rue des Vieille-Étuves-Saint-Honoré to the Rue Jean-de-Deauvais, then to the Rue Keller in the 11th arrondissement, and finally to 75 Avenue de Choisy. In 1860 the factory and offices were located at 75 avenue de Choisy, in the 13th arrondissement of Paris, and were to remain there until the 1940s.

The Chocolaterie Lombart had an exhibit in the Palace of Machines in the Exposition Universelle (1889). In 1889 the Lombart factory was described as a model establishment, the first, the most powerful and the most remarkable of such factories in Paris. It covered 20,000 metres (66,000 ft) and employed over 500 people. The sales office was at 11 Boulevard des Italiens. Lombart established an insurance plan for the workers to cover workplace accidents, including a daily allowance during sickness, medical attention and help with funeral expenses. He also built houses for the workers.

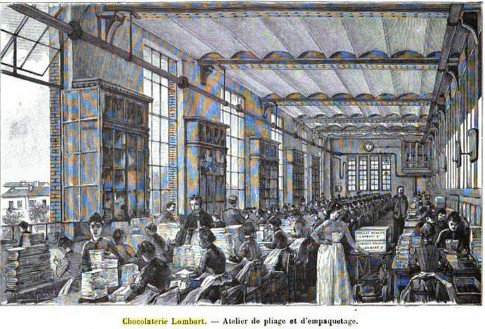
Chocolaterie Lombart wrapping and packing factory around 1889

Lombart instituted a plan by which the workers were given a share of the annual profits. The annual bonus, which in the 1880s varied from 60,000 to 100,000 francs in total, was divided among the workers and staff based on seniority, salary and merit. The owner and two senior managers determined merit, grading performance as "very good", "good", "quite good", "acceptable" and "poor". The bonus was calculated for each of the three evaluations and then averaged. Each worker's bonus took the form of shares in a retirement fund, which paid the worker a pension after 30 years. Young girls were given a portion of their shares at the time of the marriage. The workers were encouraged to save through a monthly payment of 2 francs invested in a fund called l'Abeille.

== 20th century ==
The Chocolaterie Lombart, at the beginning of the twentieth century, was "the biggest factory in Paris", and also had an establishment in Ivry. The company packaged colored cards with its chocolate. Around 1900 it published a series of images of the future world titled "This is how our great-grandchildren will live in the year 2012". The series gave an optimistic view, including one of modern aviation replacing the Zeppelin. One card showed a couple speaking over the telephone to friends in India, with a camera obscura image of their friends projected on the wall. Another showed a brightly lit passenger submarine. The company also distributed paper models of people such as a policeman or jockey with a toothpick as an axle. When assembled and twirled around, the toys would perform acrobatics.

The factory was managed dynamically, and at its peak employed almost 800 workers. It went into rapid decline after the strikes of 1936. In the late 1940s the headquarters and offices were located at 68 rue de Mirosmesnil in the 8th arrondissement of Paris. In 1957 Menier Chocolate absorbed the company.

The factory at 75 avenue de Choisy is now the site of the lycée Gabriel Fauré. The greater part of the collection of the Musée Lombart in Doullens comes from the legacy that Jules François Lombart (1830-1915) gave to the town in 1908. (Note: Jules-François Lombart was son of Catherine Legris and Adolphe Lombart. He was a great traveller, searching for the best strains of cacao. He lived in his villa Boucicaut in Fontenay-aux-Roses, where he was mayor.) The factory at 75 avenue de Choisy was described by the novelist Anne-Marie Garat in her novel Dans la main du diable.

== Sources ==
- Böhmert, Victor; Trombert, Albert (1888), La participation aux bénéfices: étude pratique sur ce mode de rémunération du travail, Chaix
- "Boîte bois ancienne estampillée et gravée Chocolat Lombart 1760 patinée", alittleMarket.com (in French)
- Clarence-Smith, William Gervase (2003-09-02), Cocoa and Chocolate, 1765-1914, Routledge, ISBN 978-1-134-60778-5
- Exposition universelle (1890), L' Exposition universelle de 1889: grand ouvrage illustré historique, encyclopédique, descriptif...
- Harel, Jean-Michel (21 June 2008), Chocolat Lombart et Le Havre (in French)
- Johnson, Edmund (29 April 1881), "Trade Marks", Journal of the Society of Arts
- Jules François Lombart (PDF) (in French), Musée Lombart
- Laeng, Hans-Tommy (2017), Blicke in die Zukunft von anno dazumal (in German), LIT Verlag Münster, ISBN 978-3-643-13512-4
- Langlois, Gilles-Antoine (2000), Le 13ème arrondissement (in French), Parigramme Collection, ISBN 2-84096-194-6
- Le Musée Lombart (in French), Mairie de Doullens, 2016
- Paper Toys: Chocolat Lombart Souvenir de la Fête : Four toys: policeman, private or scout, jockey, clown, AbeBooks
