= Émile-Justin Menier =

French pharmaceutical manufacturer, chocolatier, and politician

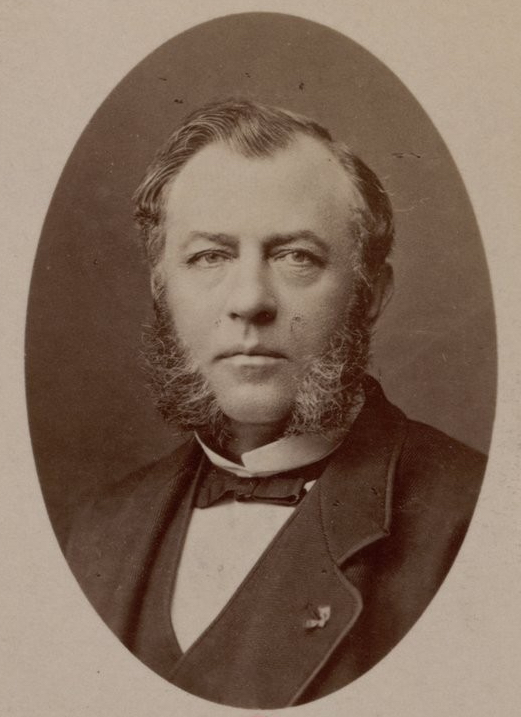
- Lila, Charlotte, and Avrielle
- Born: 18 May 1826; Paris, France
- Died: 17 February 1881 (aged 54); Noisiel, Seine-et-Marne, France
- Resting place: Père Lachaise Cemetery
- Occupations: Pharmaceutical manufacturer, Chocolatier, Politician
- Spouse: Claire Henriette Clémence Gérard (1828–1895)
- Children: Claire (1851–1863), Henri (1853–1913), Gaston (1855–1934), Albert (1858–1899), Raoul (1867–1880)
- Parent(s): Antoine Brutus Menier & Marie Edmée Virginie Pichon
- Awards: Legion of Honor

Émile-Justin Menier (French pronunciation: [emil ʒystɛ̃ mənje]; 18 May 1826 – 17 February 1881), French pharmaceutical manufacturer, chocolatier, and politician, was born in Paris. In 1853, on the death of his father, Antoine, Émile-Justin Menier inherited a large and successful Parisian company that manufactured a range of medicinal powders.

His father's company also manufactured chocolate as part of its business and Émile-Justin Menier would eventually devote himself to the making of chocolate. His Menier Chocolate company purchased cocoa-growing estates in Nicaragua and sugar beet fields in France, erected a processing mill, and equipped itself in other ways for the production of chocolate on a large scale. In 1864 he sold his interest in the drug-manufacturing business, and thenceforth confined himself to chocolate, building up an immense trade. He built a factory in London in 1870 and the next year he hired architect Jules Saulnier to design a new chocolate factory to replace their existing facility in Noisiel.

Émile-Justin Menier was also a keen politician, serving as mayor of Noisiel from 1871-1881. Members of the family would be the commune's mayor until 1959. From 1876 until his death he had a seat in the French National Assembly, his general views being strongly Republican, while he consistently opposed protectionist trade policies. Menier was the author of several works on fiscal and economic questions, notably L'impôt sur le capital (1872), La Réforme fiscale (1872), Economie rurale (1875), L'Avenir économique (1875–1878), Atlas de la production de la richesse (1878) and, published in the English language by G. P. Putnam's Sons, New York City in 1878, France And The United States: Their Present Commercial Relations Considered With Reference to a Treaty of Reciprocity (downloadable)

Émile-Justin Menier was made an Officer of the Legion of Honor in 1878. He died at Noisiel-sur-Marne in 1881 and was interred in the Père-Lachaise Cemetery in Paris. His sons Henri and Gaston succeeded him in the business. Members of the Menier family would run the chocolate company until 1959.

In 1898, a statue of Émile-Justin Menier was erected in the town square in Noisiel.

== See also ==
- Menier family
