= Meunier =

Meunier is a surname. It originates as an occupational surname for a miller or someone otherwise associated with a mill, from the Old French word meulnier. An additional origin for the surname as a nickname relating to a type of fish has been preposed. However, the plausibility of the name emerging from its use as a term to refer to european chub has been questioned. Some instances of the name have also been said to have occurred as a variant to the surname Migner, as an altered form of the surname Mignier, or as a locational surname for a commune called Meunet.

Notable people with the surname include:

- Achille Dauphin-Meunier (1906–1984), French professor, anarchist, and syndicalist
- Adrien Meunier (1905–1971), Canadian lawyer and politicia
- Agathe Meunier (born 1993), French acrobatic gymnast
- Alain Meunier (born 1942), French cellist
- Alex Meunier (1897–1983), American politician
- Alphonse Meunier (1857–1918), Belgian microbiologist
- Angelique Meunier (born 1985), Australian music producer
- Antonine Meunier (1877–1972), French ballet dancer
- Bernadette Bouchon-Meunier, French computer scientist
- Bernard Meunier (born 1947), French chemist
- Claude Meunier (born 1951), Canadian actor and film director
- Claude Marie Meunier (1770–1846), French general during the Napoleonic Wars
- Constantin Meunier (1831–1905), Belgian painter and sculptor
- Charles Meunier (1903–1971), Belgian cyclist
- Christian Meunier (born 1967), French-American businessman
- David Meunier (born 1973), American film and television actor
- Denise Meunier (1918–2022), French schoolteacher and resistant
- Édouard Meunier (1894–?), French cyclist
- Hyacinthe-Eugène Meunier (1841–1906), French artist
- Fabrice Meunier (born 1973), French paralympic archer
- Fanny Meunier (born 1961), French actress
- Françoise Meunier (born 1949), Belgian medical doctor
- Frédérique Meunier (born 1960), French lawyer and politician
- Georges Meunier (1925–?), French cyclist
- Georgette Meunier (1859–1951), Belgian still life painter
- Henri Meunier (1873–1922), Belgian art nouveau illustrator
- Hubert Meunier (born 1959), Luxembourgish soccer player
- Hugues Meunier (1721–1792), French army brigadier general
- James Meunier (1885–1957), English cricketer and soccer player
- Jean-Claude Meunier (1950–1985), French cyclist
- Jean-Henri Meunier (1949–2024), French director
- Jonathan Meunier (born 1987), Canadian mixed martial artist
- Joseph Meunier (1755–1829), Lower Canada politician
- Laurent Meunier (born 1979), French-Swiss ice hockey player
- Lucien Meunier (1907–2000), French politician
- Manon Meunier (born 1996), French politician
- Marie Meunier (born 1992), Belgian politician
- Marie-Geneviève Meunier (1743–1794), French martyred Catholic saint
- Mario Meunier (1880–1960), French translator
- Mark Meunier (born 1964), American professional stock car racing driver
- Maurice Meunier (1890–1971), French footballer
- Michel Meunier, Canadian professor
- Michelle Meunier (born 1956), French politician
- Monique Meunier, former New York City Ballet principal dancer
- Ophélie Meunier (born 1987), French television presenter
- Pascal Meunier (photographer) (born 1966), French documentary photographer
- Pascal Meunier (diplomat) (born 1953), French diplomat
- Patricia Meunier-Lebouc (born 1972), French golfer
- Philippe Meunier (born 1966), French politician
- Raymond Meunier (1920–2010), French actor
- Robert Meunier du Houssoy (1888–1968), French soldier and publisher
- Sébastien Meunier (born 1974), French fashion designer
- Stanislas-Étienne Meunier (1843–1925), French geologist
- Stéfani Meunier (born 1971), Canadian writer
- Sophie Meunier (born c. 1967), senior research scholar
- Théodule Meunier (1860–1907), French anarchist
- Thomas Meunier (born 1991), Belgian football player
- Victor Meunier (1817–1903), French writer and political activist

== See also ==
- Menier (disambiguation)
- Minier
