= Jules Saulnier =

French architect

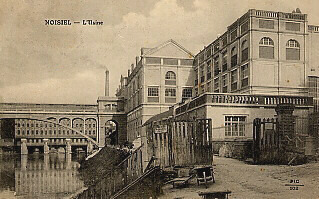
Menier factory in Noisiel, 1911

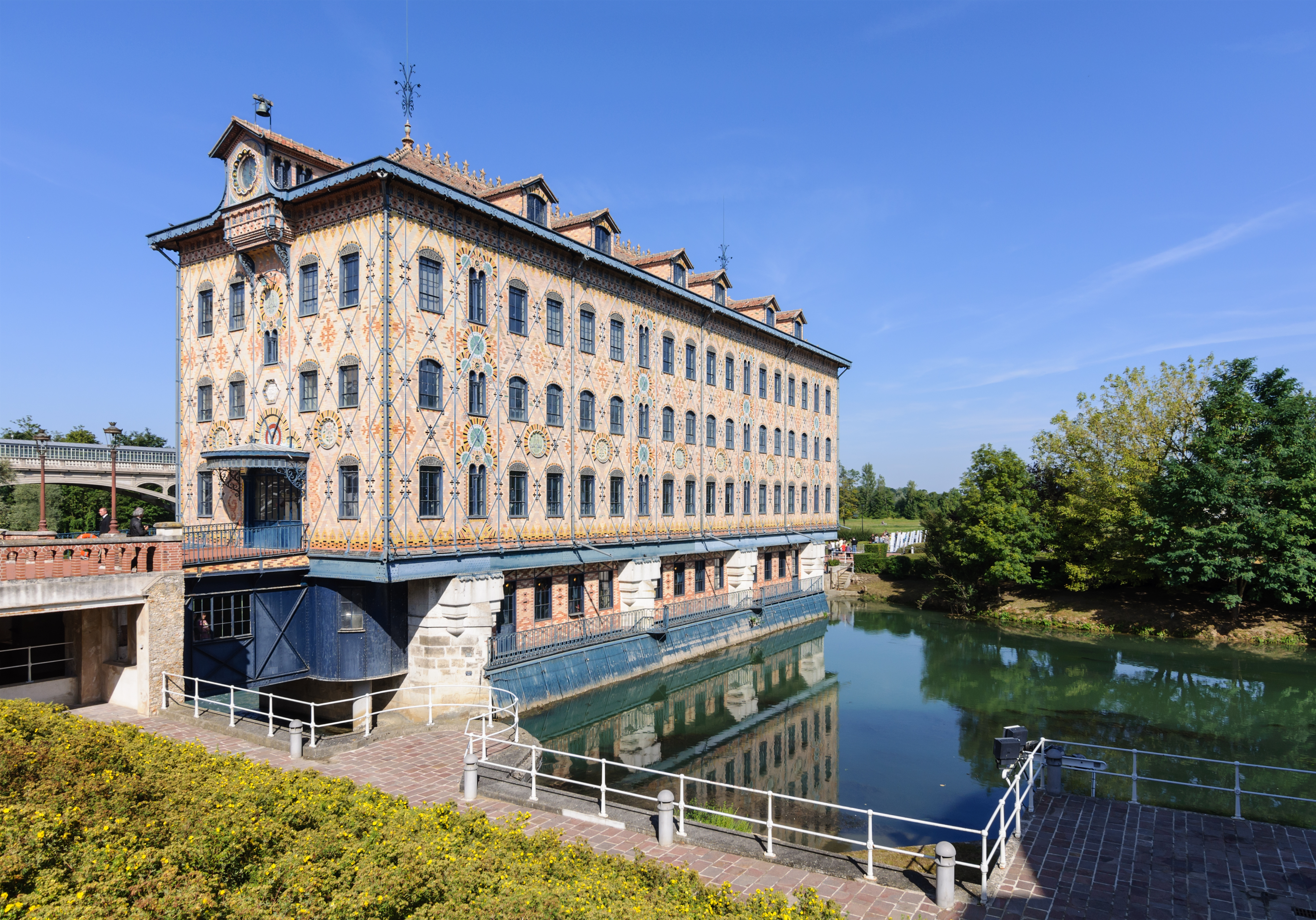
Moulin Saulnier (Noisiel, 2012)

Jules Saulnier (French pronunciation: [ʒyl sonje]; 1817–1881) was a French architect. He is best remembered for his work on the Menier Chocolate Co. buildings in Noisiel, France. Many historians cite his 1872 building as the first true skeleton structure, having its exterior walls requiring only simple infill. However the lesser known Watson's Hotel erected in distant Mumbai in 1869 from prefabricated components cast in England also has an expressed cast iron frame with infill walls of brick. The February 1997 issue of the Architectural Review called the iron and brick chocolate factory at Noisiel "one of the iconic buildings of the Industrial Revolution". In 1992, the factory was designated by the government of France as an official Monument historique and is on the list to be named a UNESCO World Heritage Site.

A street in the Parisian suburb of Saint-Denis is named in Jules Saulnier's honor.
