= Abel Mignon =

French artist and engraver

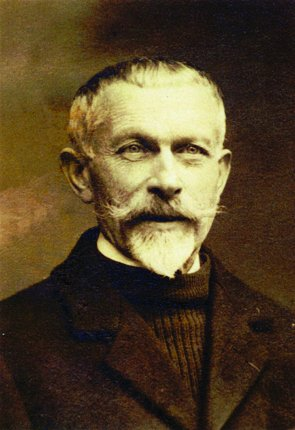
- Born: Justin-Abel-François Mignon; December 2, 1861; Bordeaux
- Died: January 30, 1936 (aged 74); Fontainebleau
- Resting place: Fontainebleau cemetery
- Known for: Engraving postage stamps and posters
- Notable work: Le Travail, Caisse d’Amortissement postage stamp
- Family: Yvonne Bouisset-Mignon
- Awards: Legion of Honour; 1908

Abel Mignon (2 December 1861 – 30 January 1936) was a French artist and engraver. He engraved postage stamps for France, its colonies and for Czechoslovakia, as well as posters and currency. He studied at the Paris Académie des Beaux-Arts and was a Legion of Honour awardee.

== Family life and education ==
Justin Abel François Xavier Mignon was born in Bordeaux on 2 December 1861.

During his youth Mignon composed poems in association with Léonce Burret, Charles Fuster and Lucien Schnegg.

He studied painting with Jean-Léon Gérôme and Alfred Loudet, and Louis Pierre Henriquel-Dupont was his engraving professor. He was admitted to the Beaux-Arts de Paris in 1882, attempted the prix de Rome scholarship, and in 1884 won the second grand prix for engraving.

Mignon was married and had a daughter, Yvonne Bouisset-Mignon (1891-1978), who also had a career in engraving and was married to Firmin Bouisset.

On 30 January 1936 Mignon died at Fontainebleau and is interred there; his tomb features a bronze medallion portrait executed by Charles Virion.

== Career ==
Mignon's debut was at the Salon des artistes français in 1887, where he exhibited wood engravings in the style of Édouard Toudouze. He was twice named laureate of the Académie des Beaux-Arts in 1903 and 1923). In 1908 he was awarded the Legion of Honour. Between 1909 and 1923 he was commissioned by the Chalcographie du Louvre.

In 1910 he ran, with success, as a candidate in the elections of Seine-et-Marne against Jacques-Louis Dumesnil. Mignon then devoted his time to painting, inspired by Fontainebleau where he lived for a time before returning to engraving.

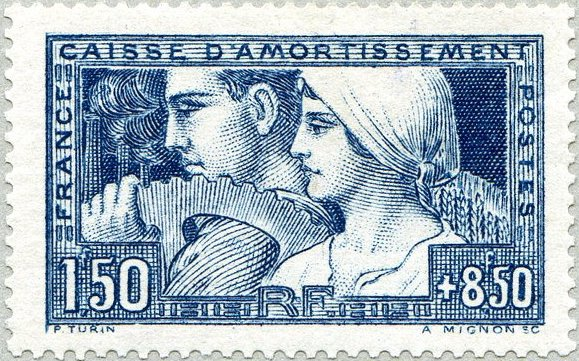
1928 Le Travail Caisse d’Amortissement stamp

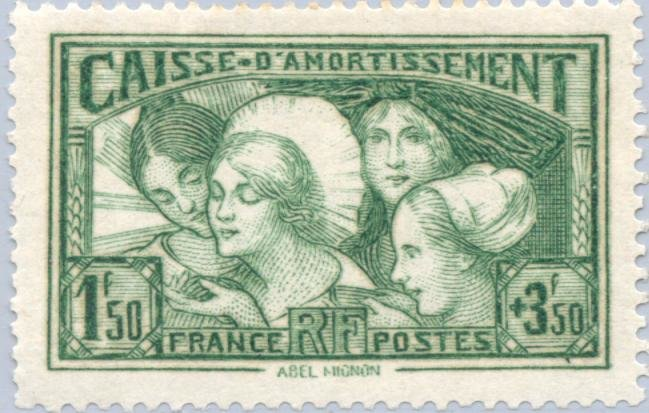
1931 Caisse d’Amortissement stamp

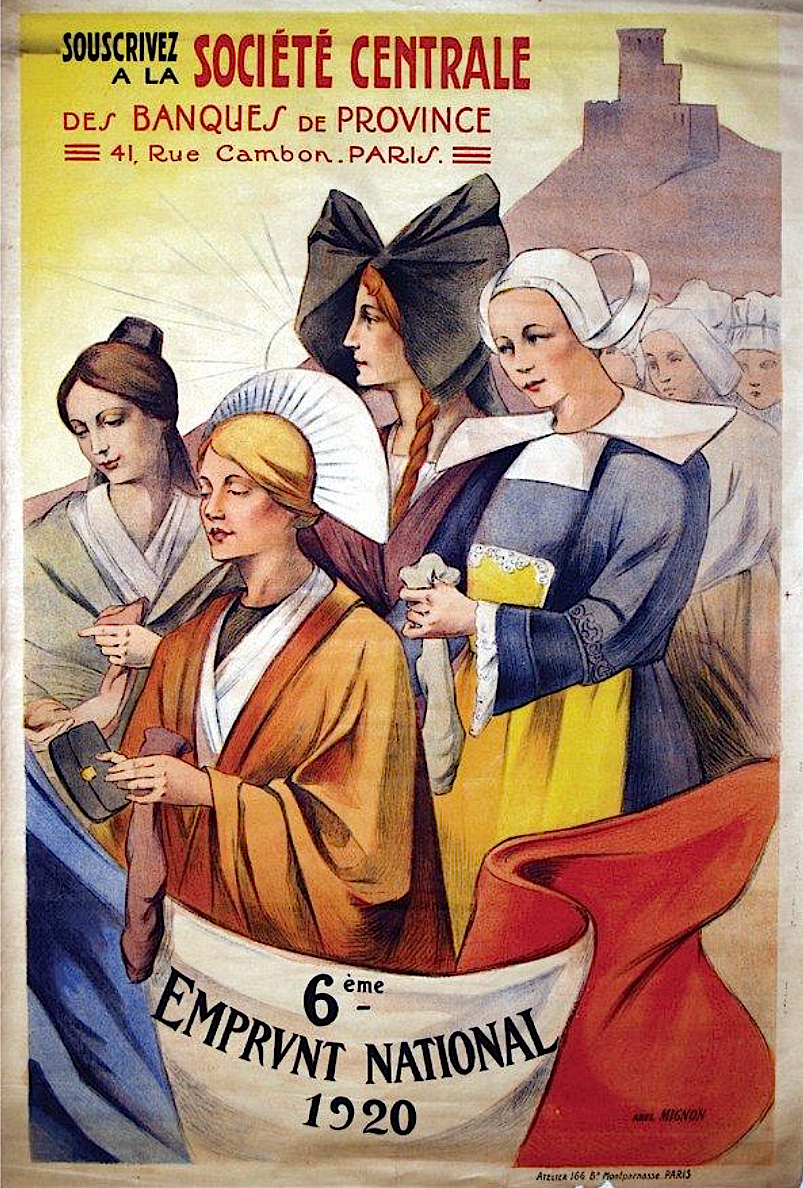
Poster for 6th National Loan in 1920

From 1913 he engraved postage stamps for the French colonies in Africa, such as Dahomey, Guyana, Madagascar, some in the style of works by Joseph de La Nézière and from 1920 after Paul Albert Laurens and Jules Chaplain for the French post office. He created posters for French national causes, such as the 1920 6th National Loan.

His 1928 semi-postal stamp for the Caisse d'Amortissement, Sinking Fund, was the first to use the intaglio printing method. The design was after a work by Albert Turin. From 1927 he also worked for the Czechoslovak post office engraving stamps after the work of Jaroslav Šetelík.

Lithographer and engraver Bertrand Bonpunt studied under Mignon.

== Bibliography ==
- M. Couvé, Abel Mignon, graveur, tome 1, Société philatélique de Fontainebleau, 2005.
- Abel Mignon, in: Relais n° 100, revue de la Société des amis du musée de la Poste, décembre 2007.
