= Mounier =

Mounier is a French occupational surname, meaning "miller" a regional variant of Meunier. Notable people with the surname include:

- Anthony Mounier (born 1987), French footballer
- Emmanuel Mounier (1905–1950), French philosopher
- Flo Mounier (born 1974), French drummer
- Jean-Jacques Mounier (born 1949), French judoka
- Jean Joseph Mounier (1758–1806), French politician

== See also ==
- Menier
- Minier
