= Louis Pierre Henriquel-Dupont =

French engraver (1797–1892)

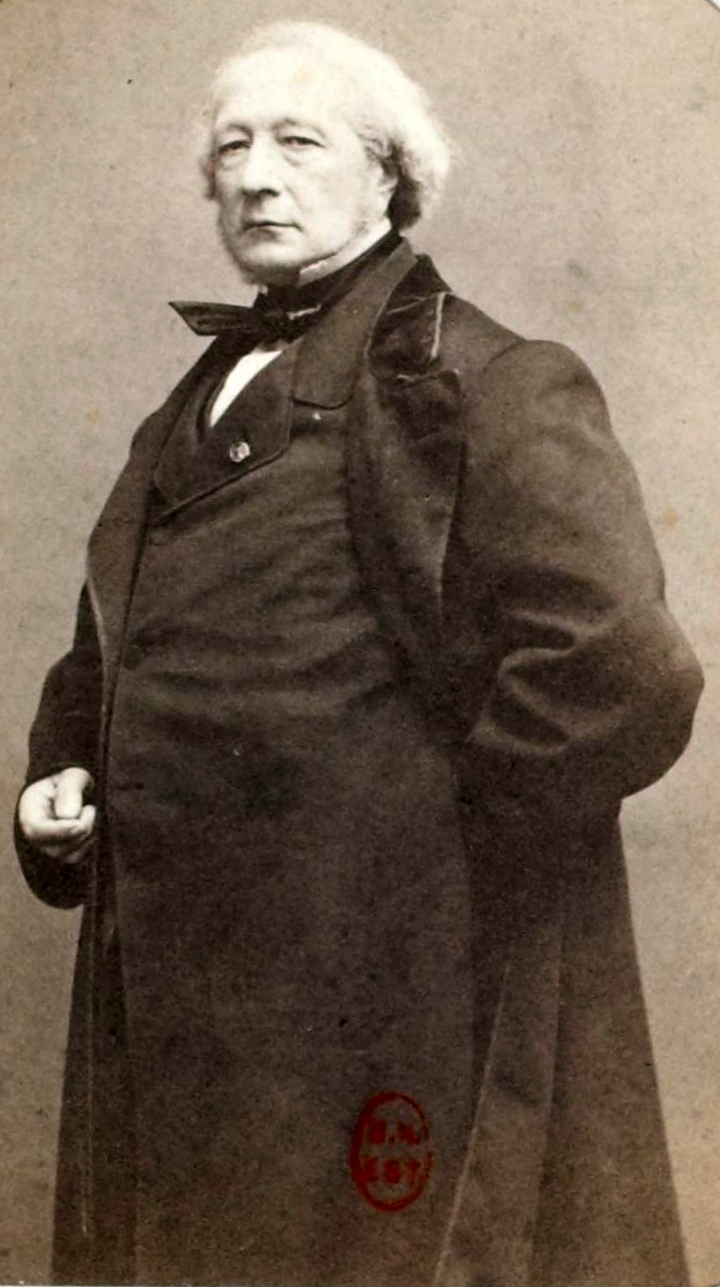
- Henriquel-Dupont photographié par Étienne Carjat, vers 1865-1870.
- Born: Louis Pierre Henriquel dit Dupont; 13 June 1797 former 2nd arrondissement of Paris
- Died: 20 January 1892 (aged 94); Paris
- Occupation: Engraver

Louis Pierre Henriquel-Dupont (Paris 13 June 1797 – 20 January 1892 Paris) was a French engraver. His students included Charles Bellay, Jean-Baptiste Danguin, Adrien Didier, Alphonse and Jules François, Adolphe-Joseph Huot, Achille and Jules Jaquet, Jules Gabriel Levasseur, Aristide Louis, Louis Marckl, Isidore-Joseph Rousseaux, Abel Mignon and Charles Albert Waltner.

== Life ==
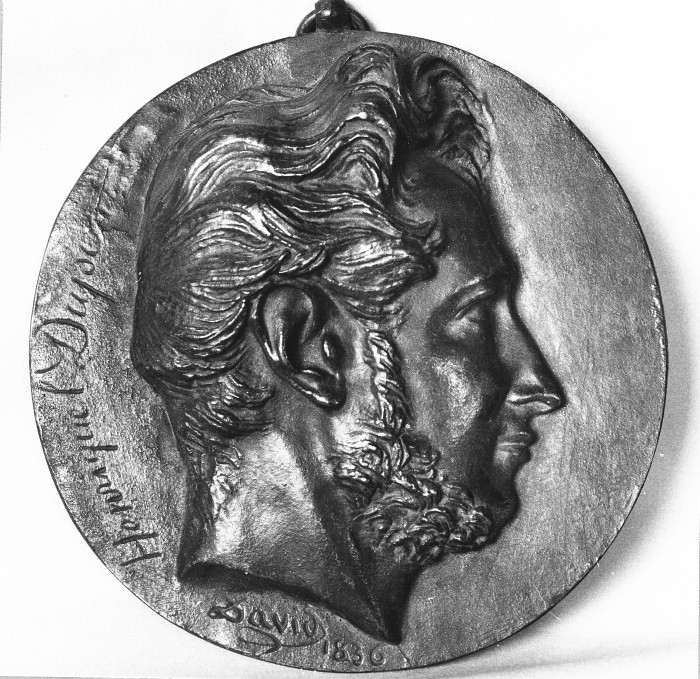
Louis-Pierre Henriquel-Dupont on a bronze medal by David d'Angers.

Between the ages of 14 and 17, he studied painting in the studio of Pierre-Narcisse Guérin at the École des beaux-arts in Paris. He then devoted himself for four years to an apprenticeship in engraving under Charles Clément Balvay, nicknamed "the last of the fine burinists", who made him copy the great masters. Between 1816 and 1818, Henriquel lost out on the first prize for engraving twice, which determined him to set up his own studio and follow new styles. Under the influence of English engravers and of Girard Audran, he tended towards "a live, witty and clear line". In 1831 his engraving after Louis Hersent's Abdication of Gustavus Vasa established his reputation and won him the légion d'honneur. He then worked for six years on his masterwork, an engraving of Paul Delaroche's Hemicycle of the fine arts - this engraving won an honorary medal at the Paris Salon of 1853. In 1849 he was elected a member of the Académie des beaux-arts. He became a professor at the École des beaux-arts in 1863 and founded the Société française de la gravure in 1868. In 1871 he was made president of the Académie des beaux-arts and was still engraving aged 85.

== Works ==
Working not only with the burin but also in the varied fields of lithography, etching and aquatint. His other originality is in having engraved many paintings by his contemporaries : Paul Delaroche, Ary Scheffer, Dominique Ingres, Joseph-Nicolas Robert-Fleury, Antoine-Jean Gros, François Gérard; it was only towards the end of his life that he dealt with the old masters such as Veronese, Corregio or Caravaggio. As an illustrator, he notably engraved works by Alexandre-Joseph Desenne's and Achille Devéria's vignettes for the Fables by La Fontaine and for La Pucelle d'Orléans by Voltaire, though it is his portraits for which he is most noted:

=== Hemicycle ===
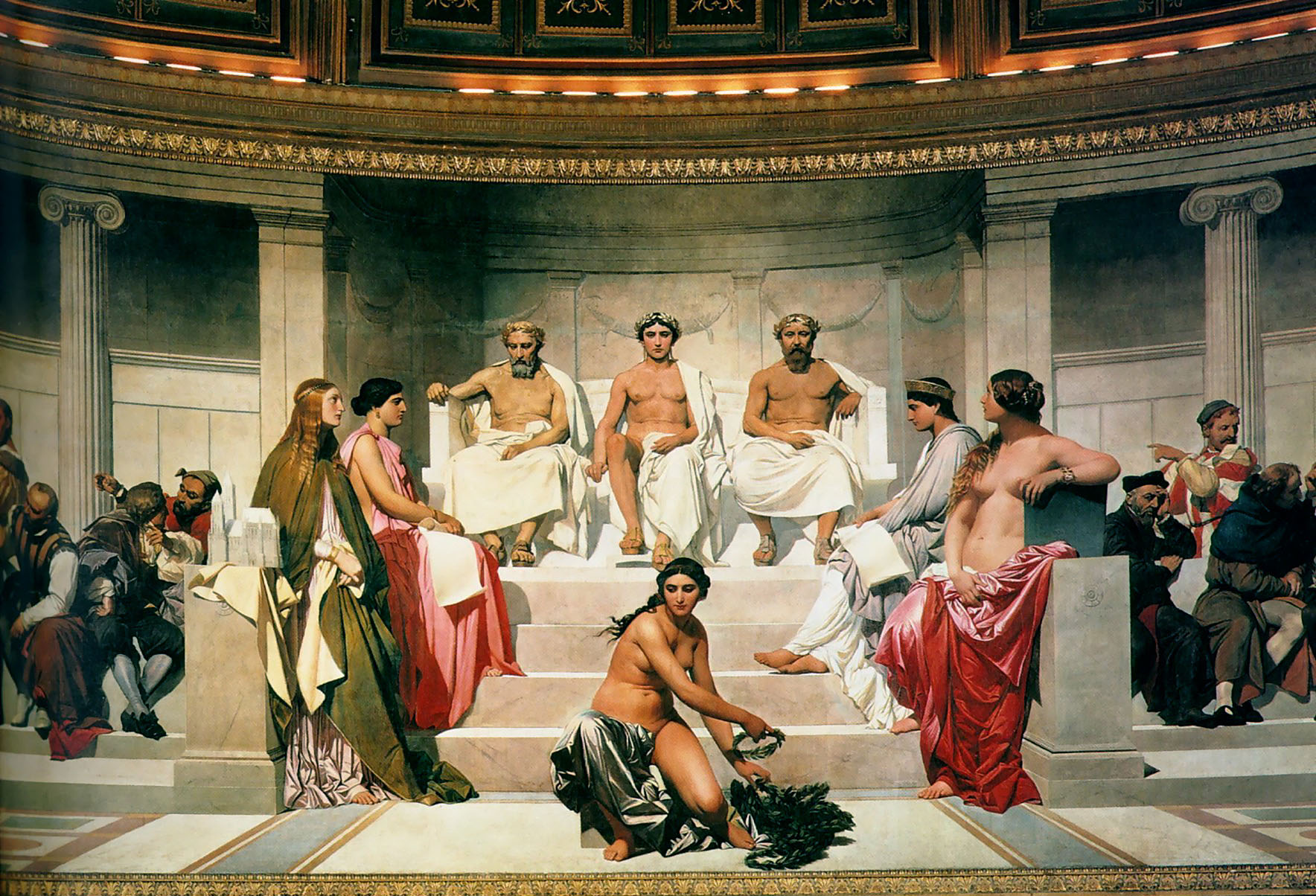
Painting by Paul Delaroche (1841–42).

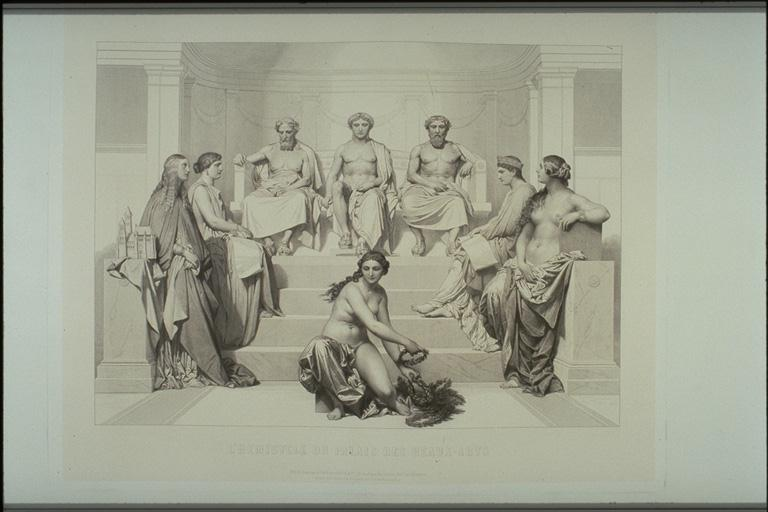
Engraving by Henriquel-Dupont (1853).

The central panel of the Hemicycle of the Fine Arts at the École nationale supérieure des beaux-arts in Paris.
Assis au fond : Ictinos, Apelles, Phidias. To the left : ancient Greek and medieval art.
To the right: ancient Roman and Renaissance art. Centre :allegory of Art.

Two artists, Théophile Gautier and Charles Blanc, have compared Delaroche's work to that of Henriquel, both preferring the engraver to the painter :

=== Bertin portrait ===
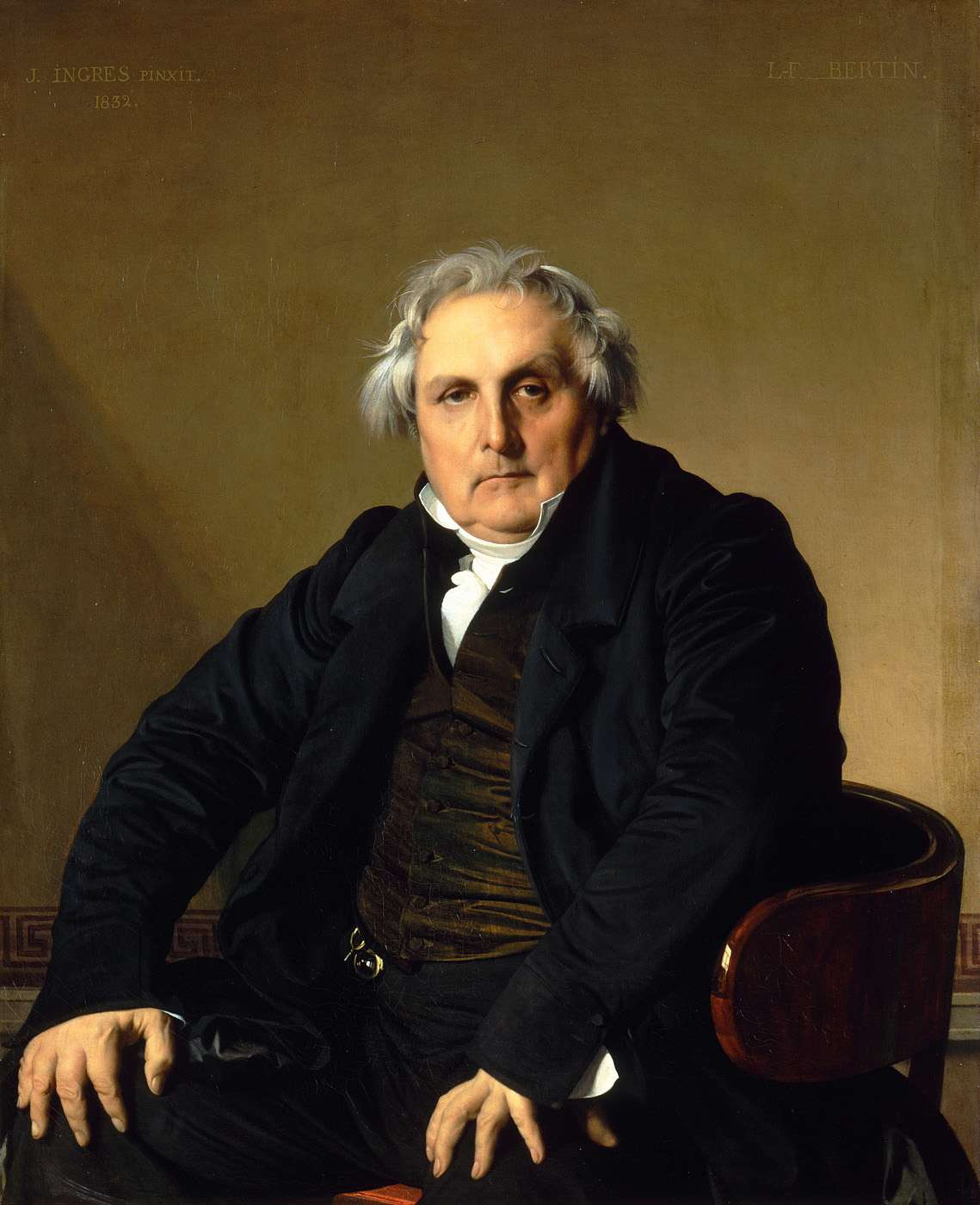
Portrait by Ingres (1832).

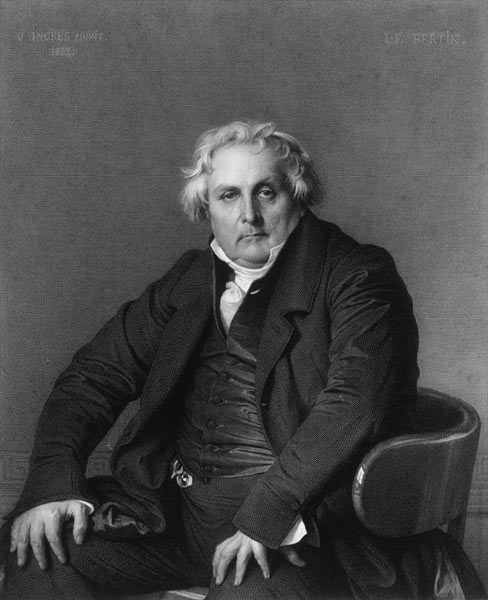
Engraving by Henriquel-Dupont (1844).

One of Henriquel-Dupont's most famous portraits is that of the journalist Louis-François Bertin, engraved in burin after the portrait by Ingres. When they were both shown at the Paris Salon of 1845, Baudelaire preferred the painting to the engraving :

Henriquel Dupont has procured for us the pleasure of contemplating for a second time the magnificent portrait of M. Bertin, by M. Ingres, the only man in France who truly makes portraits. - Without contradiction this is the finest he has made, even including that of Cherubini.— Perhaps the turning fire and majesty of his model doubles the audacity of M. Ingres, the daring man par excellence. — As for the engraving, it is so conscientious to [the painting], we believe it is not at all biased towards the painting. - We will not dare to affirm it, but we believe the engraver has omitted certain small details on the nose and in the eyes.

=== Portraits ===
- Louis-Philippe (after François Gérard)
- Bertin (after Jean-Auguste-Dominique Ingres)
- Ary Scheffer (after Léon Benouville)

=== Other selected works ===
- Burial of Christ (after Hippolyte Delaroche)
- The Abdication of Gustavus Vasa (1831, after Louis Hersent)
- Christus als Tröster (after Ary Scheffer)
- The Mystic Marriage of Saint Catherine (1867, after Correggio)
- Moses (after Hippolyte Delaroche)
- The Supper in Emmaus (Ätzdruck, after Paolo Veronese)
- General Lariboisière and his son (after Antoine-Jean Gros

== Bibliography ==
- Étienne-Jean Delécluze, L'Hémicycle du Palais des Beaux-Arts, peinture murale exécutée par Paul Delaroche. et gravé au burin par M. Henriquel-Dupont. Notice explicative suivie d’un trait figuratif indiquant les noms de tous les personnages, leur naissance, leur mort, etc., Paris, Goupil, Paris, 1857.
