= Antoine Brutus Menier =

French entrepreneur (1795–1853)

Antoine Menier
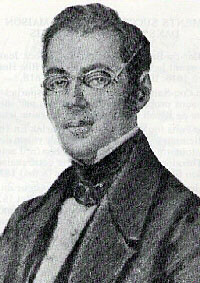
- Born: May 17, 1795; Germain-de-Bourgeuil, France
- Died: December 19, 1853 (aged 58); Passy, France
- Resting place: Père Lachaise Cemetery
- Occupations: Pharmacist, drug manufacturer, chocolatier
- Known for: Founder, Menier Chocolate Co.
- Board member of: Menier Chocolate Co.
- Spouse: Marie Edmée Virginie Pichon (d. 1879)
- Children: Honorine Virginie, Émile-Justin Menier
- Parent(s): Jean André Menier & Renée Catherine Vernet
- Awards: Legion of Honor

Jean-Antoine Brutus Menier (May 17, 1795 – December 19, 1853) was a French entrepreneur and founder of the Menier family of chocolatiers. Born in Germain-de-Bourgeuil, Indre-et-Loire, he was the third child in a family of merchants. In 1811 Antoine Brutus Menier was enrolled in the La Flèche Military Academy where he studied the composition of pharmaceuticals. The following year the 17-year-old served with the medical staff of La Grande Armée in Napoleon's invasion of Russia. In 1813 he was employed at Val-de-Grâce military hospital in Paris.

In 1816, Antoine Brutus Menier married Marie-Edmée Virginie Pichon. With her sizeable dowry he was able to go into business and he established the Menier Hardware Company in the Marais district of Paris. Although not certified as a pharmacist, Menier began preparing and selling a variety of powders for medicinal purposes. This aspect of the business grew rapidly and in 1825 he began an expansion through the acquisition of a second production facility on land on the banks of the Marne River at Noisiel, then a small village of less than 200 inhabitants at the outskirts of Paris.

Chocolate was used as a medicinal product and was only one part of the overall business. Success led to a modernization of the Noisel facility in 1830 that made it the first factory in France to have a mechanized mass production process for chocolate. By 1832 Menier's company offered a wide range of medicinal powders and began publishing a catalog detailing its product line. Following the development of solid chocolate, Menier introduced a block of chocolate wrapped in decorative yellow paper.

Antoine Brutus Menier's success earned him considerable recognition throughout France but soon brought with it criticism for his lack of certification as a pharmacist. However, his skills were such that in 1839 he passed the necessary exams and received his diploma. For his contribution to the growth of the economy of France, in 1842 the government awarded him the Legion of Honor.

In the spring of 1853 Antoine Brutus Menier suffered a stroke that left him paralysed and management of the business was assumed by his son Emile-Justin Menier in a year that saw the company produce more than 4,000 tons of chocolate. Antoine Brutus Menier died in December at his home in Passy. He was buried in the Père Lachaise Cemetery in Paris.
