= Henri Menier =

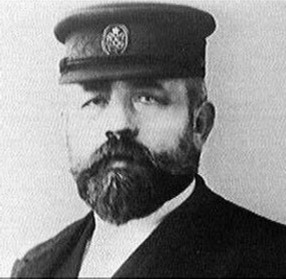
- Menier, c.1900
- Born: July 14, 1853; Paris, France
- Died: September 6, 1913 (aged 60); Vauréal, Val-d'Oise, France
- Resting place: Père Lachaise Cemetery
- Occupations: Businessman, adventurer, race car driver
- Known for: Anticosti Island, Château de Chenonceau
- Board member of: Menier Chocolate, Automobile Club de France, Yacht Club de France
- Spouse: Hélène Thyra Seillière
- Parent: Émile-Justin Menier

Henri Émile Anatole Menier (French pronunciation: [ɑ̃ʁi emil anatɔl mənje]; July 14, 1853 – September 6, 1913) was a French businessman and adventurer and a member of the Menier family of chocolatiers. Born in Paris, he was the son of Émile-Justin Menier and grandson to Antoine Brutus Menier who founded the Menier Chocolate company. On his father's death in 1881, Henri Menier became mayor of Noisiel, an office he held for 32 years until his death in 1913. The beneficiary of a substantial fortune, and having a large annual income from the family business, he spent a great deal of his time and money pursuing various leisure interests, notably yachting and auto racing. As the eldest son, he was the titular head of the company but the day-to-day management would mostly be left to his very capable brother Gaston.

A member of the governing council of the Yacht Club de France, Menier studied naval architecture and yacht design. He owned several large sailing and steam powered yachts and journeyed to numerous European ports and with his a group of friends including René Waldeck-Rousseau, sailed north to Iceland and Norway. Menier undertook a three-year-long voyage through the Mediterranean and Adriatic Seas, the Suez Canal and the Red Sea. He also sailed across the Atlantic Ocean several times to visit Anticosti Island that he owned in the Gulf of St. Lawrence.

When automobiles made their debut, Menier was one of the few who could afford them. He became a racing enthusiast and helped found the Automobile Club de France which would organize the 1906 French Grand Prix, the world's first Grand Prix motor racing event, at the Circuit de la Sarthe, in Le Mans. Menier took part in the 1902 Gordon Bennett Cup Paris to Innsbruck auto race and won the silver medal in the touring car category.

Avid hunters of deer on horseback, Menier and his brothers acquired more than 13,000 acres (53 km^{2}) of forested land in the Picardy region as well as in the Val-d'Oise département where Henri owned a château in the town of Vauréal. In April 1913 Henri Menier also bought the Château de Chenonceau in France's Loire Valley which today is still owned by family members and is a major tourist attraction.

== Anticosti Island development ==
In 1895, Menier bought Anticosti Island at the mouth of the St. Lawrence River in Canada from a British logging company. Originally granted to Louis Jolliet as a seigniory by King Louis XIV, it is a large and heavily forested island and at 217 km in length and 16–48 km wide is one-quarter the size of the country of Belgium.

Menier used it for business as well as a private game reserve, bringing in a variety of wild animals native to Canada including foxes, fishers, reindeer, bison and moose. One of the other species Menier introduced was a herd of 220 white-tailed deer who, because there were no natural predators, thrived. The island's deer population is now estimated at well over 100,000. Along with its 24 rivers and streams bountiful with salmon and trout, it is today a paradise for paleontologists, bird watchers, hikers, and a major draw for anglers and hunters, particularly those from the United States.

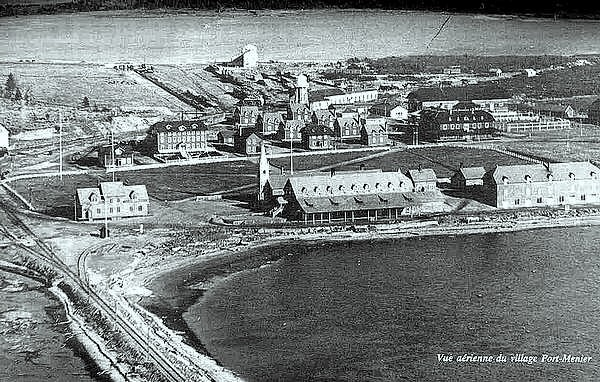
Port-Menier, Anticosti Island, c. 1922

Menier named the 70-metre-high (230 ft) Vauréal Falls on Anticosti Island after the town of Vauréal in France where he owned a home. At Anticosti, he hoped to set up a seigniory that could be self-supporting. He first established a settlement at Bay Sainte-Claire in 1895 but the bay proved too shallow for the large ships he would need. In 1900, he moved the settlement to Ellis Bay and established Port-Menier along the waterfront with a 1,000 meter wharf. He invested a substantial amount of money to construct a sawmill to service the logging operations that harvested softwood timber for building lumber and Wood pulp for the manufacture of paper products. The community was centered on a new cannery business designed to take advantage of the abundant supply of fish and lobsters. The town had its own hospital, school, Roman Catholic church, general store, bank, bakery, hotel, plus homes and rooming houses for the workers, and 30-room Scandinavian-style mansion for himself. Once completed, the island was home to 800 permanent residents, most of whom were French Canadians. Residents and businesses obtained supplies from a sailing ship Menier operated between Quebec City and the Gaspé, and obtained coal from the mines at Sydney, Nova Scotia.

In June 1911, Menier married Hélène Thyra Seillière who shared his love of the outdoors. However, a diabetic, he died childless a little more than a year after his marriage. He was buried in the Père Lachaise Cemetery. His brother Gaston became the owner of Anticosti Island. He used and maintained it for a time but eventually decided it was not an economically viable proposition and sold it to the Wayagamack Pulp and Paper Company in 1926. Many of the original houses still stand today.

Rue Henri Menier in Sept-Îles, Quebec, was named in his honor.

== Additional sources ==
- Extensive information and photographs on the Menier family in the French language
- Lionel Lejeune. Époque des Menier à Anticosti, 1895–1926. (1987) Éditions JML, Saint-Hyacinthe, Quebec. ISBN 2-89234-029-2
- 1999 Documentary film by Jean-Claude Labrecque entitled Anticosti, au temps des Menier (Anticosti, in the time of Menier)
- Government of Quebec website on Henri Menier and Anticosti Island
