= Munier =

Munier (pronounced [mynje]) is a French surname, meaning "miller" a regional variant of Meunier.

Notable people with this surname include:

- Carlo Munier (1859–1911), Italian mandolinist
- Émile Munier (1840–1895), French artist
- Ernest Munier-Chalmas (1843–1903), French geologist
- Henri Munier (1884–1945), French bibliographer
- Laurent Munier (born 1966), French handball player
- Mishuk Munier (1959–2011), Bangladeshi journalist
- Nick Munier (born 1968), English maitre d'hotel
- Roger Munier (1923–2010), French writer
- Vincent Munier (born 1976), French wildlife photographer

== As given name ==
- Munier Choudhury (1925–1971), Bangladeshi educationist

== See also ==
- Menier
