= Menier Chocolate =

French chocolate manufacturer

Menier
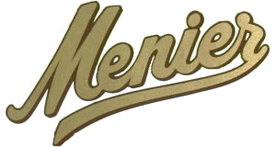
- Type: Private (1816–1971); Subsidiary (1971–)
- Industry: Food
- Founded: 1816; 210 years ago in Paris
- Founder: Antoine Brutus Menier
- Fate: Acquired by Rowntree Mackintosh Confectionery in 1971
- Headquarters: Broc (FR), Switzerland
- Area served: Worldwide
- Products: Chocolate bars
- Owner: Nestlé
- Website: menier.co.uk

The Menier Chocolate company (French: Chocolat Menier) is a French chocolate manufacturing business founded in 1816 as a pharmaceutical manufacturer in Paris, at a time when chocolate was used as a medicinal product and was only one part of the overall business.

Founded by Antoine Brutus Menier, the company remained managed by his family until 1971, when it was acquired by Rowntree Mackintosh Confectionery. In 1988, Menier became part of Swiss conglomerate Nestlé when it acquired Rowntree Mackintosh. In 1996, Menier moved production to Swiss municipality of Broc, where it has remained since then. The former factory building at Noisiel was turned into the headquarters of Nestlé France.

== History ==
=== The Menier family ===
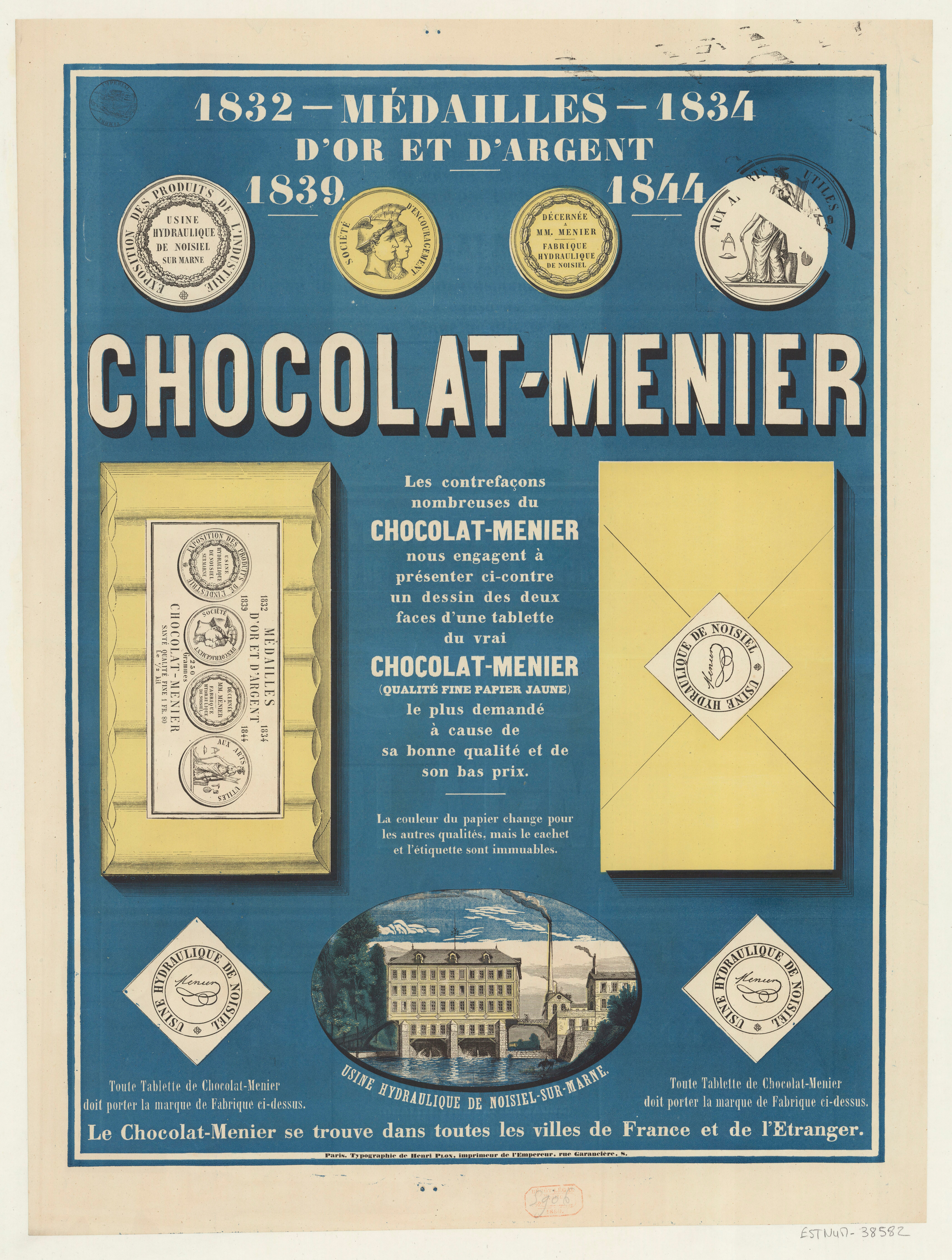
Poster displaying the chocolate tablet produced from the 1830s

In 1816, Antoine Brutus Menier founded the Menier Hardware Company in Paris. Although not trained as a pharmacist, he began preparing and selling a variety of powders for medicinal purposes. The business grew rapidly but for the first few years the company's production of chocolate was very limited, as its primary usage was as a medicinal powder and for coating bitter-tasting pills.

=== Factory at Noisiel ===
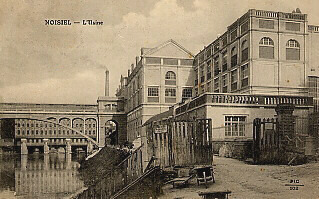
Menier factory in Noisiel, 1911

In 1825 the company began an expansion through the acquisition of a second production facility on land on the banks of the Marne River at Noisiel, at the time a small village of less than 200 inhabitants at the outskirts of Paris. Initially used as a grinding works for the production of medicinal powders, a modernization of the Noisiel facility in 1830 made it the first mechanized mass production factory for cocoa powder in France. In 1836, following the development of solid chocolate, Menier introduced to the market a chocolate tablet with six semi-cylindrical divisions wrapped in decorative yellow paper. By 1842, the success of the chocolate business led to another expansion of the Noisiel plant and by 1853 annual chocolate production reached 4,000 tons. A document from 1845 attests the manufacturing of a wide variety of chocolate products at the Noisiel factory, from medicinal to baking and eating chocolate, and semi-finished products like cocoa butter, cocoa powder and cocoa mass.

Under the leadership of the founder's son, Emile-Justin Menier, the company concentrated solely on the manufacturing of chocolate products. In 1864 he sold off the pharmaceutical manufacturing part of the business and began a period of expansion that made the Menier Chocolate company the largest chocolate manufacturer in France. Under Emile-Justin Menier, the company purchased cocoa-growing estates in Nicaragua along with sugar beet fields and a sugar refinery at Roye in the Somme in France.

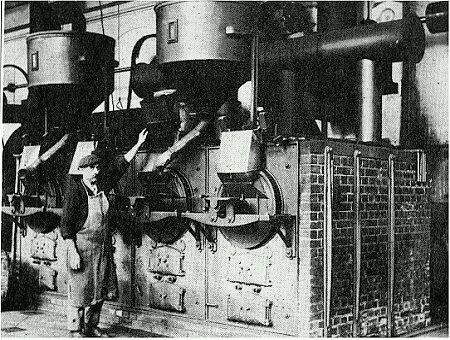
Menier factory in Noisiel, 1866

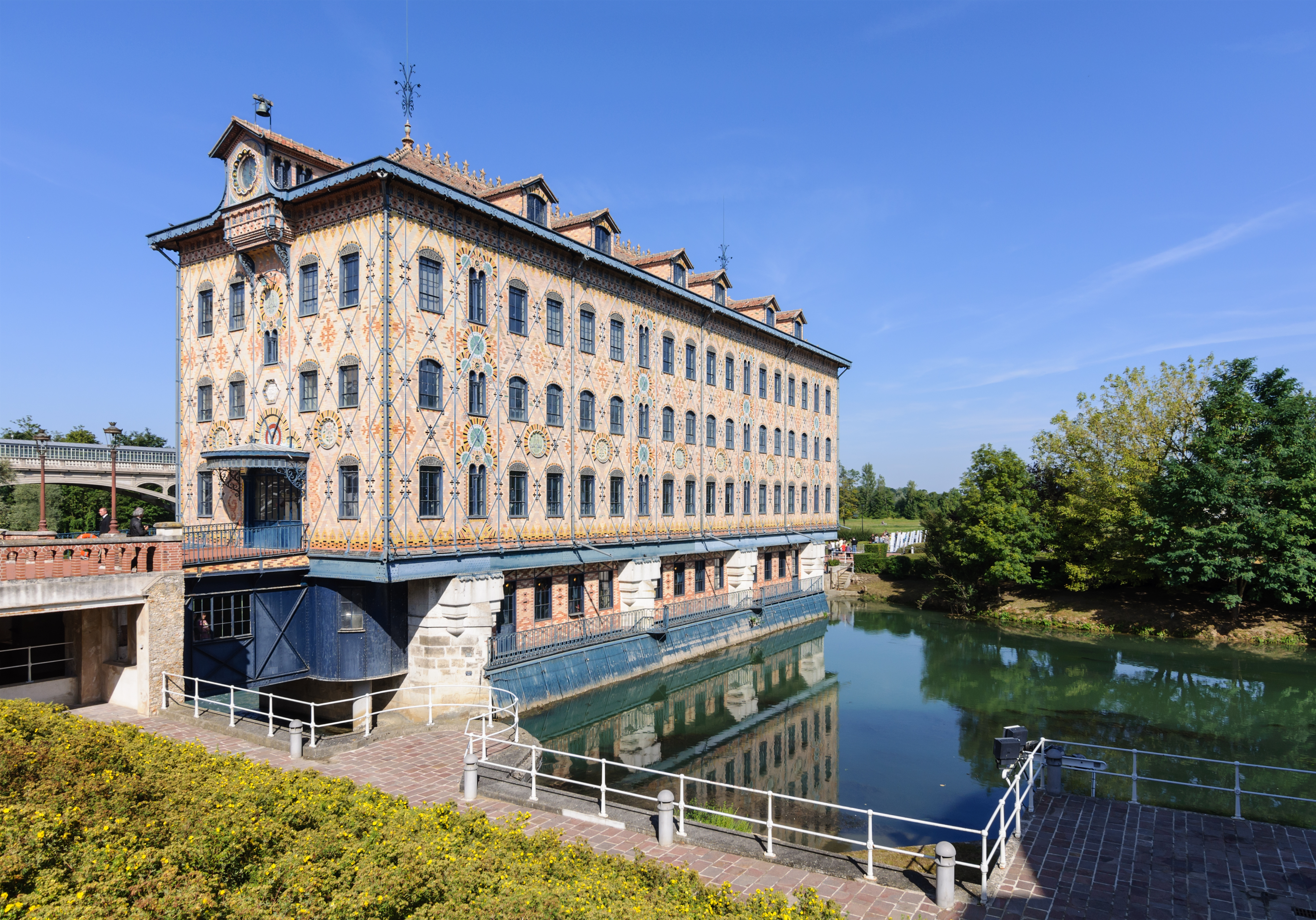
Saulnier's building, 2012

Beginning in 1860, Emile-Justin Menier oversaw the addition of several new buildings then, after constructing a factory in London and a distribution center in New York City, in 1872 he initiated a major expansion that saw the construction of the most modern production facilities in the world. Designed by architect Jules Saulnier, many historians cite the building as the first true skeleton structure with exterior walls needing only simple infill.

The February 1997 issue of the Architectural Review called the 1872 iron and brick chocolate factory at Noisiel "one of the iconic buildings of the Industrial Revolution". In 1992, the factory was designated by the government of France as an official Monument historique and is on the list to be named a UNESCO World Heritage Site.

Menier factory floor, Noisiel, c. 1874

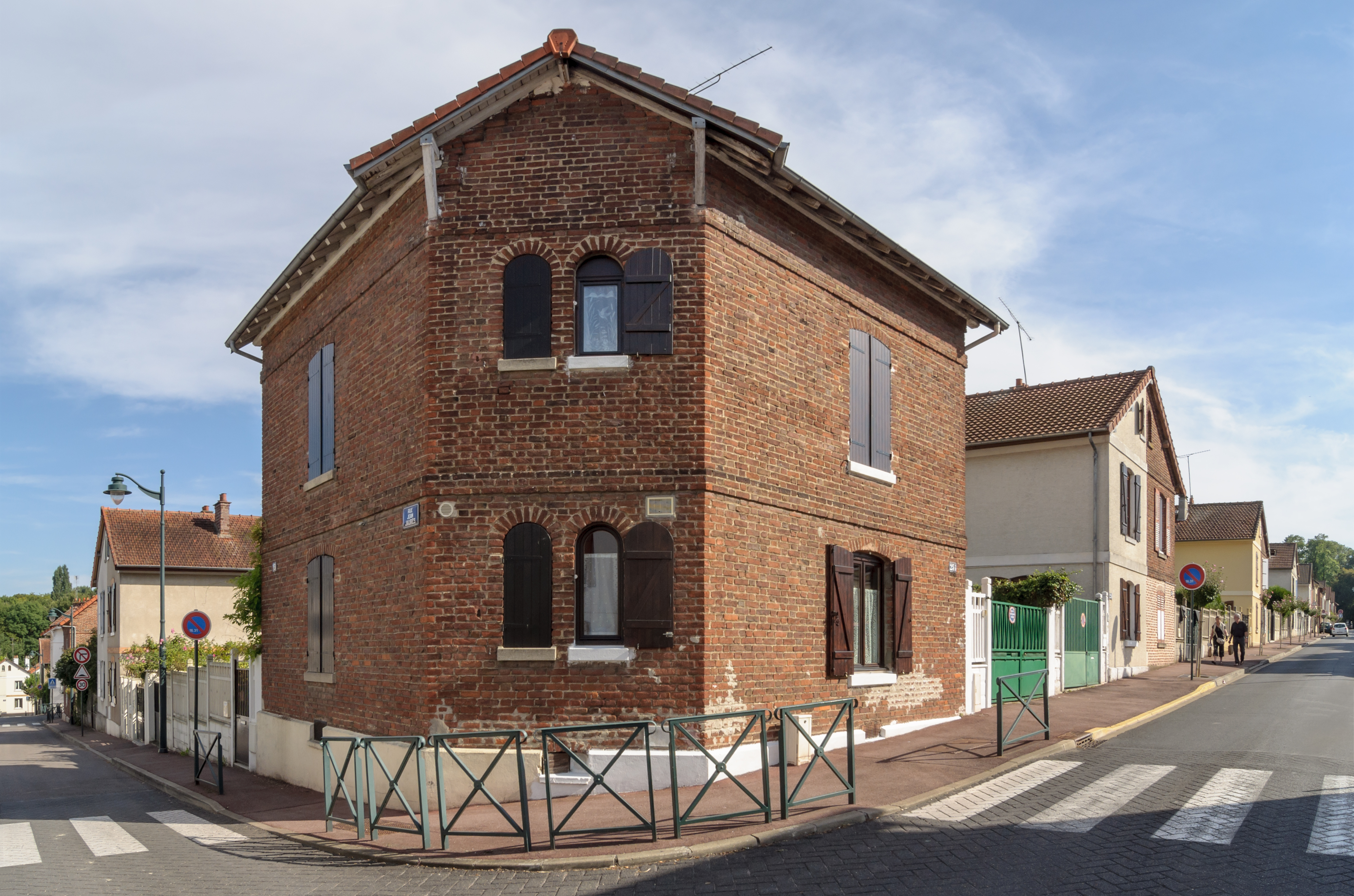
Houses in the Menier company town in Noisiel

As a result of the factory expansions, by the mid-1880s production capacity at the Noisiel plant jumped to 125,000 tons annually and the company employed 2000 people. Because of the Menier company's rapid growth, the shortage of workers available from the small village forced the company to try to attract labor from other towns and cities. However, a lack of housing in Noisiel made that nearly impossible and as a result, in 1874, Menier completed construction of 312 residences on 30 hectares of land near the factory. They would also build a school for their employees' children and three decades later, a senior citizens' home for their retired workers.

In the 1870s, the Meniers also built the Noisiel town hall where a family member would serve as mayor without interruption from 11 May 1871 to 8 November 1959. At the 1878 World's Fair in Paris, the company was awarded seven gold medals plus the Grand Prize for the excellence of their products as well as citations for their modern production methods and the importance the company placed on the well-being of its employees.

Following the death of Emile-Justin Menier, in 1881 his sons Henri and Gaston assumed control of the business. As the eldest son, Henri Menier became the titular head of the company. Although involved in the business, he spent a great deal of his time pursuing various leisure interests and left much of the company's management to brother Gaston who would oversee a period of sustained prosperity. Of extreme importance to the sustaining of the Menier Chocolate Company's competitiveness were several internal and external developments in the second half of the 1870s and the early part of the 1880s.

The Menier plant added modern refrigeration systems and in 1881 a railroad line was built to the Noisiel factory which reduced costs for incoming and outgoing freight and allowed for wider and faster distribution. Externally, Swiss chocolate manufacturers were making advancements in product development. They began mass production and promotion of milk chocolate and the new conching process provided a type of chocolate that consumers liked because it would melt in the mouth.

=== Pioneering advertising strategies ===
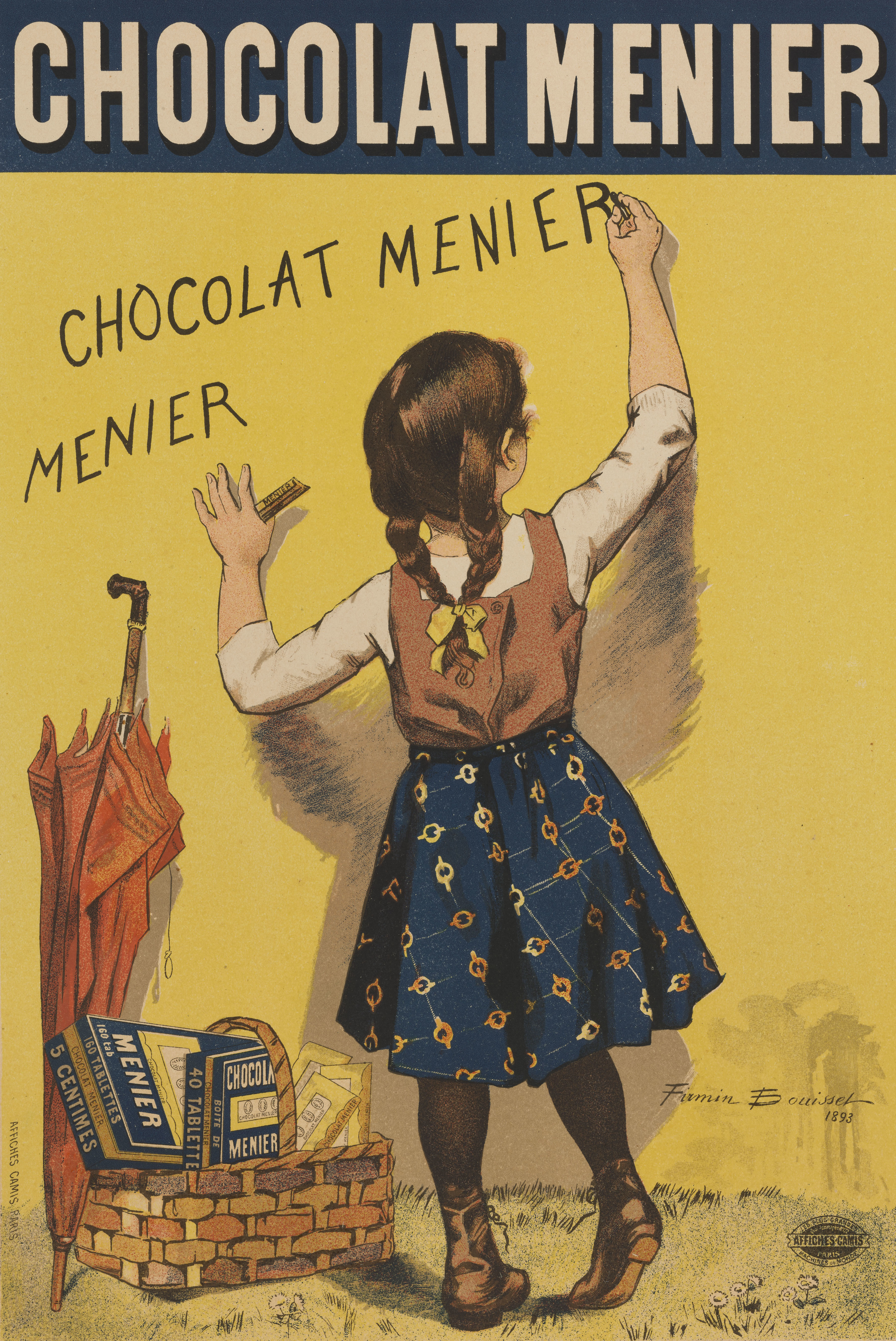
1893 poster by Firmin Bouisset

In 1893 the company began using advertising posters created by Firmin Bouisset featuring a little girl using a piece of chocolate to write the name Chocolat Menier on a wall or window. The small girl's sweet innocence conveyed the sweet chocolate message through her "chocolate graffiti". It proved to be a highly successful image and became an internationally recognized symbol. Firmin Bouisset's image of the little girl would be featured on Menier's packaged products as well as on promotional items such as reusable tin ware, creamers, bowls, sugar dishes, plates, canister sets, and even children's exercise books. Original Menier posters and assorted products as well as reproductions are still much in demand today.

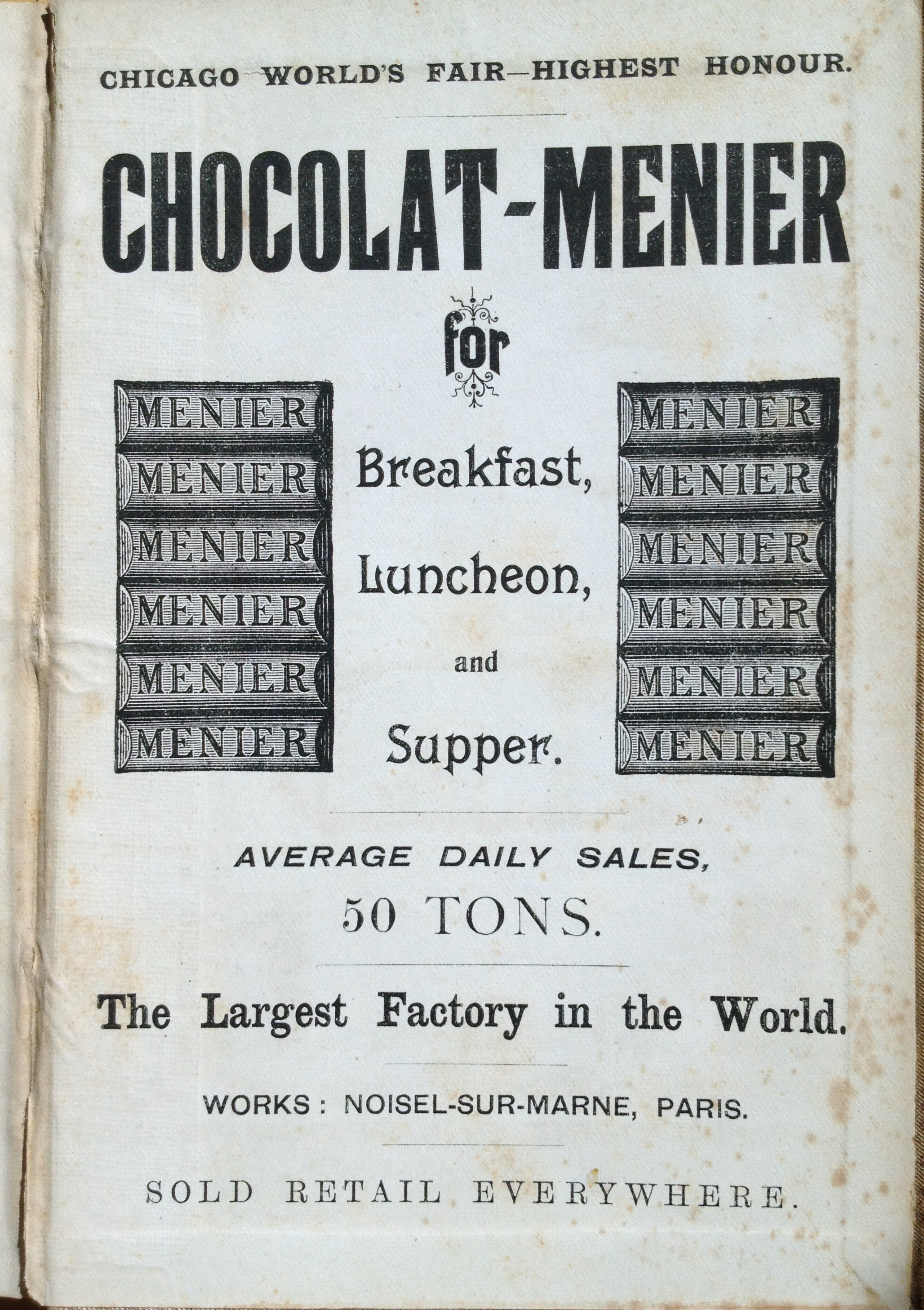
Menier's advertisement, London, 1894

As part of its sales strategy, Menier introduced small dark chocolate sticks to be inserted into a piece of bread. To raise their profile and sell more product, on sidewalks in towns and cities all over France, the company set up "chocolate kiosques". Their hexagon shape and peaked roof became the standard for newspaper kiosques. Such was their popularity that for children, the company made plastic model kiosks as toy dispensers filled with tiny chocolate bars.

With their growing international presence, the Menier Chocolate Company exhibited at the 1893 World's Fair in Chicago where they were billed as the leading chocolate makers in the world. As the business continued to prosper, at the turn of the 20th century, more additions to the Noisiel plant were made including a major building that was one of the first to use reinforced concrete and, because of its appearance, was soon dubbed by locals as the "Cathedral." In addition, the company built Pont Hardi, a 44.5m long concrete bridge, a record at the time, across the Marne River to link the new building to the other plants.

=== Decline and present day ===
World War I marked the beginning of the decline of the Menier Chocolate company. While Europe was in turmoil and businesses there suffered greatly, rapid expansion was taking place in neutral Switzerland and in the United States. Companies there were untouched by the ravages of the war, and benefited from the influx of refugees that increased market size and provided labor necessary for expansion. While the war raged in France for four years, a Swiss company was able to introduce the first chocolates with a filling. By the end of the war, Menier's finances had been weakened while competition and technologies had substantially increased.

Gaston Menier died in 1934 and the onset of World War II five years later exacerbated the company's problems to an even greater extent. It was then run by Hubert and Antoine Menier, and neither had the capacity to deal with the problems. Despite the Menier Chocolate company's strong brand recognition and an effective marketing of children's books utilizing the fables of Jean de La Fontaine, by the 1950s the industry leader in France was being swamped by its competitors, rapidly losing market share and considerable amounts of money.

In 1957 Menier Chocolate absorbed the Lombart Chocolate company. Hubert Menier died in 1959 and Antoine would be the last Menier to run the business. Entering the 1960s, the Menier workforce dropped to just over 250 from its peak of more than 2,000.

In 1960, the Menier company had no choice but to find a buyer and was merged with the Cacao Barry company; by 1965 the Menier family no longer held an interest in the company. The Menier factory was sold to Group Ufico-Perrier which became part of British confectioners Rowntree Mackintosh in 1971 who in turn was acquired in 1988 by the Swiss food and beverage giant Nestlé S.A.

In the early 1990s, all production ceased at the Noisiel facility but in 1996, Nestlé France opened its headquarters in the main building while other buildings in the complex are now part of a chocolate museum with tours open to the public. The Menier Chocolate Factory building on Southwark Street in London is now a popular arts complex that incorporates an art gallery, restaurant, and theatre.

Today, Menier continues to sell a limited range of chocolate that can be purchased online through their official website and affiliated retailers.

=== London Factory ===
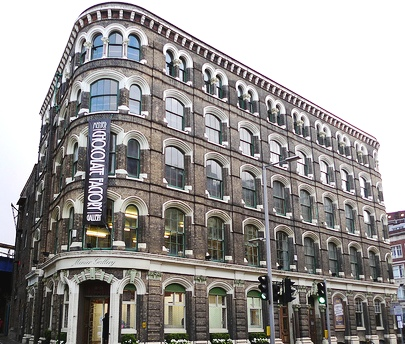
The Menier Chocolate Factory in Southwark, London (now an arts venue)

The Menier company expanded overseas and built a five-storey factory and warehouse of brick with stone dressings in Southwark, London, between 1865 and 1874. It was listed Grade II in 1996 and continued to operate as a chocolate factory until the 1980s when it was closed down.

The building was left derelict for several years and since 2004 has been home to a performing arts theatre, the Menier Chocolate Factory.

== Corporate affairs ==
=== Leadership ===
Controlled and run by the Menier family for more than 150 years, the early heads of Menier Chocolate company were:

- Antoine Brutus Menier (1795–1853), founder
- Emile-Justin Menier (1826–81), sole CEO
- Gaston Menier (1855–1934), COO
- Henri Menier (1853–1913), CEO
- Hubert Menier (1910–59), co chief executive with Antoine
- Antoine Gilles Menier (1904–67), last CEO

=== Ownership ===
- 1960 the company merged with Cacao Barry.
- 1971 Noisiel factory was sold to Group Ufico-Perrier which became part of British confectioners Rowntree Mackintosh.
- 1988 Rowntree Mackintosh was acquired by the Swiss food and drinks company Nestle.

== See also ==
- Anticosti Island
- Château de Chenonceau
- Port-Menier, Quebec
- Valle Menier, Nandaime
