= Minier =

Minier is a French surname.

== Origin ==
In French, the word means mining, in the sense of pertaining or related to mining.

== Notable people ==
Notable people with this surname include:

- Christine Minier (born 1964), French singer
- Daniel D. Minier (1794–1849), American soldier
- Ethan B. Minier (1874–1958), American politician
- Karen Minier (born 1973), Belgian television presenter
- Nelson Minier, pseudonym of Adrien Stoutenburg (1916–1982), American writer
- Theodore L. Minier (1819–1895), American politician

== See also ==
- Menier
- Meunier
- Mounier
- Munier
