= Michel Meunier =

Canadian engineer

- Education: Polytechnique Montréal, Massachusetts Institute of Technology
- Scientific career
- Fields: Engineering physics and Biomedical engineering
- Workplaces: Polytechnique Montréal
- Website: lp2l.polymtl.ca

Michel Meunier is a professor of engineering physics and biomedical engineering at Polytechnique Montréal, a position has he held since 1986. He was recently the acting director of the Department of Engineering Physics from 2019 to 2020. He is the director of the Laser Processing and Plasmonics Laboratory (LP2L), which he founded in 1988, whose mission is to develop diagnostic and therapeutic technologies based on plasmonics and the optical properties of colloidal nanoparticles.

== University education ==
Meunier received his B.Eng. and M.A.Sc. in engineering physics from Polytechnique Montréal in 1978 and 1980, respectively, and his doctorate from the Massachusetts Institute of Technology in 1984.

== Career ==
Michel Meunier has been a professor of Engineering Physics at Polytechnique Montréal since 1986 and was the interim director of the Department of Engineering Physics for the years 2019/2020.

== Research ==
Holder of a Canada Research Chair from 2002 to 2016, Meunier is recognized for his research in the field of nanotechnology and laser-matter interaction for medical applications. He is notably one of the developers of optoporation, which consists of carrying out cell gene transfection using an ultra-fast pulsed laser (femtosecond laser) and of plasmonic nanoparticles, typically gold or gold-silver alloy.

The activities of his laboratory, the LP2L, mainly focuses on four research axes:

- Femtosecond engineering
- Biomedical nanophotonics
- Plasmonic nanobiomarker imaging
- Laser nanosurgery

== Entrepreneurship ==
- Meunier is one of the cofounders of the company LTRIM Technologies, Inc., founded in 1998. Notably, LTRIM Technologies has commercialized a new laser trimming technique for analog circuits.
- Meunier is a joint holder of a patent granted in 2015 for the chemical synthesis of spherical gold-silver alloy nanoparticles used as biomarkers.
- He is also one of the cofounders of the start-up VEGA BioImaging in 2021, which specializes in the detection and characterization of plasmonic nanoparticles in solution or in a cellular environment.

== Prizes and distinctions ==
- 1989: Prize for research and teaching awarded by the Director General of Polytechnique Montréal
- 2002 - 2009: Canada Research Chair
- 2007: Synergy Prize awarded by the Natural Sciences and Engineering Research Council of Canada for innovation and exceptional industry collaboration. This award recognizes his participation in the founding of LTRIM technologies, a company that commercialized a new laser trimming technique for analog circuits.
- 2009–present: Fellow of the Canadian Academy of Engineering, awarded in particular for his contributions in the field of laser technology.
- 2010: Fellow of the Society of Photo-Optical Instrumentation Engineers (SPIE)
- 2012: Fellow of the Optical Society (OSA)
- 2009 - 2016: Renewal of the Canada Research Chair
- 2016: Prix Guy Rocher awarded by the Ministry of Education of Quebec for his exceptional qualifications in university teaching in Quebec
