= Noisiel =

- Commune
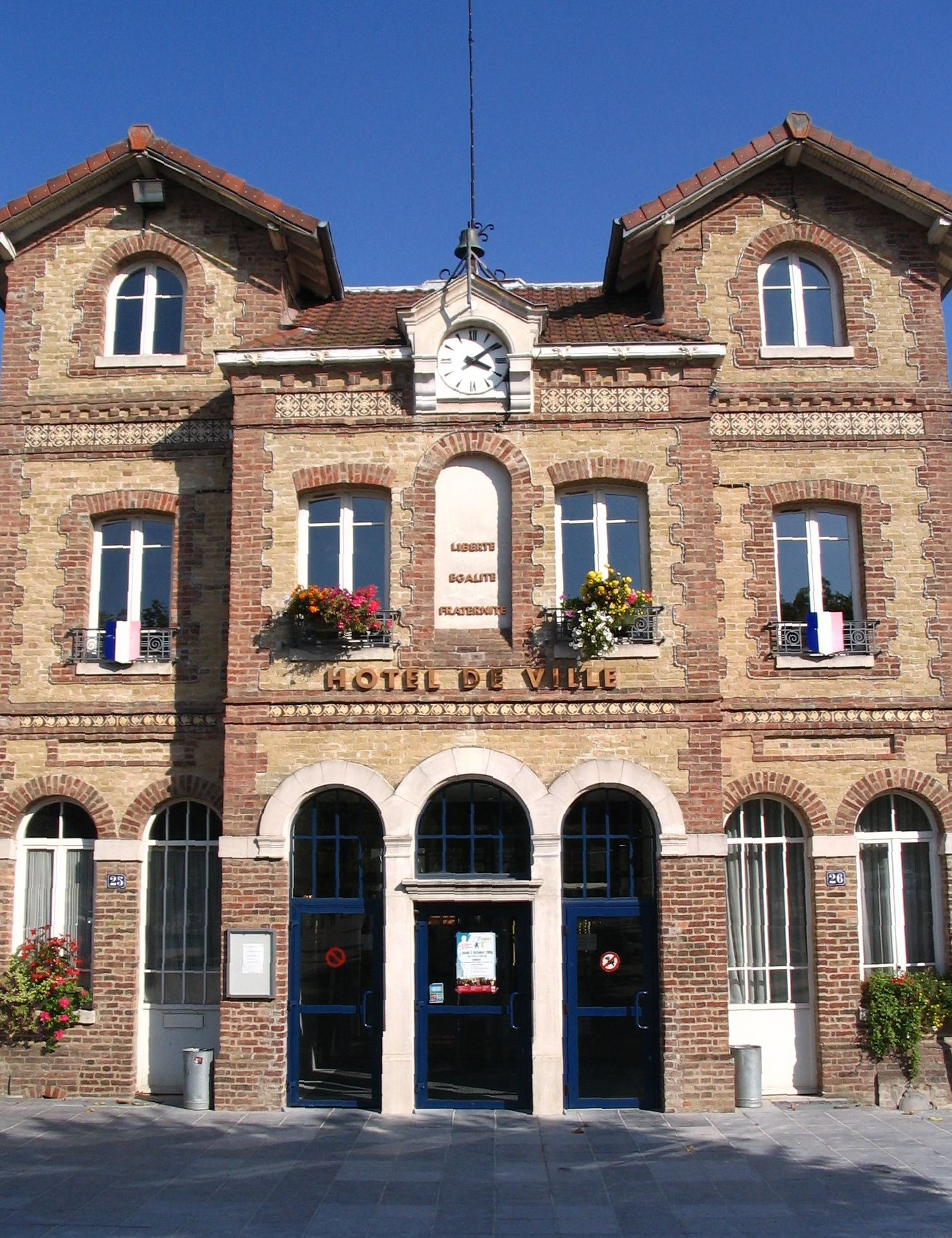
- Town Hall

- Coat of arms

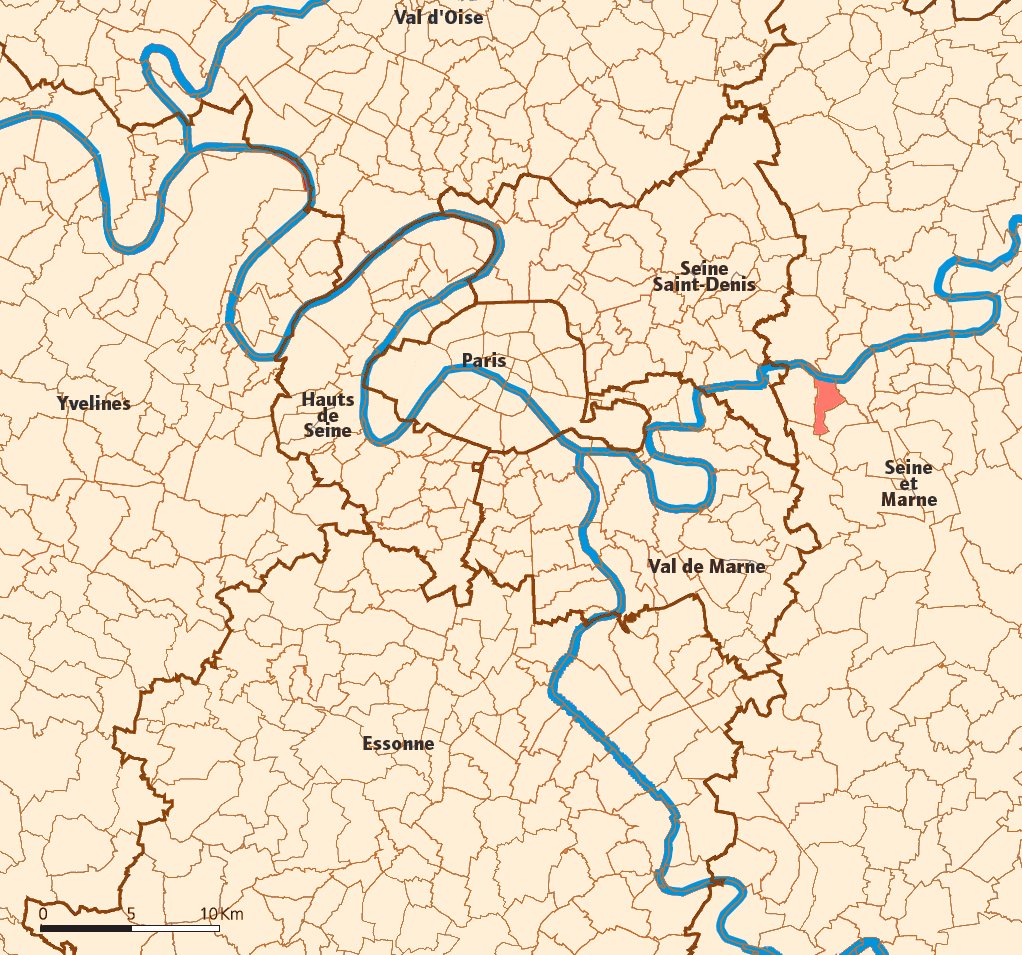
- Location (in red) within Paris inner and outer suburbs
- Location of Noisiel
- Location within France Location within Île-de-France (region)
- Coordinates: 48°51′17″N 2°37′44″E
- Country: France
- Region: Île-de-France
- Department: Seine-et-Marne
- Arrondissement: Torcy
- Canton: Champs-sur-Marne
- Intercommunality: CA Paris - Vallée de la Marne

Government
  - Mayor (2020–2026): Mathieu Viskovic
- Area^{1}: 4.35 km^{2} (1.68 sq mi)
- Highest elevation: 109 m (358 ft)
- Lowest elevation: 38 m (125 ft)
- Population (2023): 16,053
  - Density: 3,690/km^{2} (9,560/sq mi)
- Time zone: UTC+01:00 (CET)
  - Summer (DST): UTC+02:00 (CEST)
- INSEE/Postal code: 77337 /77186
- ^{1} French Land Register data, which excludes lakes, ponds, glaciers > 1 km^{2} (0.386 sq mi or 247 acres) and river estuaries.

Noisiel (French pronunciation: [nwazjɛl]) is a commune in the French department of Seine-et-Marne, administrative region of Île-de-France. It is located in the eastern suburbs of Paris, 20.5 km (12.7 mi) from the center of Paris.

The commune of Noisiel is part of the Val Maubuée sector, one of the four sectors in the "new town" of Marne-la-Vallée.

== Demographics ==
Inhabitants of Noisiel are called Noisiéliens. The population of Noisiel increased sharply in the 1970s, and has since stabilised around 15,000 inhabitants. As of 1998, 8% of the population was Asian and certain parts of the commune had high Asian populations.

Historical population
| Year | Pop. | ±% p.a. |
|---|---|---|
| 1968 | 1,274 | — |
| 1975 | 3,571 | +15.86% |
| 1982 | 12,446 | +19.53% |
| 1990 | 16,525 | +3.61% |
| 1999 | 15,502 | −0.71% |
| 2007 | 15,429 | −0.06% |
| 2012 | 15,625 | +0.25% |
| 2017 | 15,230 | −0.51% |
| 2023 | 16,053 | +0.88% |
Source: INSEE

== Transportation ==
Noisiel is served by Noisiel station on Paris RER line.

== Menier chocolate ==
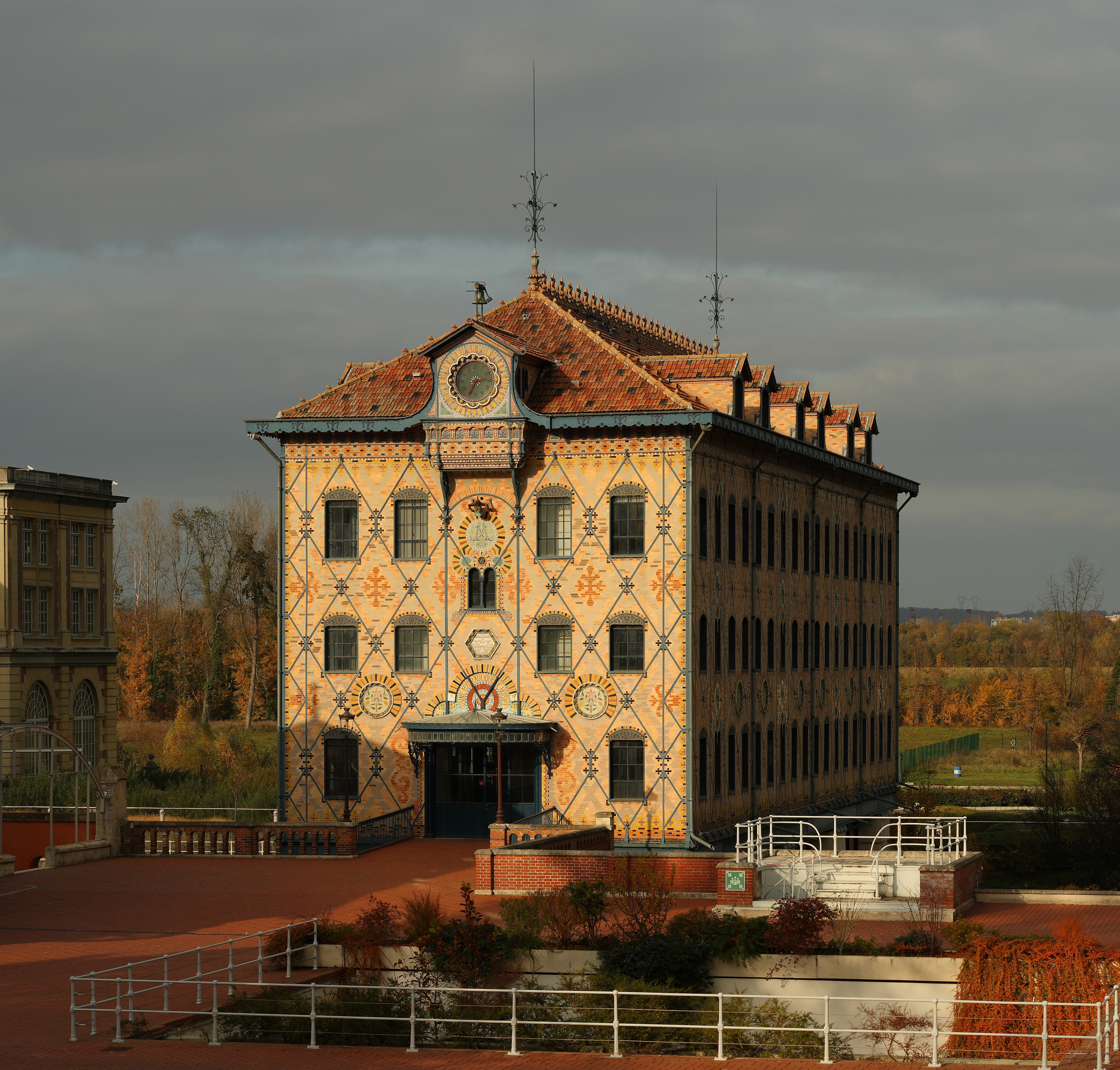
Saulnier Mill, in the Menier Chocolate Factory

Noisiel is synonymous with the name "Menier", famous chocolate makers who built the first automated chocolate production facility in 1825 at a time when the village's inhabitants numbered around 200. The Menier company would prosper and in the 1870s built a complete "town" to accommodate its employees that numbered more than 2000 by the end of the 19th century.

Members of the Menier family were mayors of Noisiel without interruption from May 11, 1871, to November 8, 1959.

- Emile-Justin Menier (1871 to 1881)
- Henri Menier (1881 to 1913)
- Gaston Menier (1913 to 1933)
- Jacques Menier (1934 to 1945)
- Antoine Gilles Menier (1945 to 1959)

The Menier Chocolate factory operated until 1993 and today is a museum and the French head office of the Nestlé company who now own the company. It has been designated by the government of France as a Monument historique and is on the tentative list to be named a UNESCO World Heritage Site. It is open once a year to visitors during the Open Doors Days in September. The Noisiel heritage office also offers several guided tours for visitors wishing to discover Noisiel and its history.

== Education ==
Noisiel has five groupings of preschools and elementary schools: Allée-des-Bois, Allée des Chevreuils, Bois-de-la-Grange, Ferme-du-Buisson, Jules-Ferry / Maryse-Bastié, Les Noyers, and Les Tilleuls.

Noisiel has one junior high school, Collège du Luzard. There are other nearby junior high schools in Champs-sur-Marne, Emerainville, Lognes, and Torcy.

The commune has two senior high schools/sixth-form colleges:

- Lycée Gérard-de-Nerval
- Lycée René-Cassin

Other senior high/sixth-form establishments in surrounding communes:

- Lycée Émily-Brontë (Lognes)
- Lycée René-Descartes (Champs-sur-Marne)
- Lycée Arche-Guédon (Torcy)
- Lycée Jean-Moulin (Torcy)

== See also ==
- Communes of the Seine-et-Marne department
