= Firmin Bouisset =

French painter

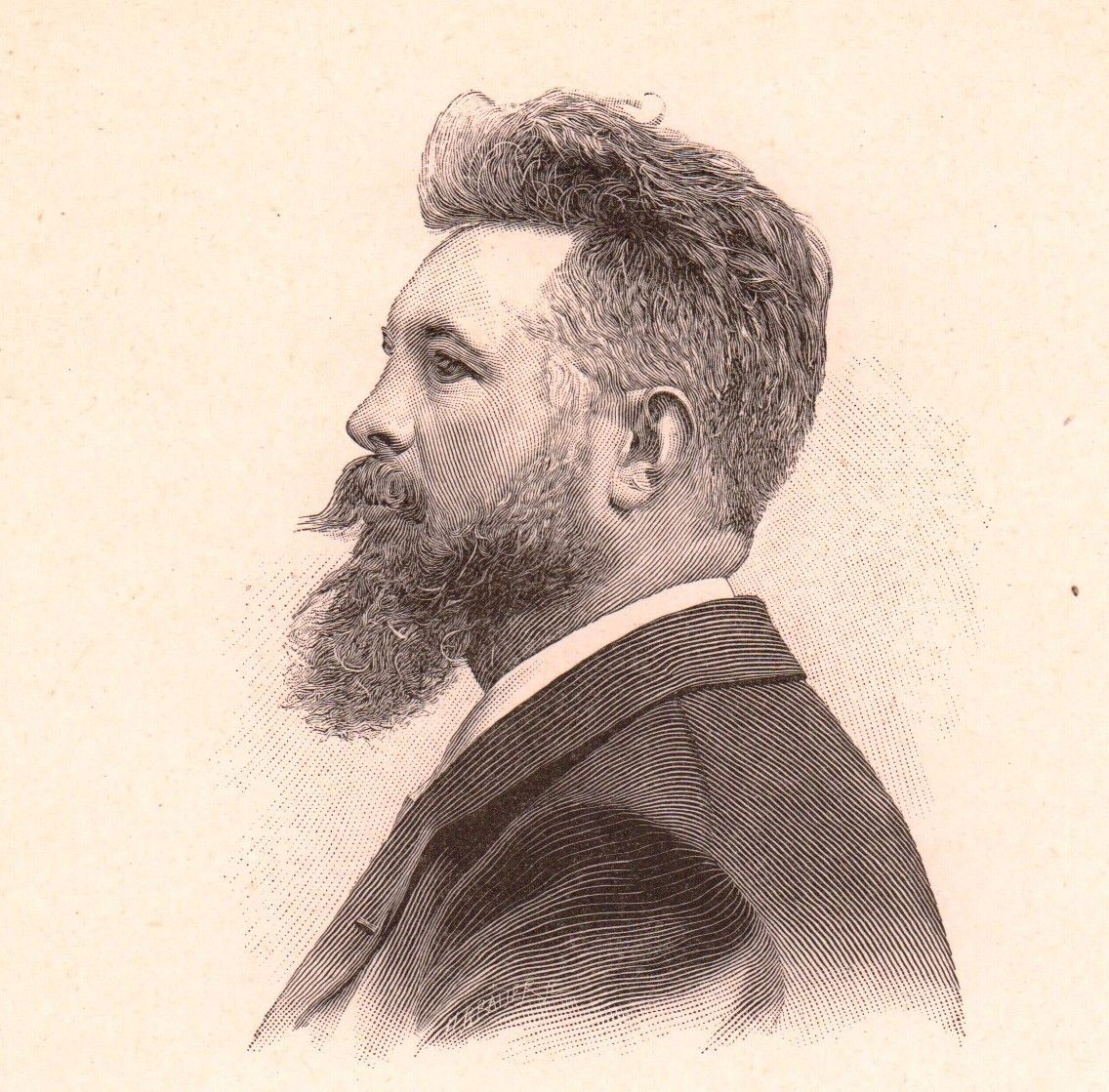
Firmin Bouisset

Firmin Bouisset (2 September 1859 – 19 March 1925) was a French painter, poster artist and printmaker.

== Early life and education ==
He was born on 2 September 1859 in the town of Moissac in the Tarn-et-Garonne département in southwestern France. Firmin Bouisset entered the Toulouse School of Fine Arts in 1877, in the live model class. He then passed the Beaux-Arts de Paris competition in March 1880 in Alexandre Cabanel's class, and exhibited two portraits painted the same year at the Salon des artistes français. In 1883, at the request of the director of the Sarreguemines earthenware factory, he executed drawings to decorate a service and were noticed. As an artist, Bouisset specialized in painting children subjects and did a number of illustrated books such as La Petite Ménagère (The Little Housekeeper) in 1890.

== Career ==
Advertising poster by Bouisset, "Maggi Arome Pour Corser" circa 1895.

At a time when posters were a popular form of advertising, Bouisset created posters with enduring images for a number of different French food companies such as Maggi and Lefèvre-Utile. For the latter company, he used their LU initials as an ad logo as part of an 1897 poster image for a line of butter biscuits featuring Petit Ecolier ("The Little Schoolboy"). A variation is still being used by the company today.

In 1892, Bouisset was contracted by French chocolate manufacturer Menier for an advertising poster. He used his daughter Yvonne as a model to create what became an iconic image of a little girl using a piece of chocolate to write the company's name. The drawing was featured on a great many of the Menier company's advertisements and on its packaged products as well as on promotional items such as creamers, bowls, sugar dishes, plates, canister sets, ashtrays, thermometers, key chains, and even children's exercise books.

Bouisset's work was part of the Maîtres de l'Affiche as well as L'Estampe Moderne, the leading publisher of original French prints during the late nineteenth century. Today, many of his posters are very popular with collectors. Because they are no longer copyright protected, they are often duplicated and sold on the Internet and in retail outlets in many countries.

Firmin Bouisset died in Paris on 19 March 1925.
