= Lycée Camille Claudel (Vauréal) =

School in France

Lycée Camille Claudel is a senior high school in Vauréal, Val-d'Oise, France, in the Paris metropolitan area.
