= Vauréal =

- Commune
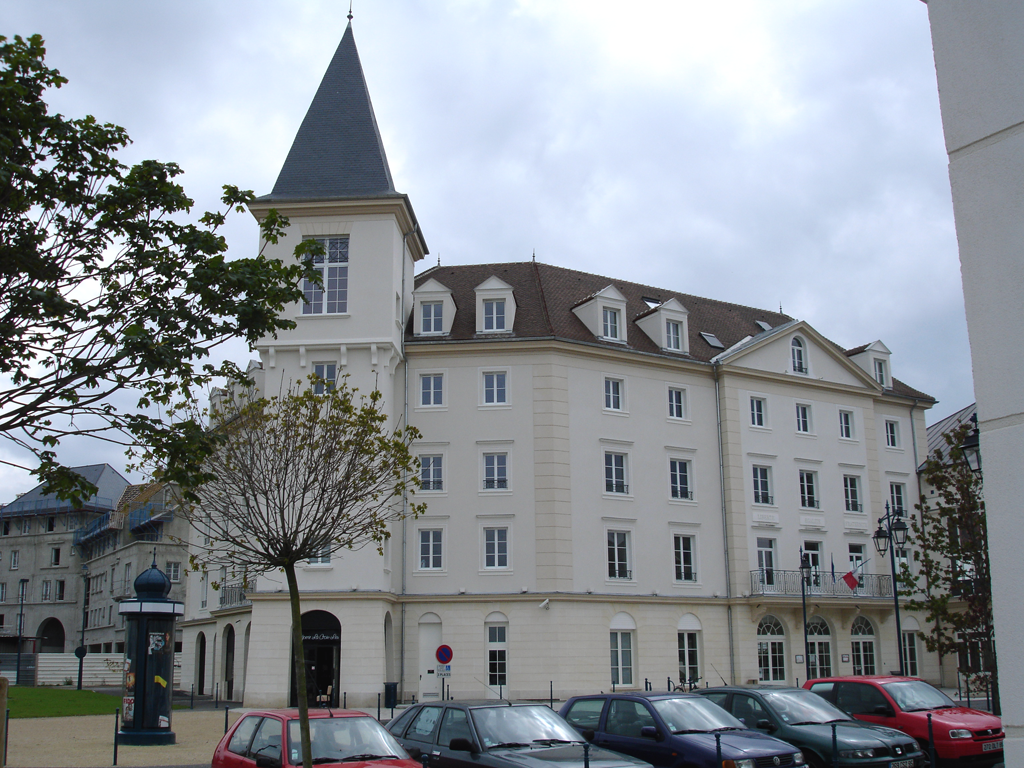
- Town hall

- Coat of arms

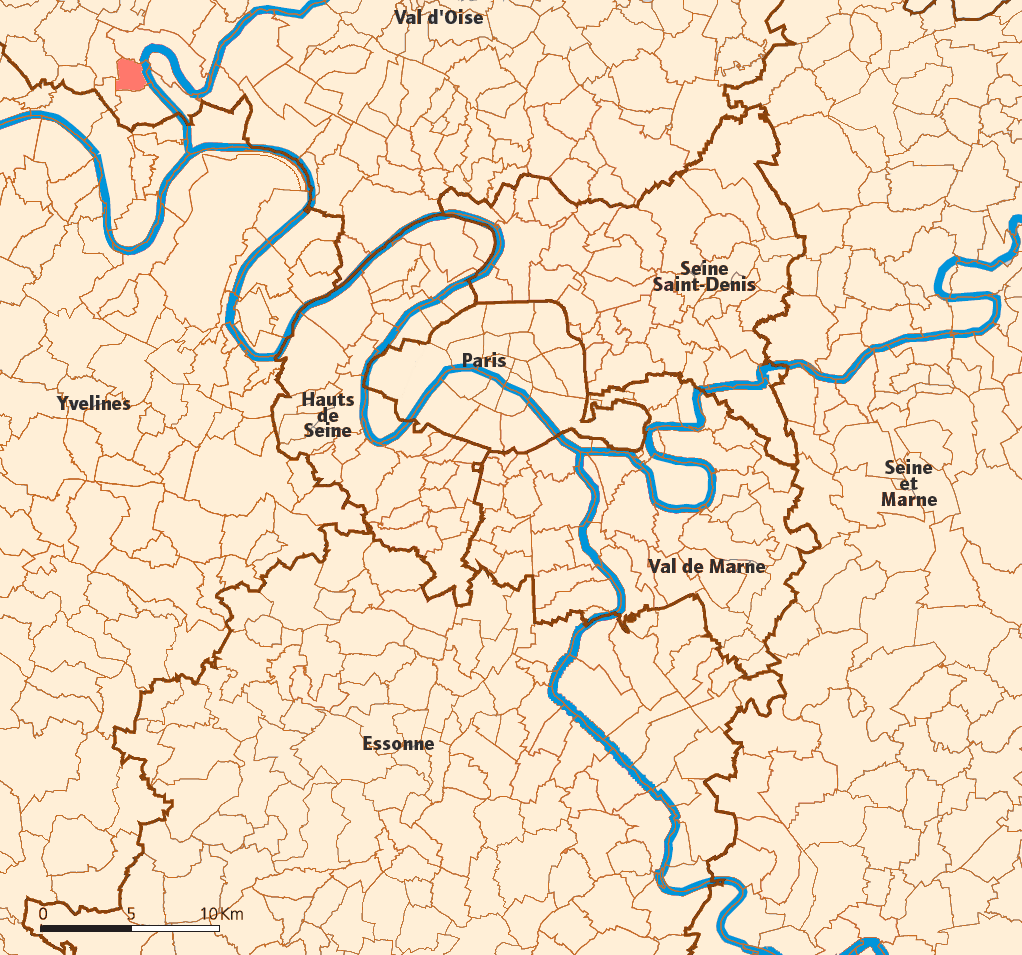
- Location (in red) within Paris inner and outer suburbs
- Location of Vauréal
- Location within France Location within Île-de-France (region)
- Coordinates: 49°02′07″N 2°01′58″E
- Country: France
- Region: Île-de-France
- Department: Val-d'Oise
- Arrondissement: Pontoise
- Canton: Vauréal
- Intercommunality: Cergy-Pontoise

Government
  - Mayor (2023–2026): Raphaël Lanteri
- Area^{1}: 3.46 km^{2} (1.34 sq mi)
- Highest elevation: 122 m (400 ft)
- Lowest elevation: 22 m (72 ft)
- Population (2023): 16,079
  - Density: 4,650/km^{2} (12,000/sq mi)
- Time zone: UTC+01:00 (CET)
  - Summer (DST): UTC+02:00 (CEST)
- INSEE/Postal code: 95637 /95490
- ^{1} French Land Register data, which excludes lakes, ponds, glaciers > 1 km^{2} (0.386 sq mi or 247 acres) and river estuaries.

Vauréal (French pronunciation: [voʁeal]) is a commune in the northwestern suburbs of Paris, France. It is located 30.6 km (19.0 mi) from the center of Paris, in the "new town" of Cergy-Pontoise, created in the 1960s.

French chocolate maker Henri Menier (1853–1913) had a château in Vauréal and named the 70-metre-high Vauréal Falls on Anticosti Island in Quebec province of Canada after the town.

== Population ==
Historical population
Year	Pop.	±% p.a.
1968	607	—
1975	662	+1.25%
1982	866	+3.91%
1990	12,045	+38.97%
1999	16,206	+3.35%
2007	15,674	−0.42%
2012	15,868	+0.25%
2017	16,464	+0.74%
2023	16,079	−0.39%
Source: INSEE

== Transportation ==
Vauréal is served by no station of the Paris Métro, RER, or suburban rail network. The closest station to Vauréal is Cergy-le-Haut station on Paris RER line A and on the Transilien Paris-Saint-Lazare suburban rail line. This station is located in the neighboring commune of Cergy, 2.2 km (1.4 mi) from the town center of Vauréal.

== Education ==
Schools include:

- Eight primary schools
- Two junior high schools (collèges): La Bussie and Les Toupets
- One senior high school, Lycée Camille Claudel

== See also ==
- Communes of the Val-d'Oise department
