= Pascal Meunier (diplomat) =

French diplomat

Pascal Meunier, born 19 March 1953 in Trélon near Maubeuge, is a French diplomat. He served as the ambassador of France to Azerbaijan and to Georgia.

== Biography ==
Meunier graduated from the Institut d'Études Politiques de Paris (Sciences Po) and the National Institute of Oriental Languages and Civilizations (Russian and Japanese), Pascal Meunier joined the Ministry of Foreign Affairs in 1973.

After serving in the French embassies in Tokyo, Prague, Warsaw and Stockholm, he held various positions at Quai d'Orsay, including the direction of Europe and the direction of Asia and Oceania.

After working at the Ministry of Industry as Head of International Affairs to the Department of Petroleum and the Ministry of Economy and Finance, where he is the diplomatic adviser Bruno Durieux, Minister of Foreign Trade, Pascal Meunier was delegated to Thomson-CSF (now Thales) in 1993 as Director of foreign and multilateral funding.

In 1996 he became director for international financial affairs of the Thales Group and director in charge of the group's relations with European organizations and bodies. He became then Senior vice president, International Development Director. He is a member of the board of EuroDéfense France.

On 7 March 2012, he was appointed ambassador of France to Azerbaijan. On 4 March 2016, he was appointed ambassador of France to Georgia and held the post until August 2019.
