= Magny-en-Vexin =

- Commune
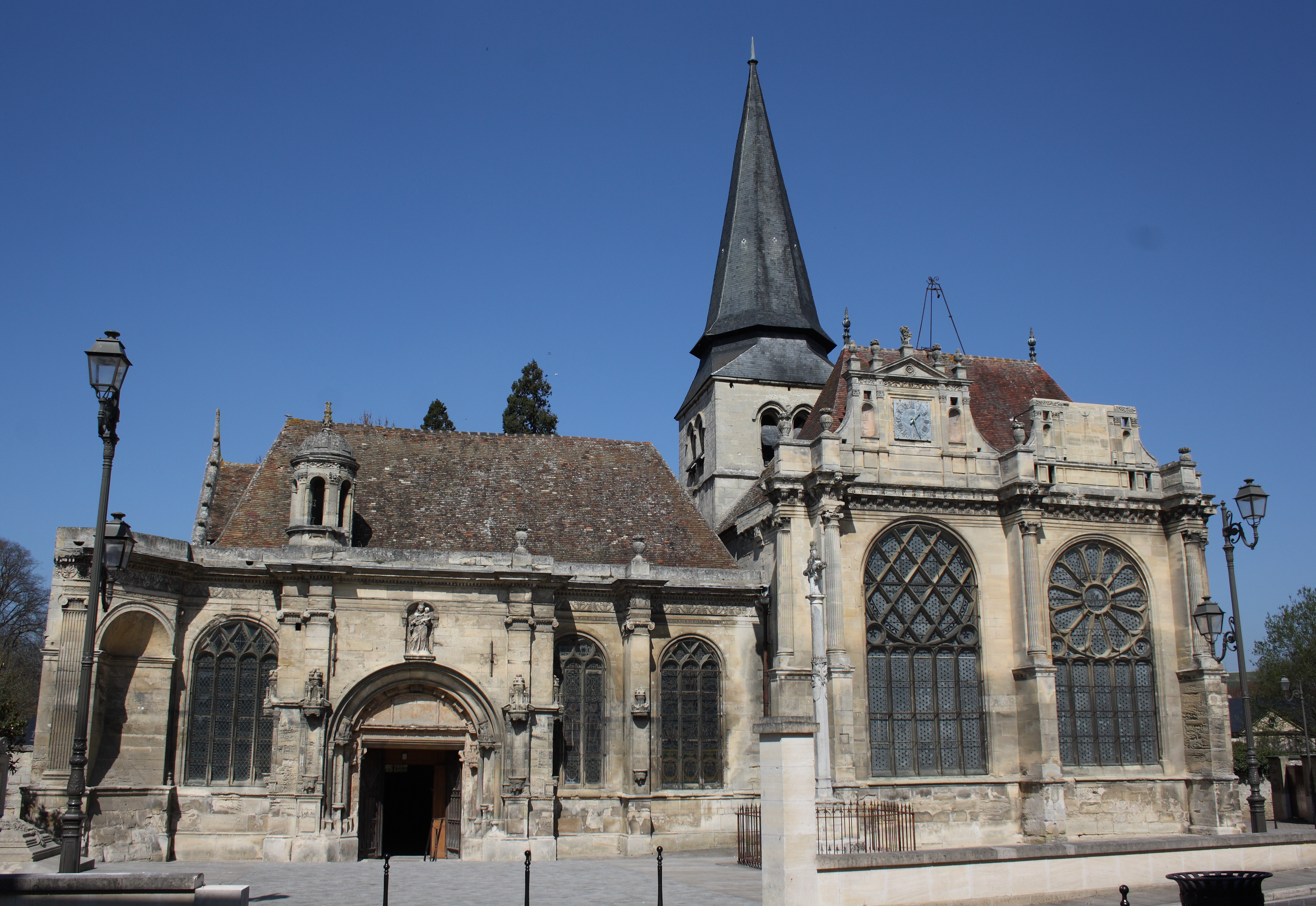
- The church of Our Lady of the Nativity, in Magny-en-Vexin

- Coat of arms
- Location of Magny-en-Vexin
- Location within France Location within Île-de-France (region)
- Coordinates: 49°09′18″N 1°47′15″E
- Country: France
- Region: Île-de-France
- Department: Val-d'Oise
- Arrondissement: Pontoise
- Canton: Vauréal

Government
  - Mayor (2020–2026): Luc Puech d'Alissac
- Area^{1}: 14.02 km^{2} (5.41 sq mi)
- Highest elevation: 149 m (489 ft)
- Lowest elevation: 63 m (207 ft)
- Population (2023): 5,779
  - Density: 412.2/km^{2} (1,068/sq mi)
- Time zone: UTC+01:00 (CET)
  - Summer (DST): UTC+02:00 (CEST)
- INSEE/Postal code: 95355 /95420
- ^{1} French Land Register data, which excludes lakes, ponds, glaciers > 1 km^{2} (0.386 sq mi or 247 acres) and river estuaries.

Magny-en-Vexin (French pronunciation: [maɲi ɑ̃ vɛksɛ̃], literally Magny in Vexin) is a commune in the Val-d'Oise département in Île-de-France in northern France. It is located in the regional nature park of Vexin.

== Population ==
Historical population
Year	Pop.	±% p.a.
1968	3,423	—
1975	4,077	+2.53%
1982	4,558	+1.61%
1990	5,050	+1.29%
1999	5,656	+1.27%
2007	5,508	−0.33%
2012	5,763	+0.91%
2017	5,653	−0.38%
2023	5,779	+0.37%
Source: INSEE

== Education ==
Public schools:

- Groupe Scolaire de l'Aubette: École Maternelle Albert Schweitzer and École Élémentaire Victor Schoelcher- Tél. : 01 34 67 27 60
- Groupe Scolaire du Centre: École Maternelle Paul Eluard and École Élémentaire Anne Frank
- École Élémentaire Jean Moulin is in the Regroupement scolaire des quartiers d'Arthieul et de Blamécourt
- One junior high school, Collège Claude Monet.

École Maternelle et Elémentaire Marie-Thérèse/Collège Marie Thérèse is a private school in the commune.

Public high schools in the vicinity:

- Lycée Jules Verne - Cergy
- Lycée Polyvalent Galilée - Cergy
- Lycée d’Enseignement Professionnel de Chars - Chars
- Lycée d’Enseignement Professionnel d’Éragny - Éragny
- Lycée Polyvalent de Jouy le Moutier - Jouy le Moutier
- Lycée Polyvalent d'Osny - Osny
- Lycée Alfred Kastler de Cergy-Pontoise - Pontoise
- Lycée Camille Pissarro - Pontoise
- Lycée Technique Jean Perrin - Saint Ouen l'Aumône
- Lycée Professionnel Industriel d'Epluches - Saint Ouen l'Aumône
- Lycée Camille Claudel - Vauréal

Private high schools in the vicinity (all in Pontoise):

- Lycée Notre Dame de la Compassion
- Lycée Vauban
- École Saint Martin de France

== See also ==
- Vexin
- Communes of the Val-d'Oise department
- Chipping Norton, twin town of Magny-en-Vexin.
