= Puiseux-Pontoise =

- Commune
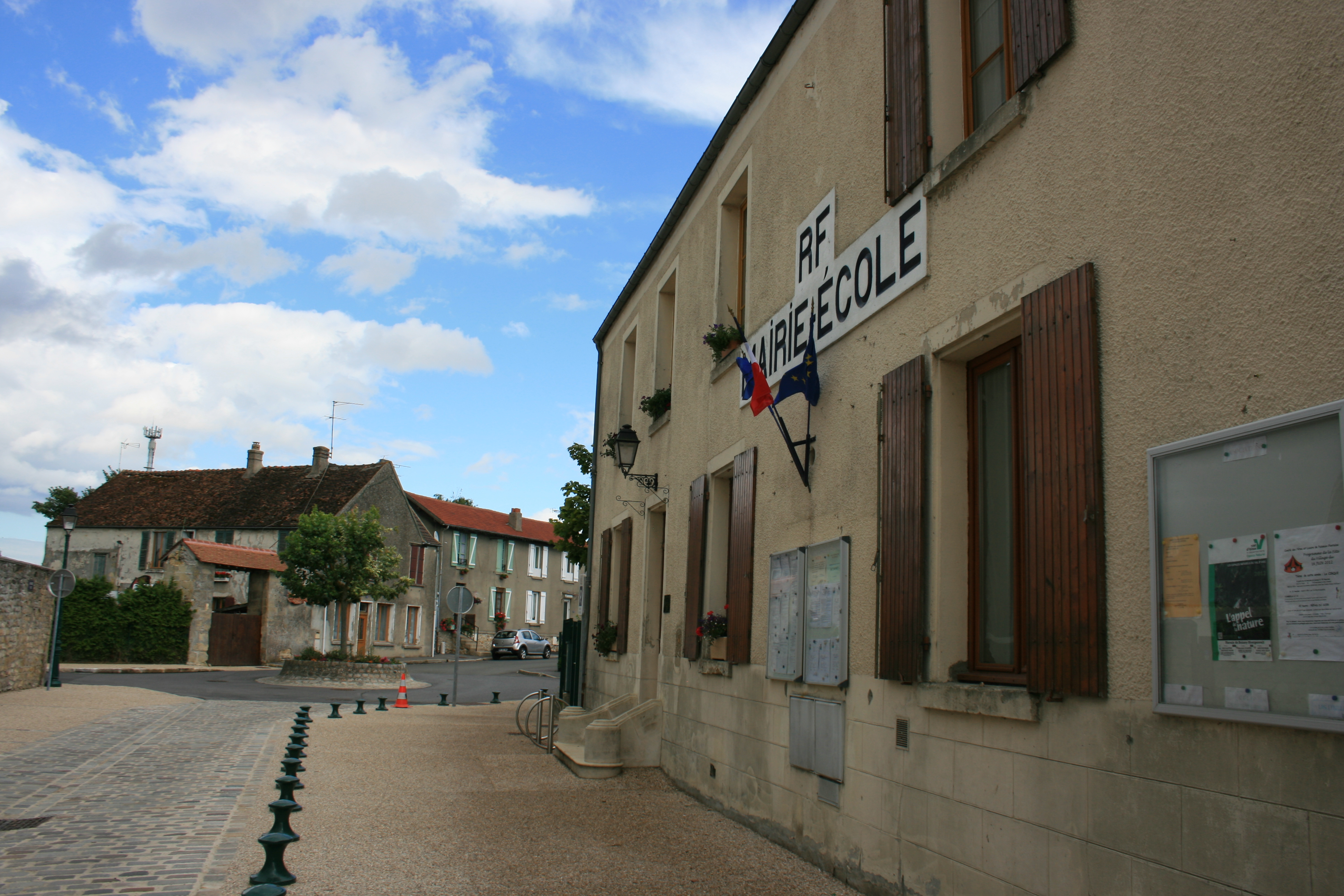
- The town hall and school of Puiseux-Pontoise
- Location of Puiseux-Pontoise
- Location within France Location within Île-de-France (region)
- Coordinates: 49°03′27″N 2°01′18″E
- Country: France
- Region: Île-de-France
- Department: Val-d'Oise
- Arrondissement: Pontoise
- Canton: Cergy-1
- Intercommunality: Cergy-Pontoise

Government
  - Mayor (2020–2026): Thierry Thomassin
- Area^{1}: 5.64 km^{2} (2.18 sq mi)
- Highest elevation: 116 m (381 ft)
- Lowest elevation: 40 m (130 ft)
- Population (2023): 603
  - Density: 107/km^{2} (277/sq mi)
- Time zone: UTC+01:00 (CET)
  - Summer (DST): UTC+02:00 (CEST)
- INSEE/Postal code: 95510 /95650
- ^{1} French Land Register data, which excludes lakes, ponds, glaciers > 1 km^{2} (0.386 sq mi or 247 acres) and river estuaries.

Puiseux-Pontoise (French pronunciation: [pɥizø pɔ̃twaz]) is a commune in the Val-d'Oise department in Île-de-France in northern France.

== Education ==
The commune has a single primary school, école du Vieux Noyer. Junior high school students attend Collège Sainte Appoline in Courdimanche and senior high school students may attend Lycée Jules Verne or Lycée Général et Technologique Galilée, both in Cergy.

== See also ==
- Communes of the Val-d'Oise department
