= Lycée Alfred Kastler de Cergy-Pontoise =

Senior high school in France

Lycée Alfred Kastler de Cergy-Pontoise is a senior high school located in Pontoise, Val-d'Oise, France, in the Paris metropolitan area, serving both Pontoise and Cergy.

It opened on 15 September 1978 as the Lycée de Cergy Ville Nouvelle. It was renamed after Alfred Kastler on 7 February 1989 to its current name.

Students originate from, in addition to Pointoise and Cergy: Éragny, Gency, Herblay, Jouy le Moutier, Magny en Vexin, and Osny. As of 2016 there are 315 students.
