= Courdimanche =

- Commune
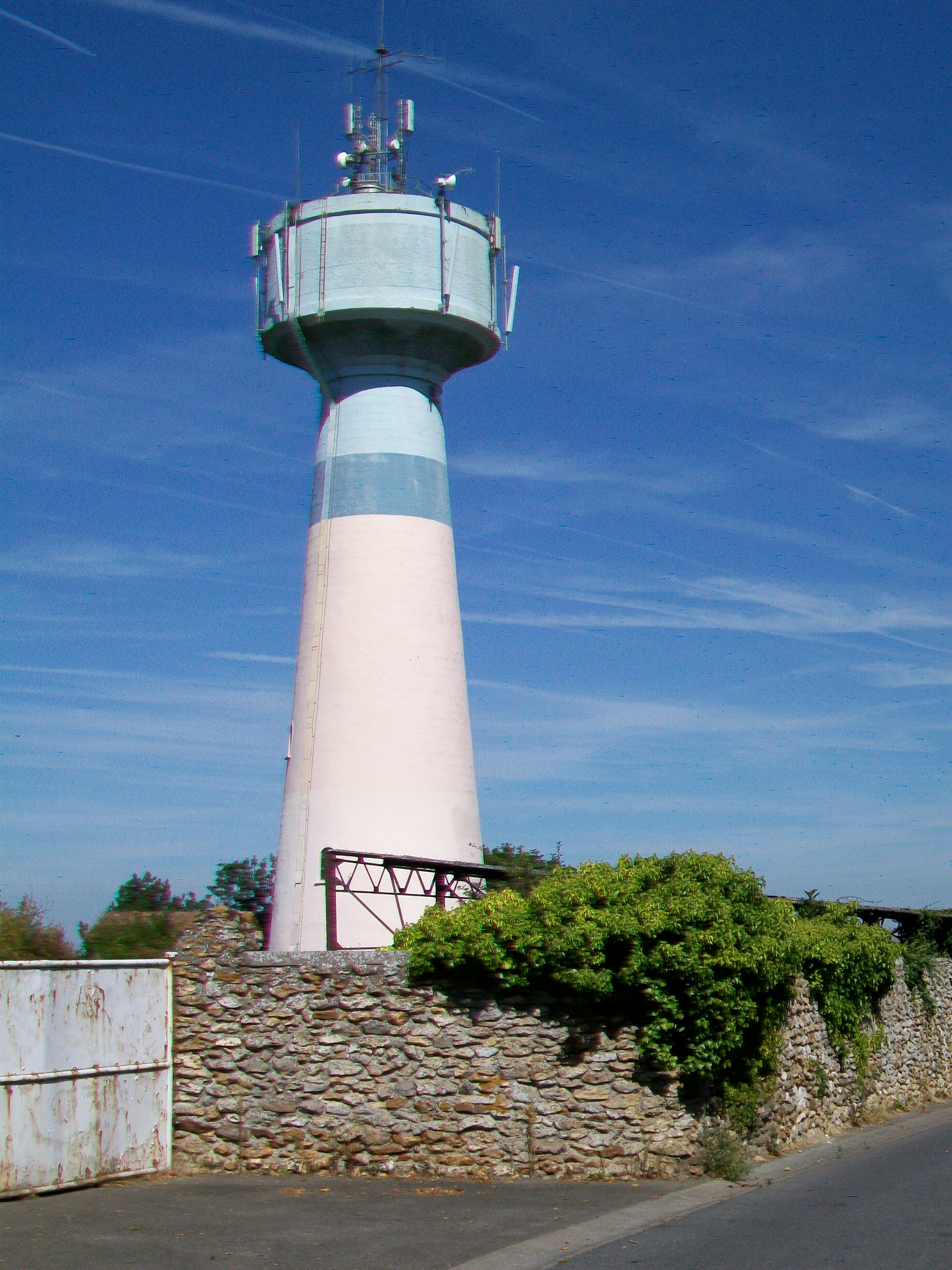
- The water tower in Courdimanche is visible from miles around

- Coat of arms
- Location of Courdimanche
- Location within France Location within Île-de-France (region)
- Coordinates: 49°02′07″N 2°00′08″E
- Country: France
- Region: Île-de-France
- Department: Val-d'Oise
- Arrondissement: Pontoise
- Canton: Vauréal
- Intercommunality: Cergy-Pontoise

Government
  - Mayor (2022–2026): Sophie Matharan
- Area^{1}: 5.54 km^{2} (2.14 sq mi)
- Highest elevation: 160 m (520 ft)
- Lowest elevation: 95 m (312 ft)
- Population (2023): 7,311
  - Density: 1,320/km^{2} (3,420/sq mi)
- Time zone: UTC+01:00 (CET)
  - Summer (DST): UTC+02:00 (CEST)
- INSEE/Postal code: 95183 /95800
- ^{1} French Land Register data, which excludes lakes, ponds, glaciers > 1 km^{2} (0.386 sq mi or 247 acres) and river estuaries.

Courdimanche (French pronunciation: [kuʁdimɑ̃ʃ]) is a commune in the Val-d'Oise department in Île-de-France in northern France.

== Population ==
Historical population
Year	Pop.	±% p.a.
1968	663	—
1975	725	+1.29%
1982	775	+0.96%
1990	1,622	+9.67%
1999	5,957	+15.55%
2007	6,505	+1.11%
2012	6,572	+0.21%
2017	6,681	+0.33%
2023	7,311	+1.51%
Source: INSEE

== Education ==
Schools in the commune include:

- École maternelle les Croizettes (preschool)
- École élémentaire des Croizettes
- Groupe scolaire André Parrain (primary school)
- Groupe scolaire de la Louvière (primary school)
- École privée Saint-Louis
- Collège Sainte-Apolline (junior high school)

Lycée Jules Verne is in nearby Cergy-le-Haut in Cergy.

== See also ==
- Communes of the Val-d'Oise department
