= Canton of Cergy-2 =

Coordinates: 49.03°N 2.08°E

The canton of Cergy-2 is an administrative division of the Val-d'Oise department, Île-de-France region, northern France. It was created at the French canton reorganisation which came into effect in March 2015. Its seat is in Cergy.

It consists of the following communes:

1. Boisemont
2. Cergy (partly)
3. Éragny-sur-Oise
4. Jouy-le-Moutier
5. Neuville-sur-Oise
