= Boisemont, Val-d'Oise =

Boisemont
- Commune
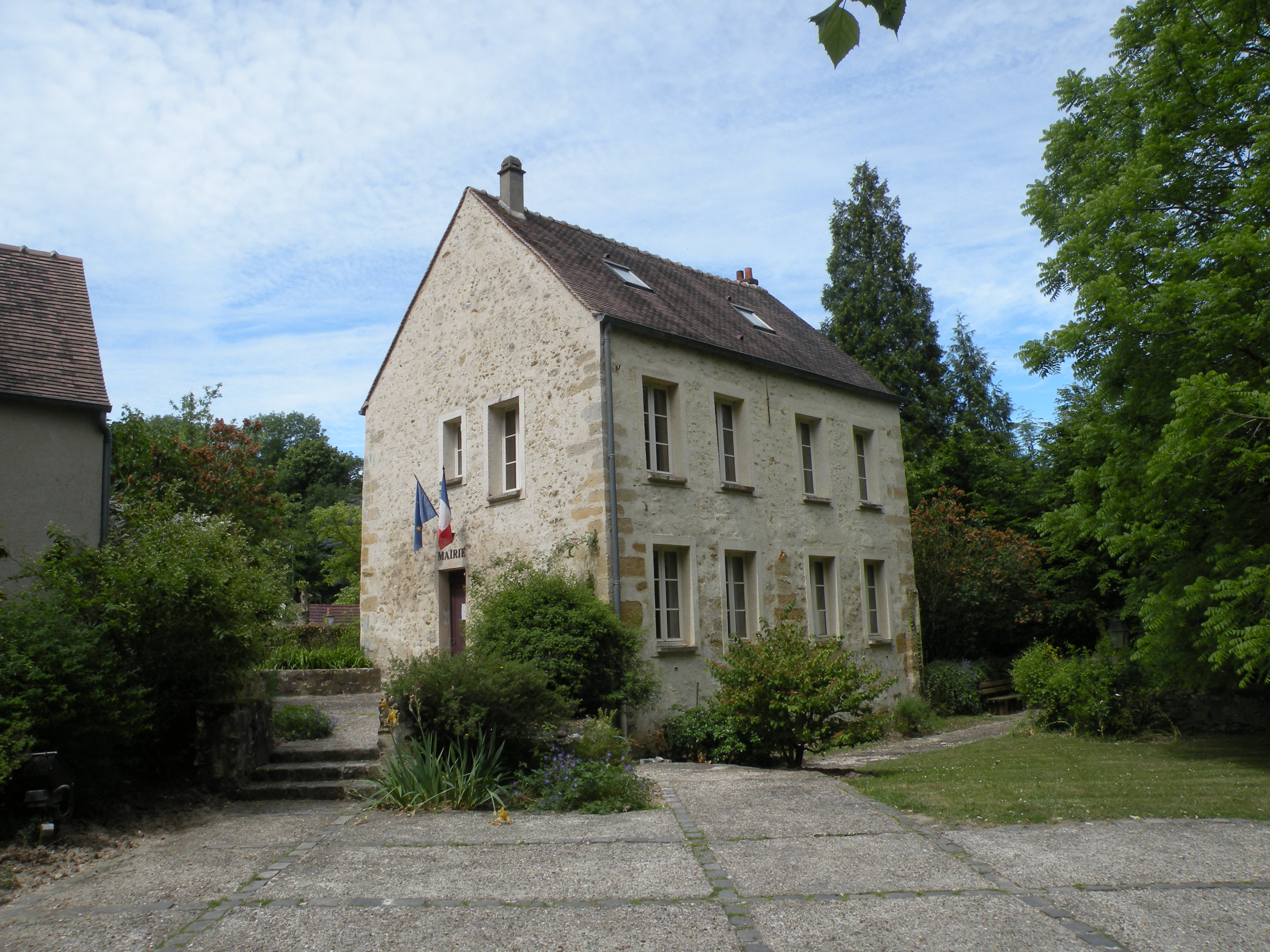
- The town hall of Boisement
- Location of Boisemont
- Location within France Location within Île-de-France (region)
- Coordinates: 49°01′20″N 2°00′09″E
- Country: France
- Region: Île-de-France
- Department: Val-d'Oise
- Arrondissement: Pontoise
- Canton: Cergy-2
- Intercommunality: Cergy-Pontoise

Government
  - Mayor (2020–2026): Stéphanie Savill
- Area^{1}: 2.77 km^{2} (1.07 sq mi)
- Highest elevation: 191 m (627 ft)
- Lowest elevation: 99 m (325 ft)
- Population (2023): 892
  - Density: 322/km^{2} (834/sq mi)
- Time zone: UTC+01:00 (CET)
  - Summer (DST): UTC+02:00 (CEST)
- INSEE/Postal code: 95074 /95000
- ^{1} French Land Register data, which excludes lakes, ponds, glaciers > 1 km^{2} (0.386 sq mi or 247 acres) and river estuaries.

Boisemont (French pronunciation: [bwazmɔ̃]) is a commune in the Val-d'Oise department in Île-de-France in northern France.

== Education ==
There is one municipal primary school, École Chasles Le Roux. As of 2016 it had 56 students. The area secondary schools are Collège La Taillette (junior high school) in Menucourt and Lycée Camille Claudel (senior high school) in Vauréal.

== See also ==
- Communes of the Val-d'Oise department
