= L'enfance d'une ville =

1975 film by Éric Rohmer

- Directed by: Éric Rohmer
- Release date: 1975

"L'Enfance d'une ville" (from the series Villes nouvelles, episode 1) is a 1975 TV documentary by French filmmaker Éric Rohmer about the planning of the new city of Cergy-Pontoise, which was under construction at the time.
