= Cergy-Pontoise =

Coordinates: 49°02′10″N 2°03′47″E

- Communauté d'agglomération
- Location within the Val-d'Oise department
- Country: France
- Region: Île-de-France
- Department: Val-d'Oise, Yvelines
- No. of communes: {{{nbcomm}}}
- Established: 2004
- Area: 84.2 km^{2} (32.5 sq mi)
- Population (2023): 220,279
  - Density: 2,620/km^{2} (6,780/sq mi)
- Website: www.cergypontoise.fr

Cergy-Pontoise (French pronunciation: [sɛʁʒi pɔ̃twɑz]) is a new town and an agglomeration community in France, in the Val-d'Oise and Yvelines departments, northwest of Paris on the river Oise. It owes its name to two of the communes that it covers, Cergy and Pontoise. Its population is 220,279 (2023), in an area of 84.2 km^{2}. Created in the 1970s, it became an agglomeration community in 2004.

== Composition ==
As of 2022, the communauté d'agglomération Cergy-Pontoise consists of thirteen communes:

- Boisemont
- Cergy
- Courdimanche
- Éragny-sur-Oise
- Jouy-le-Moutier
- Maurecourt
- Menucourt
- Neuville-sur-Oise
- Osny
- Pontoise
- Puiseux-Pontoise
- Saint-Ouen-l'Aumône
- Vauréal

Except Maurecourt, which is in the Yvelines department, all communes are part of the Val-d'Oise department.

== Population ==
Historical population
Year	Pop.	±% p.a.
1962	34,050	—
1968	44,292	+4.48%
1975	72,798	+7.36%
1982	106,161	+5.54%
1990	163,125	+5.52%
1999	182,839	+1.28%
2007	193,157	+0.69%
2012	199,143	+0.61%
2017	206,654	+0.74%
2023	220,279	+1.07%
Source: INSEE

Since the establishment of the new agglomeration, the population has quadrupled over forty years.

== History ==
In the 1960s, faced by the fast development of Paris and its suburbs, it was decided to control and balance it by creating several new cities around Paris.

To the north, the choice was made on the surroundings of Pontoise. The old city was to be integrated in a much larger unit, whose center would be Cergy, at the time not more than a village. From 1965, the establishment of the new city was to be done in several stages:

- April 16, 1969: creation of the publicly owned "Établissement public d'aménagement" (EPA)
- 1971: creation of the Syndicat communautaire d'aménagement (SCA).
- August 11, 1972: official creation of the new city of Cergy-Pontoise, gathering fifteen communes (the eleven current ones, and Boisemont, Boissy-l'Aillerie, Méry-sur-Oise and Pierrelaye).
- 1983: the law Rocard amended the new cities.
- 1984: Syndicat d'agglomération nouvelle (SAN) replaces the SCA, four communes left the structure (the four mentioned above)
- December 31, 2002: end of the mission and dissolution of the EPA, following the completion of the new city.
- January 1, 2004: transformation of the SAN into a communauté d'agglomération.
- 2004: Boisemont becomes the 12th commune of Cergy-Pontoise.

== Public transport ==
Bus services are provided by the Stivo (formerly StAN).

Rail services are provided by both the SNCF and the RATP. Two RER lines begin within the new town.

== Economy ==
Subaru France and Bandai France have their head office in Cergy Pontoise.

== Media appearances ==
- L'enfance d'une ville, a 1975 movie by Eric Rohmer
- I as in Icarus, a 1979 movie by Henri Verneuil
- Boyfriends and Girlfriends, a 1987 movie by Eric Rohmer
- Water Lilies, a 2007 movie by Céline Sciamma
- Petite Maman, a 2021 movie by Céline Sciamma

== Twinnings ==
Cergy-Pontoise is a sister city to the planned cities of:

- Columbia, Maryland, United States
- Tres Cantos, Spain
- (United Kingdom) West Lancashire, England (encompassing Skelmersdale, a former new town)

Cergy-Pointoise's twin town partnership with Erkrath, Germany was dissolved in 2019.

== Notable residents ==
Writer and Nobel Prize in Literature laureate Annie Ernaux moved to Cergy-Pontoise in 1975, while the new town was being built. She still lives (as of 2022) in the house that she bought in 1977 with the award from her first literary prize.
