= Canton of Cergy-1 =

Coordinates: 49.05°N 2.03°E

The canton of Cergy-1 is an administrative division of the Val-d'Oise department, Île-de-France region, northern France. It was created at the French canton reorganisation which came into effect in March 2015. Its seat is in Cergy.

It consists of the following communes:

1. Cergy (partly)
2. Osny
3. Puiseux-Pontoise
