= Hôtel de Ville, Cergy =

Town hall in Cergy, France

Hôtel de Ville
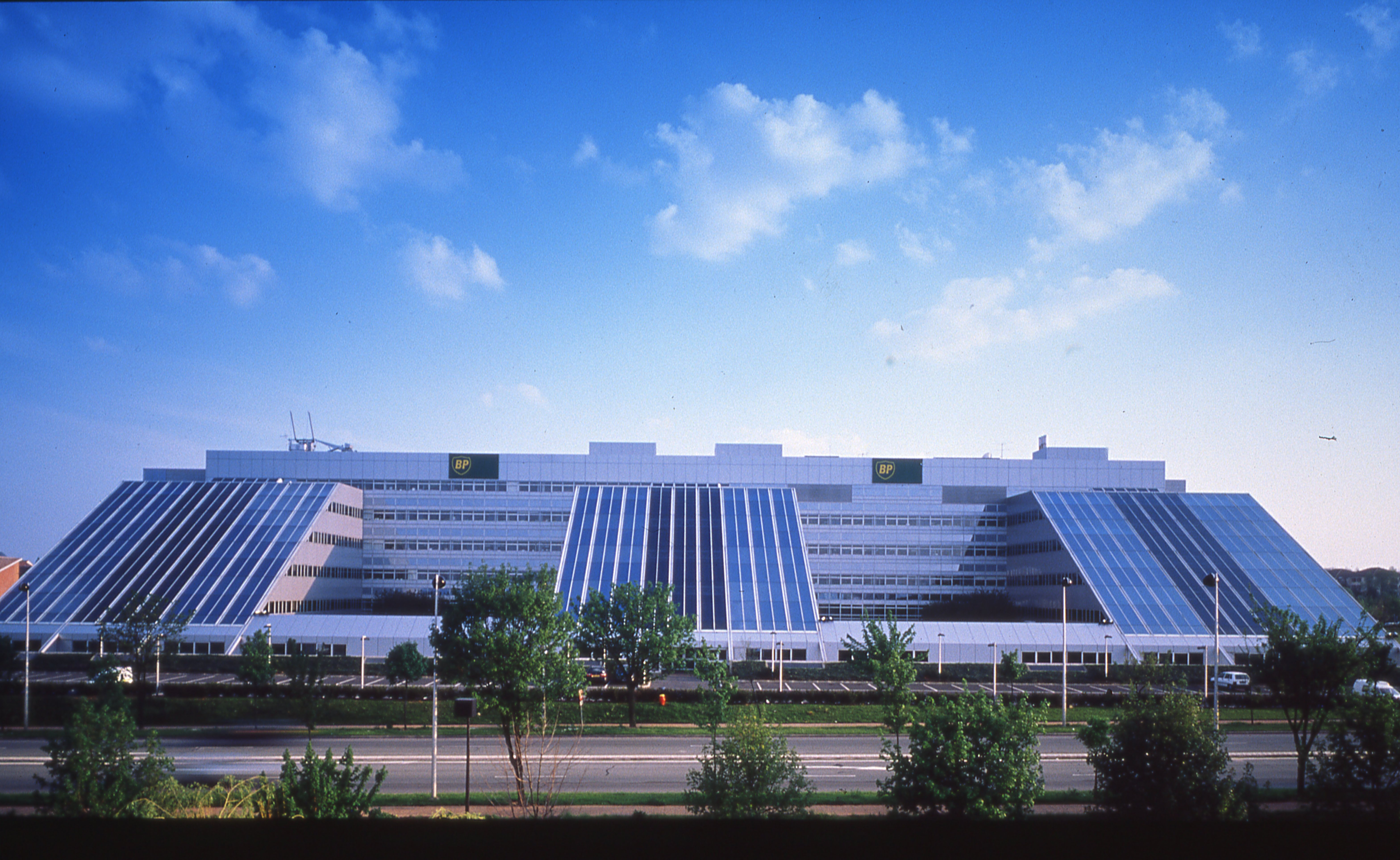
- The main frontage of the Hôtel de Ville in 1991
- Interactive map of the Hôtel de Ville area

General information
- Type: City hall
- Architectural style: Modern style
- Location: Cergy, France
- Coordinates: 49.0526°N 2.0353°E
- Completed: 1990

Design and construction
- Architects: Dominique Armand and Thierry Melot

The Hôtel de Ville (French pronunciation: [otɛl də vil], City Hall) is a municipal building in Cergy, Val-d'Oise, to the northwest of Paris, France, standing on Place Olympe-de-Gouges.

== History ==
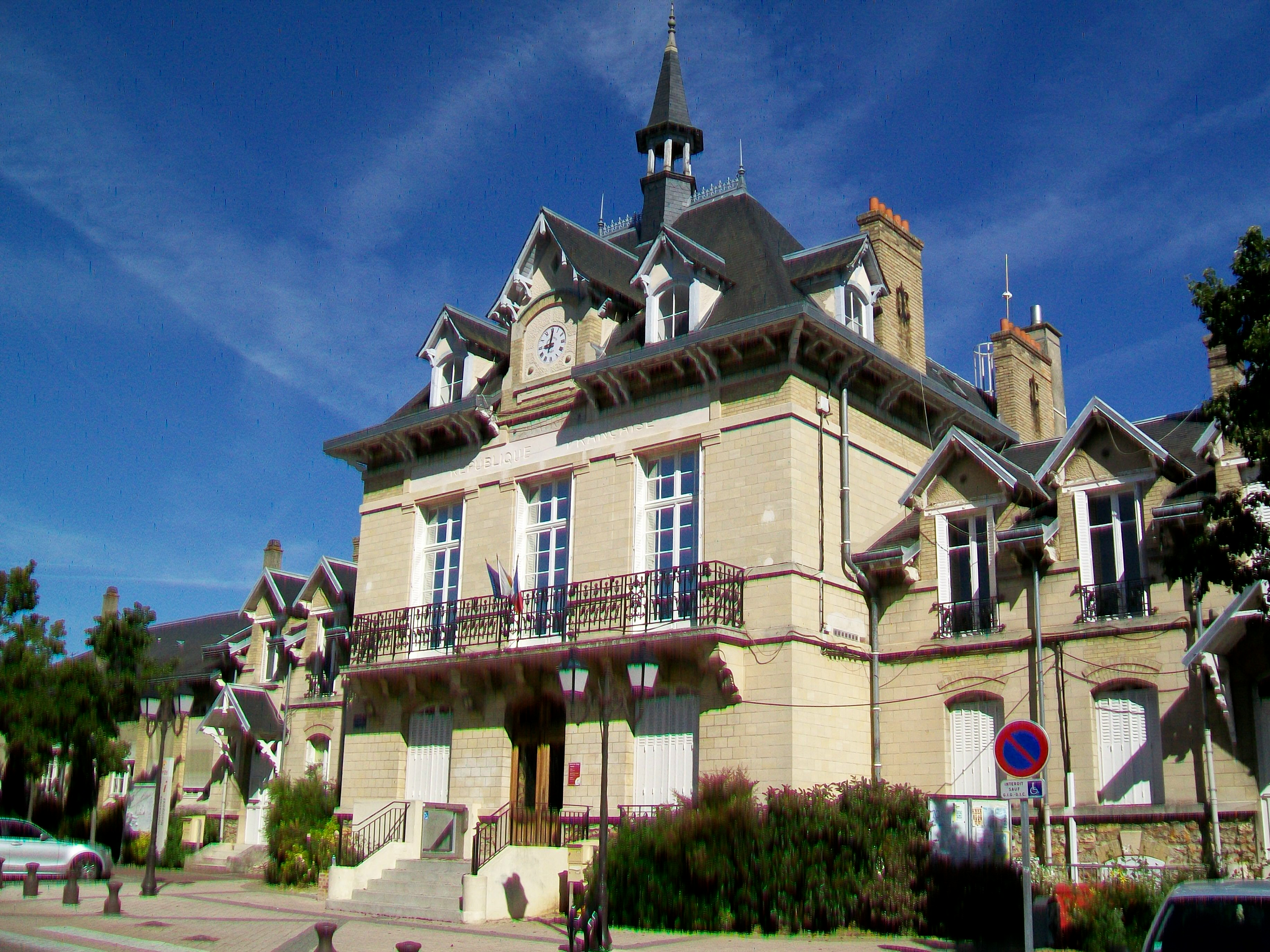
The town hall of 1912

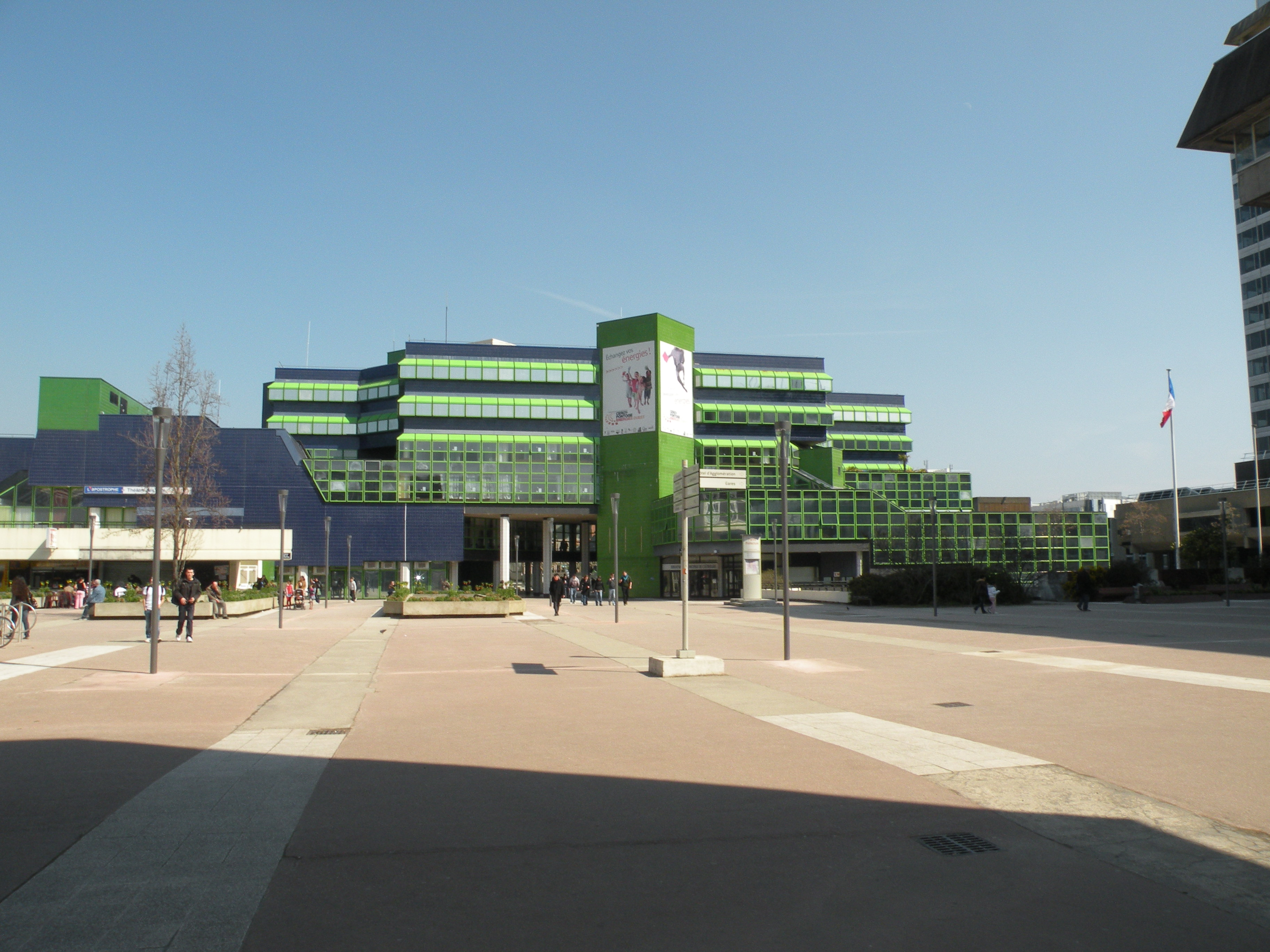
The André Malraux Culteral Centre

Until the late 19th century, Cergy was a village with a population of less than 1,000 people, but it developed rapidly following the opening of the railway line from Pontoise to Poissy in December 1912. In anticipation of this growth, the town council led by the mayor, Victor Geoffroy, decided to commission a combined town hall and school. The site they selected was owned by the Geoffroy family. The new building was designed in the neoclassical style, built in ashlar stone and was officially opened on 14 April 1912.

The design involved a symmetrical main frontage of 25 bays facing onto Rue Nationale. The central block of three bays, which contained the municipal offices, featured a segmental headed doorway with voussoirs and a keystone flanked by two segmental headed windows also with voussoirs and keystones. The bays were flanked by brackets supporting a balcony with iron railings. There were three French doors on the first floor flanked by pilasters supporting an entablature and prominent eaves. At roof level, there was a clock above the central bay, with an octagonal lantern behind it, and there were dormer windows above the outer bays. The wings of 11 bays each, which accommodated the classrooms, comprised two-storey inner sections of three bays each, and single-storey outer sections of eight bays each. Access to the classrooms was through doorways in the inner sections of the wings.

Following a further significant increase in population after the Second World War, largely associated with the development of a new town in Cergy, the council decided to commission a multi-purpose building in the heart of the new town area. The council intended that this would be a cultural centre as well as a town hall. The site they selected was a large open space now known as the Grand Place des Arts. The building was designed by Claude Vasconi and Georges Pencreac'h in the modern style, built in glass and steel and was officially opened on 8 October 1979. The main frontage, which faced onto the Grand Place des Arts, involved a structure with canted corners clad with plate glass rectangles with bright green edges; the design also made extensive use of walls clad in bright blue tiles. The complex became known as the Centre Culturel André Malraux (André Malraux Culteral Centre) to commemorate the life of the novelist and politician, André Malraux.

By the early 21st century, the council, having expanded its operations across several buildings, decided to consolidate its activities in one office building. The building it selected, on Place Olympe-de-Gouges, had been commissioned by BP in the mid-1980s. It was designed by Dominique Armand and Thierry Melot in the modern style, built in glass and steel and was officially opened in 1990. The building, which became known the Gémeaux building, was acquired by the council in 2006. The design involved a long rectangular structure, clad in glass and grey panels, with wings projecting to the north.
