= Ham (Cergy) =

Village in France

Coordinates: 49°1′36″N 2°3′30″E

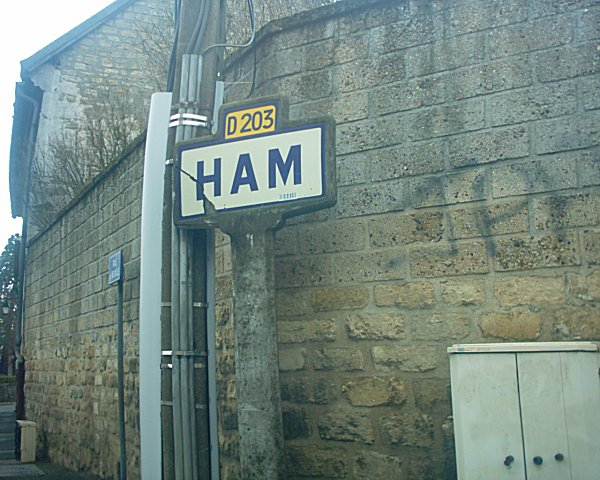
Ham village sign

Ham [am] is a small village to the south of Cergy. The village used to be part of the Sergentery and then commune of Neuville-sur-Oise but has since been amalgamated in the commune of Cergy.

It is situated on the southern side of the River Oise and is linked to Cergy by a one way bridge. The area is rather flat as it is inside the last meander of the river.

On its territory is the outdoor leisure centre Base de Loisirs de Cergy-Neuville.
