= Neuville-sur-Oise =

- Commune
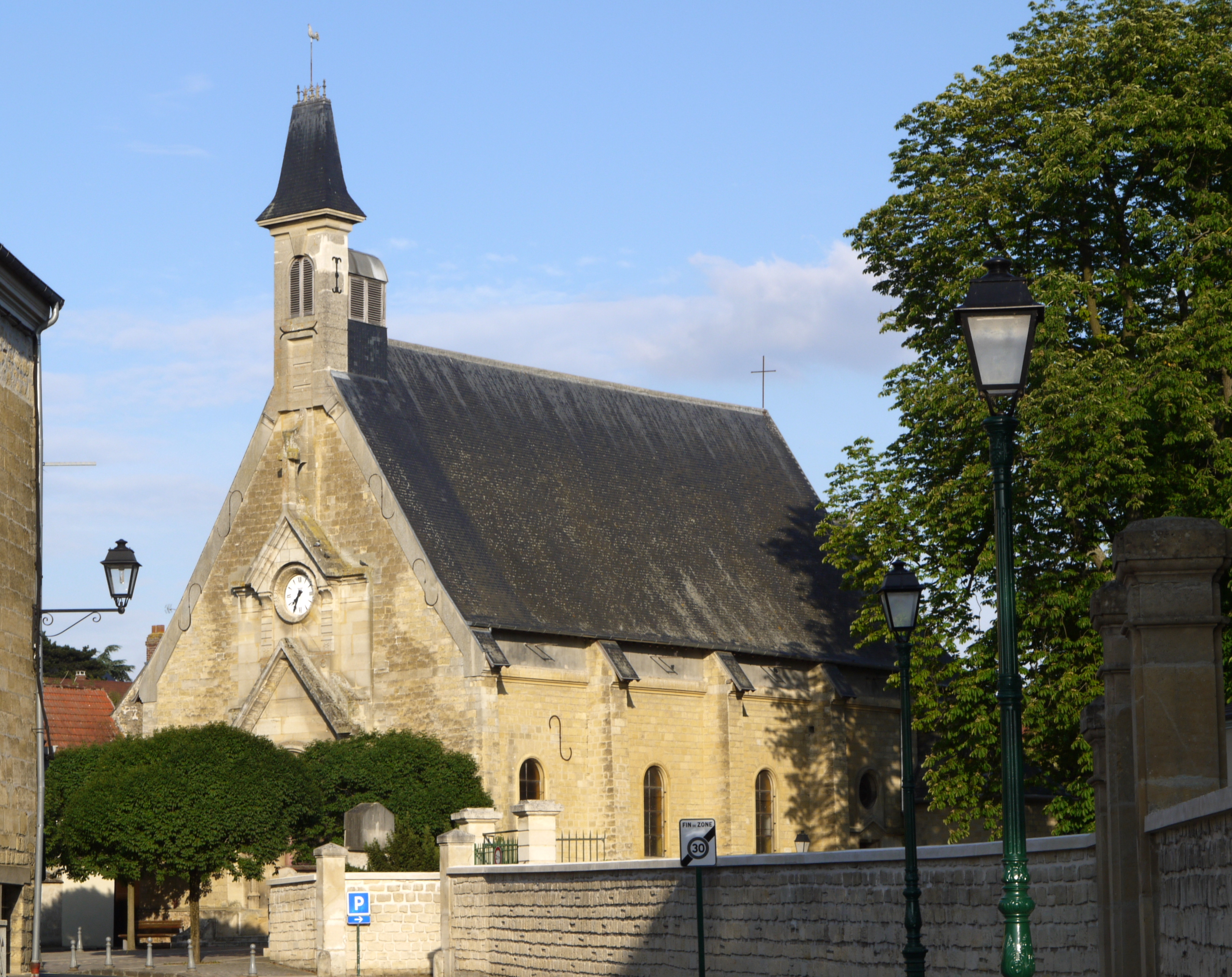
- The church of Saint-Joseph, in Neuville-sur-Oise

- Coat of arms
- Location of Neuville-sur-Oise
- Location within France Location within Île-de-France (region)
- Coordinates: 49°00′56″N 2°03′36″E
- Country: France
- Region: Île-de-France
- Department: Val-d'Oise
- Arrondissement: Pontoise
- Canton: Cergy-2
- Intercommunality: Cergy-Pontoise

Government
  - Mayor (2020–2026): Gilles Le Cam
- Area^{1}: 4.25 km^{2} (1.64 sq mi)
- Highest elevation: 54 m (177 ft)
- Lowest elevation: 19 m (62 ft)
- Population (2023): 2,058
  - Density: 484/km^{2} (1,250/sq mi)
- Demonym: Neuvillois
- Time zone: UTC+01:00 (CET)
  - Summer (DST): UTC+02:00 (CEST)
- INSEE/Postal code: 95450 /95000
- Website: www.neuville-sur-oise.fr
- ^{1} French Land Register data, which excludes lakes, ponds, glaciers > 1 km^{2} (0.386 sq mi or 247 acres) and river estuaries.

Neuville-sur-Oise (French pronunciation: [nøvil syʁ waz]; lit. 'Neuville-on-Oise') is a commune in the Val-d'Oise department, in the northwestern outer suburbs of Paris, France. It is part of the larger "new town" (now an agglomeration community) of Cergy-Pontoise, created in the 1960s.

Neuville-sur-Oise is a rather anonymous village between Jouy-le-Moutier and Cergy inside the last meander of the river Oise. Forty years after the creation of Cergy-Pontoise, the village has retained its bucolic atmosphere and there has been little construction of large scale residential developments.

In the 17th century, Charles de la Grange unites the villages of Ham (Cergy), the Sergentery of Neuville-sur-Oise and the Barony of Conflans. The Baron of Conflans, councillor to the king, Lord of Neuville and Ham built the castle of Neuville.

In 1995 was opened the university of Cergy-Neuville on the site of an old cottage near the D203, a station was also built to serve both the village and the university.

== Population ==
Historical population
Year	Pop.	±% p.a.
1968	905	—
1975	858	−0.76%
1982	885	+0.44%
1990	1,036	+1.99%
1999	1,433	+3.67%
2007	1,569	+1.14%
2012	2,004	+5.02%
2017	2,048	+0.44%
2023	2,058	+0.08%
Source: INSEE

== Public transport ==
Since 1995, Neuville-sur-Oise is served by the Neuville-Université station on the RER line A line. As well as rail, Neuville is served by two bus lines; 48 and 34S linking Neuville to Cergy, Pontoise and Jouy-le-Moutier.

== Château de Neuville ==
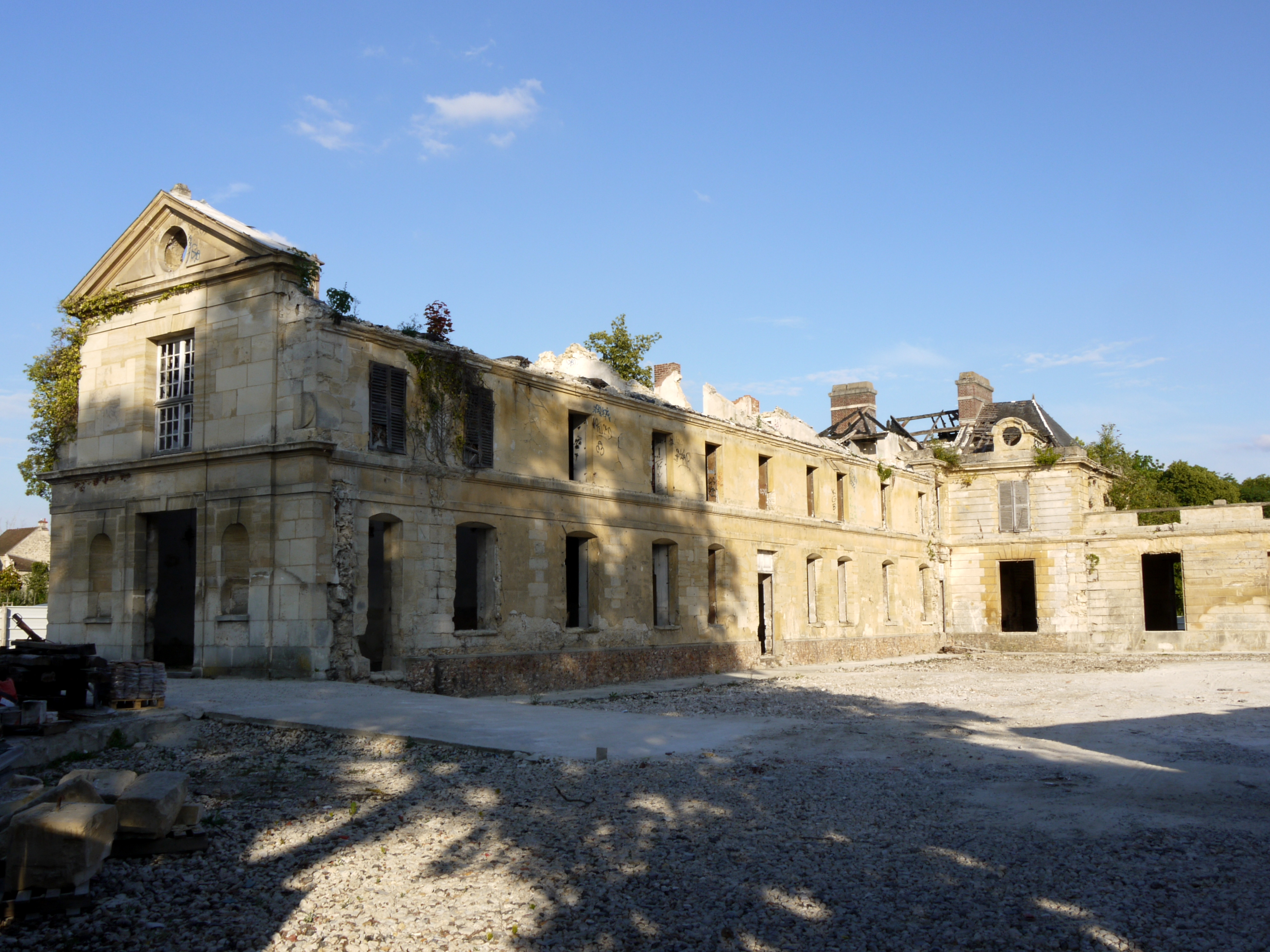
The Chateau de Neuville before its refurbishment

Built by Charles de la Grange, Lord of Neuville in 1640. During the 17th and the 18th centuries, the castle was owned by Anne de la Grange (Marquise de Frontenac), the Marquis de Castellane (Marshall of the king's armies), the Count Florimond de Mercy-Argenteau (Ambassador of Austria in France). The castle has been abandoned since 1989 is the victim of vandalism. A project is afoot to refurbish the building and turn into an old people's home and return this residence to its former glory.

== Pavillon d'Amour ==
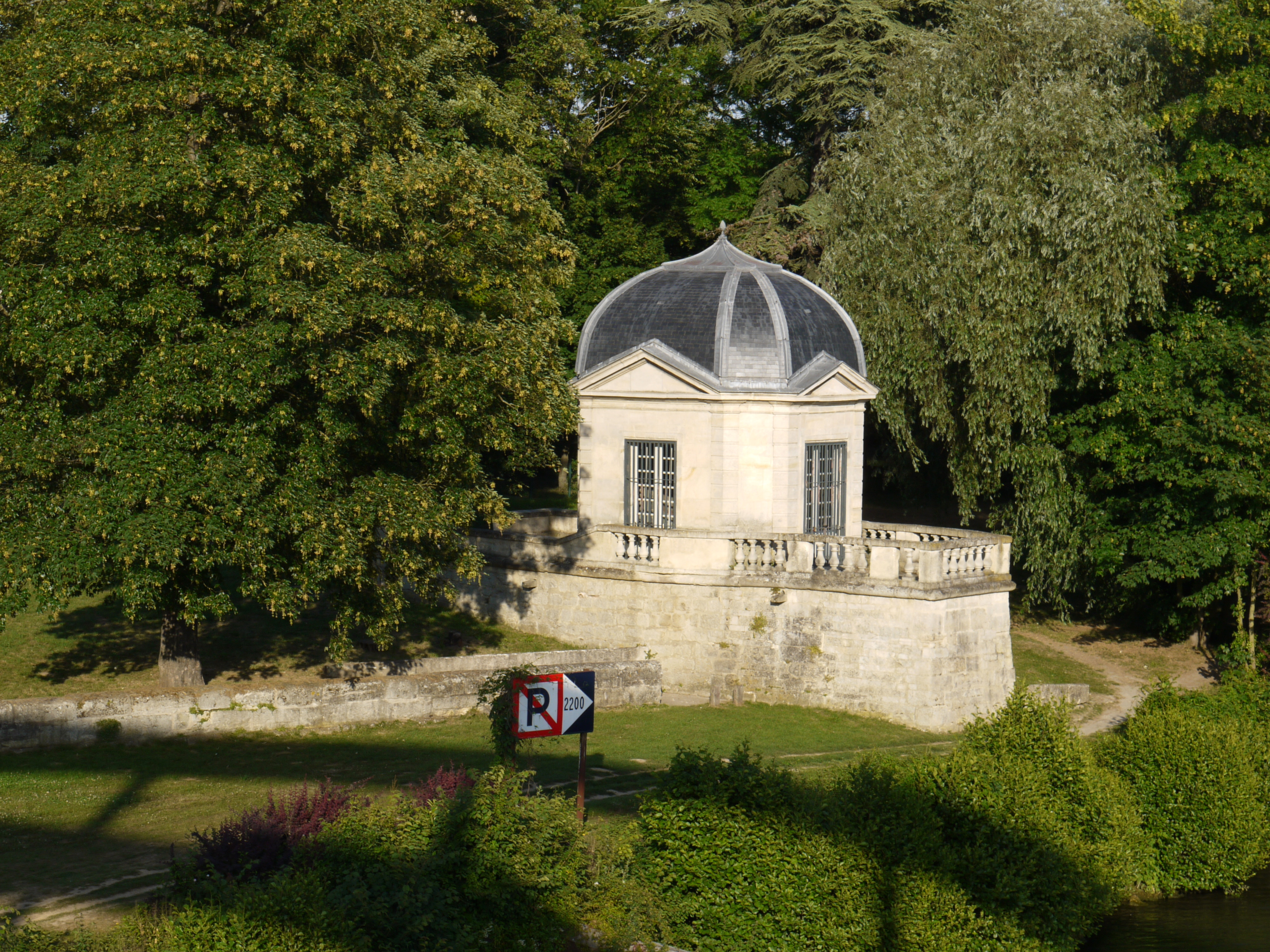
Le Pavillon d'Amour

Le Pavillon d'Amour is a listed building situated Place du Pont on a small terrace in a park on the bank of the river Oise. the interior is composed of pine walls with a blue painted dome white clouds and statuettes of birds.

== Le Pont de Neuville ==
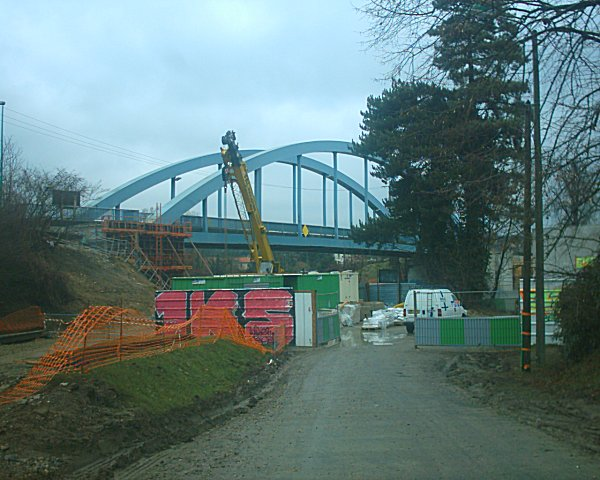
The bridge between Neuville-sur-Oise and Jouy-le-Moutier

In the early 20th century was built a suspension bridge between Neuville and Jouy-le-Moutier. This bridge replaced the ferry service between the communes. At the dawn of the war a new bridge was built to replace the dilapidated suspension bridge, it was dynamited a few months after its inauguration when the war broke off. A new bridge identical to the previous one was built in 1974.

== Education ==
It has a primary school, École Gustave Eiffel.

== See also ==
- Communes of the Val-d'Oise department
