= Etablissement Notre-Dame-de-la-Compassion =

Etablissement Notre-Dame-de-la-Compassion is a Catholic private school institution in Val-d'Oise, France, in the Paris metropolitan area. It includes:

- Lycée Privé Catholique Notre-Dame-de-la-Compassion (also including a junior high school or collège) in Pontoise
- Lycée Notre-Dame de la Compassion Elisabeth Molé (technological and vocational high school) in Jouy-le-Moutier

Lycée Elisabeth Molé opened in January 2012.
