= Éragny-sur-Oise =

- Commune
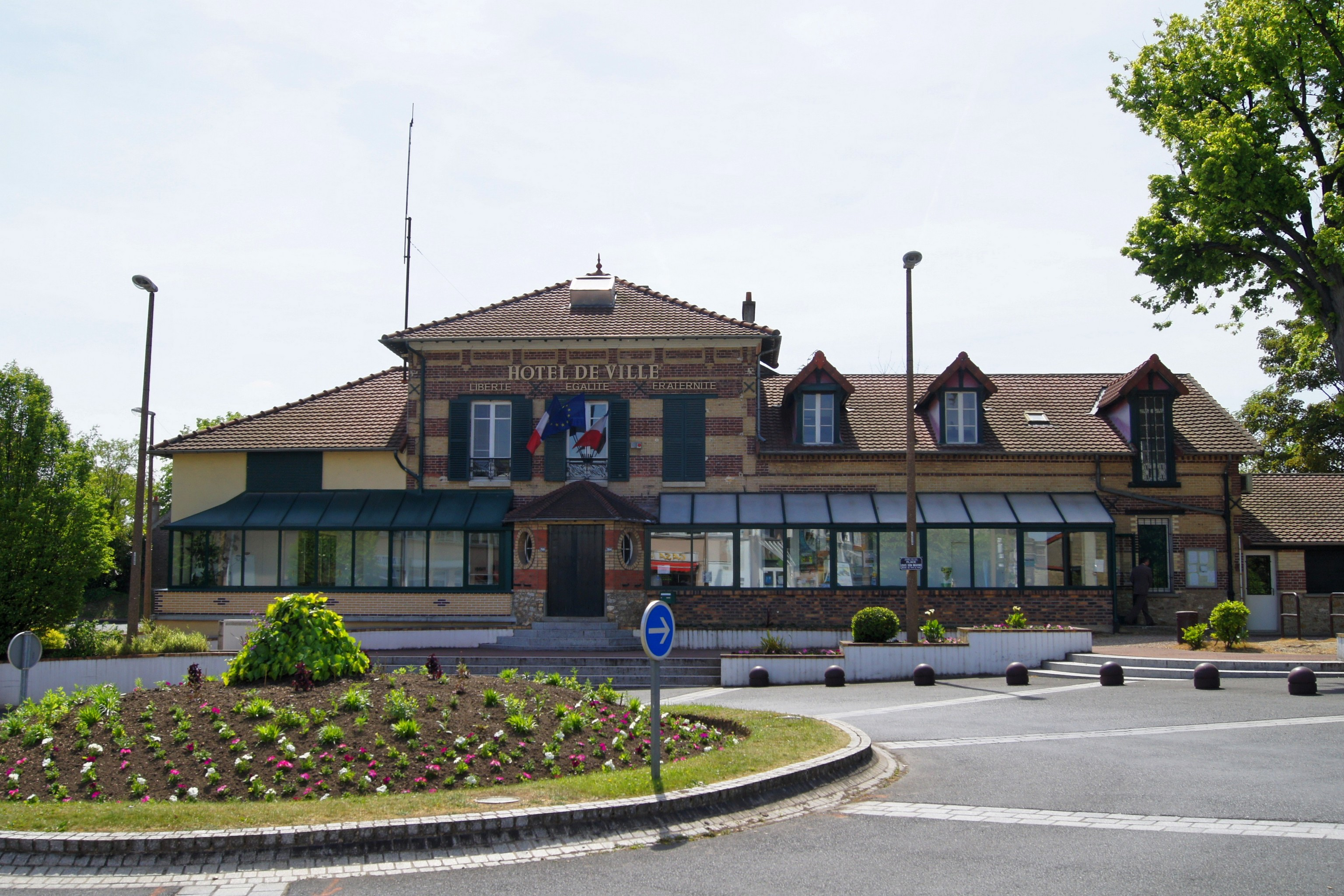
- Éragny Town Hall

- Coat of arms

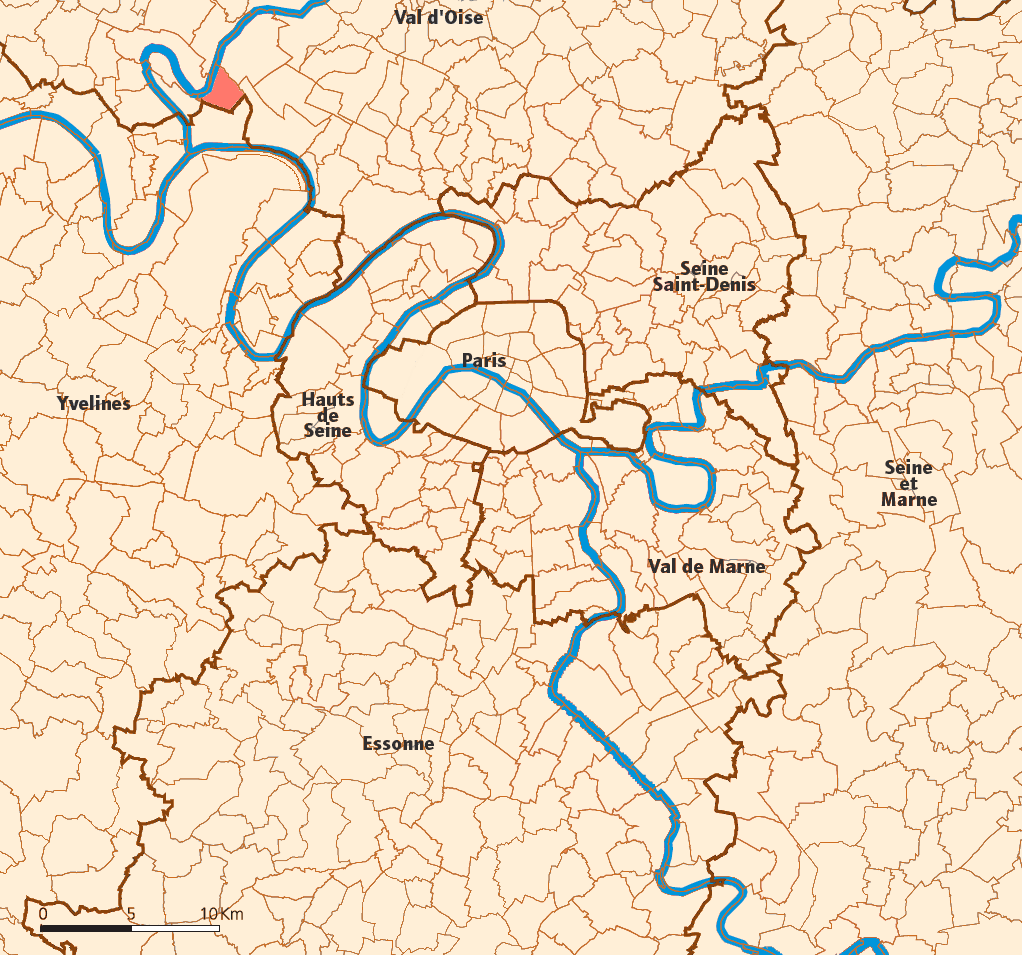
- Location (in red) within Paris inner and outer suburbs
- Location of Éragny-sur-Oise
- Location within France Location within Île-de-France (region)
- Coordinates: 49°01′05″N 2°05′32″E
- Country: France
- Region: Île-de-France
- Department: Val-d'Oise
- Arrondissement: Pontoise
- Canton: Cergy-2
- Intercommunality: Cergy-Pontoise

Government
  - Mayor (2020–2026): Thibault Humbert
- Area^{1}: 4.72 km^{2} (1.82 sq mi)
- Highest elevation: 56 m (184 ft)
- Lowest elevation: 22 m (72 ft)
- Population (2023): 18,436
  - Density: 3,910/km^{2} (10,100/sq mi)
- Time zone: UTC+01:00 (CET)
  - Summer (DST): UTC+02:00 (CEST)
- INSEE/Postal code: 95218 /95610
- ^{1} French Land Register data, which excludes lakes, ponds, glaciers > 1 km^{2} (0.386 sq mi or 247 acres) and river estuaries.

Éragny-sur-Oise (before 2026: Éragny, pronounced [e.ʁa.ɲi.sy.ʁwaz]) is a commune in the northwestern suburbs of Paris, France. It is located 26.3 km (16.3 mi) from the centre of Paris, in the "new town" of Cergy-Pontoise, Val-d'Oise, created in the 1960s.

== Population ==
Inhabitants are called Éragniens (masculine) and Éragniennés (feminine) in French.

Historical population
Year	Pop.	±% p.a.
1968	3,638	—
1975	3,638	+0.00%
1982	15,034	+22.47%
1990	16,941	+1.50%
1999	15,568	−0.93%
2007	16,416	+0.67%
2012	16,914	+0.60%
2017	17,354	+0.51%
2023	18,436	+1.01%
Source: INSEE

The population figures show very light growth the 30 last years after the very strong growth of 1975/1982.

== Buildings ==
=== History ===
- 1968: 1,056
- 1975: 1,289
- 1982: 5,138
- 1990: 5,664
- 1999: 5,682

The distribution and approximately of 50/50 for the area, the proportion collective/individual is also 50/50, which shows a balance in the distribution. Development and population growth was at a peak between 1975 and 1982 but has declined recently (18 in 9 years). This weak current rate of construction of residences reflects demand. Density of residences is still low for an urban area at 1200 /km^{2}.

List of successive mayors :

Thibault Humbert (UMP) 2014–2020

Dominique Gillot (PS) 2001–2014

Murielle De Coster (UDF) 1995–2001

Louis Don Marino (PCF) 1971–1995

== Geography ==
- Area: 1.82 mile² (4.7 km^{2})
- Altitude: 52 m

== History ==
Situated on the Oise river, Éragny remained a small village until the 20th century. Its original inhabitants probably settled around the town's fountain during the Roman period and named the place Heriniacus or Areniacus. The site changed names several times over the following centuries – Eraisgny, Eraigny, Erargny, and finally settling on Éragny by the 10th century.

Local quarries have yielded stone tools from the Lower and Middle Palaeolithic. Éragny and Conflans-Sainte-Honorine (Yvelines) were once a single parish, with Éragny the main settlement. Documents from around 1100 AD spell the name as Herigniacus or Erinniacus. In the early 12th century the vicomte de Pontoise, Raoul Deliès, gave a church dedicated to Saint Germain of Paris to the Cluniac Priory of Saint-Martin-des-Champs.

It is in 1564 that Jean d'Alessa came from Italy to buy the seigniory of Éragny. Jean d'Alesso (1513–72) was the first known seigneur of Éragny. He was treasurer of the constable Anne de Montmorency (1492–1567) and adviser of King Charles IX of France (1550–74). His descendant François d'Alesso d'Éragny, marquis d'Éragny, was appointed governor general of the American islands in 1690. Their family insignia, "d'azur au sautoir d'or cantonné de quatre limaçons d'argent", was the model for the town's current one. His heirs have spread his initial possessions and have kept them until the French Revolution when they were confiscated as "emigrated possession".

In the 18th century the village was concentrated on the hillside above the floodplain, and the land was covered with crops, vineyards and woods. There were stone quarries in the meander of the river. A windmill was built shortly before the French Revolution. It was demolished in 1841. In 1804 the botanist and novelist Jacques-Henri Bernardin de Saint-Pierre (1737–1814) came to live in the former presbytery of the village. He was the author of Paul and Virginie, and disciple of Jean-Jacques Rousseau. After his death in 1814, the village remained relatively unknown. At that time, the town had fewer than 500 inhabitants, consisting mainly of farmers.

The village held a telegraph tower, part of a private line from Paris to Le Havre, until 1835. The church was destroyed in World War II by a crashed English airplane, and was rebuilt in the 1950s.

In 1868, almost half of the territory of Éragny was detached and became the commune of Neuville-sur-Oise.

With the arrival of the railroad started the exploitation of quarries used until then for local needs.

The rise of the ville nouvelle of Cergy-Pontoise, at the end of the 1960s, led to the town's population to mushroom. Many streets were born on what is called "le plateau" and Éragny took today's aspect with about 16,000 inhabitants loving their good living town.

== Transportation ==
Éragny is served by Éragny–Neuville station on the Transilien Paris-Saint-Lazare suburban rail line.

== Education ==
The commune has seven primary school groups. The schools include:

- Preschools (maternelles): de la Challe, Henri Fillette, Le Bois, Pablo Neruda, Les Dix Arpents, La Butte, Le Grillon
- Elementary schools: Henri Fillette, Le Bois, Les Longues Rayes, Pablo Neruda, Les Dix Arpents, La Butte, Le Grillon

There is one junior high school, Collège Léonard de Vinci, and one vocational high school, Lycée Professionnel Auguste Escoffier.

== Notable residents ==
- Samuel Paty, middle school teacher killed and beheaded in 2020 in Islamist terrorist attack.

== See also ==
- Communes of the Val-d'Oise department
