= Cergy =

- commune
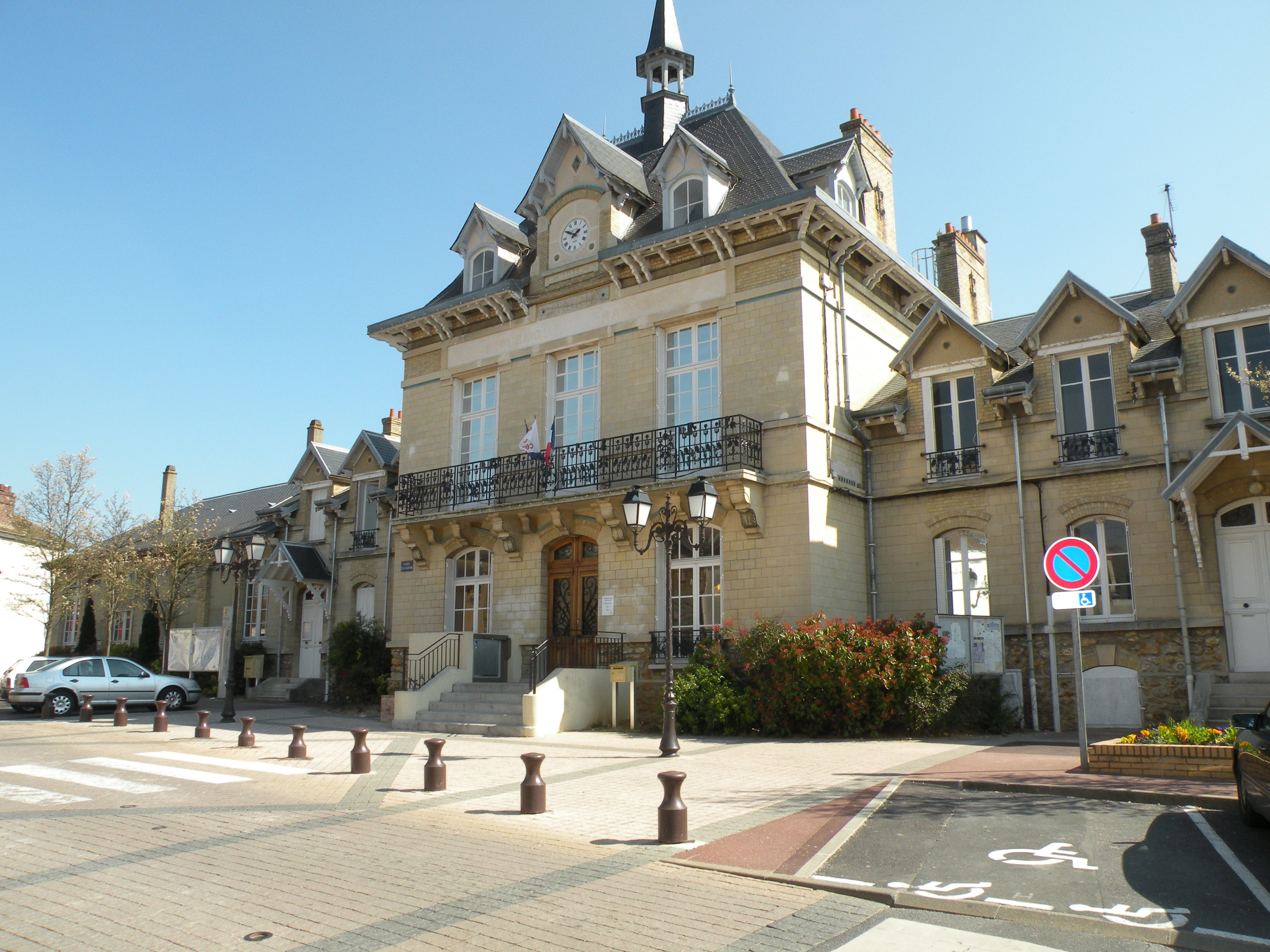
- The old Hôtel de Ville (town hall)

- Coat of arms

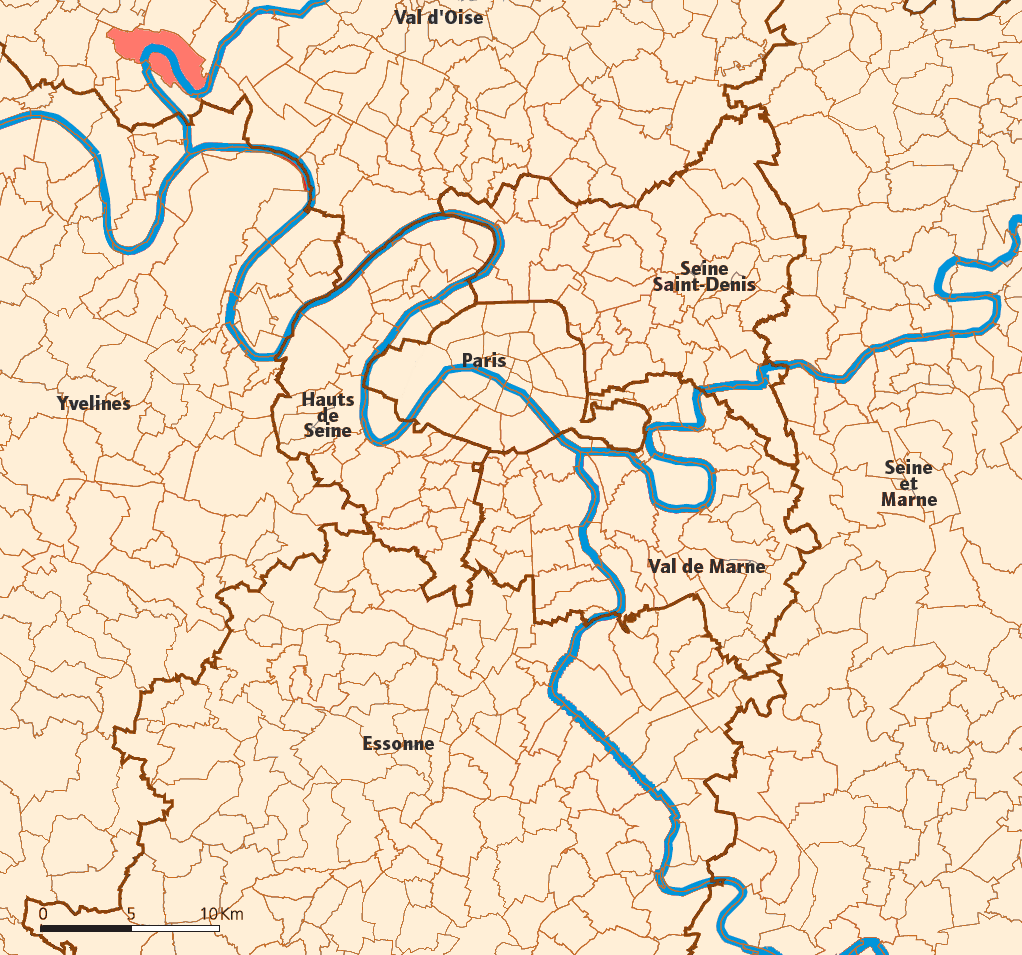
- Location (in red) within Paris inner and outer suburbs
- Location of Cergy
- Location within France Location within Île-de-France (region)
- Coordinates: 49°02′10″N 2°03′47″E
- Country: France
- Region: Île-de-France
- Department: Val-d'Oise
- Arrondissement: Pontoise
- Canton: Cergy-1 and 2
- Intercommunality: Cergy-Pontoise

Government
  - Mayor (2020–2026): Jean-Paul Jeandon
- Area^{1}: 11.68 km^{2} (4.51 sq mi)
- Elevation: 25 m (82 ft)
- Highest elevation: 121 m (397 ft)
- Lowest elevation: 21 m (69 ft)
- Population (2023): 70,906
  - Density: 6,071/km^{2} (15,720/sq mi)
- Time zone: UTC+01:00 (CET)
  - Summer (DST): UTC+02:00 (CEST)
- INSEE/Postal code: 95127 /95000
- ^{1} French Land Register data, which excludes lakes, ponds, glaciers > 1 km^{2} (0.386 sq mi or 247 acres) and river estuaries.

Cergy (French pronunciation: [sɛʁʒi]) is a commune in the French department of Val-d'Oise, to the northwest of Paris. It is located 27.8 km (17.3 mi) from the centre of Paris, in the "new town" of Cergy-Pontoise, created in the 1960s, of which it is the central and most populated commune.

Although neighbouring Pontoise is the official préfecture (capital) of the Val-d'Oise département, the préfecture building and administration, as well as the department council (conseil général), are located inside the commune of Cergy. The sous-préfecture building and administration, on the other hand, are located inside the commune of Pontoise.

== Name ==
The name Cergy comes from Medieval Latin Sergiacum, meaning "estate of Sergius", a Gallo-Roman landowner.

== Administration ==
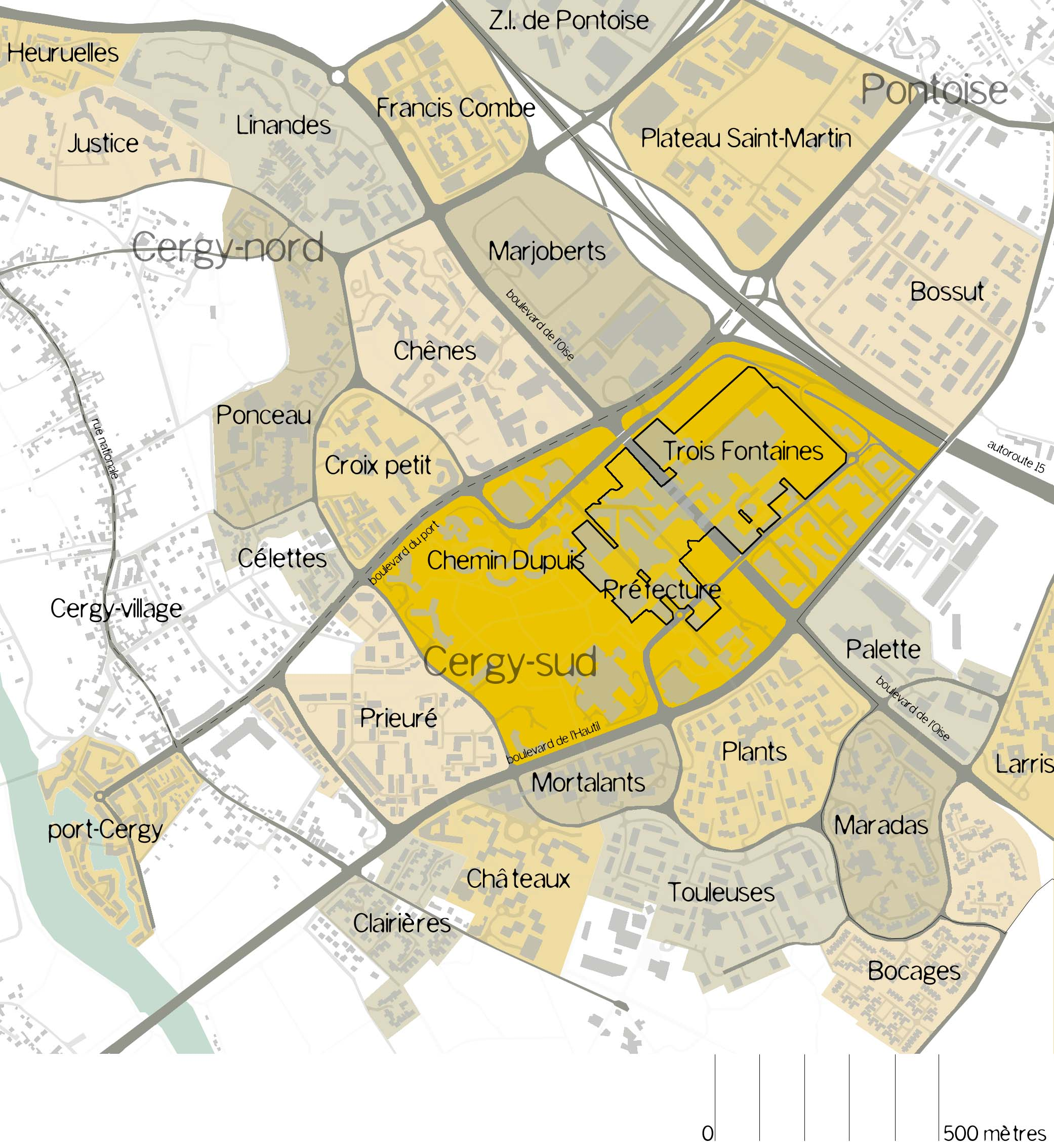
Map of the quarters of Cergy

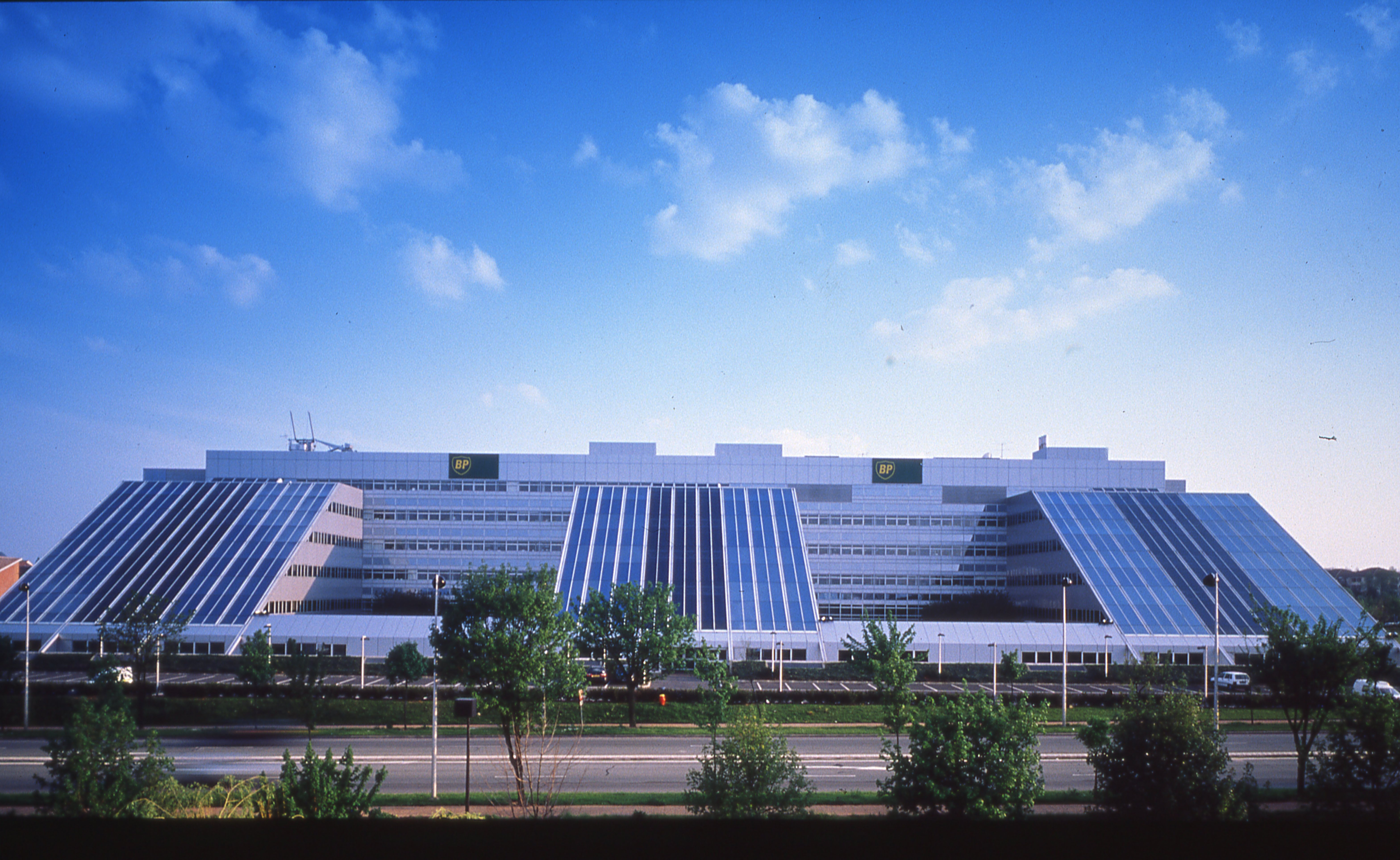
The new Hôtel de Ville (town hall)

Cergy is the chief town of two cantons: Cergy-1 and Cergy-2.

The new Hôtel de Ville (town hall) was completed in 1990.

== Demographics ==
When Cergy was selected to become the center of a "new town", it was only a village. The commune had only 2,895 inhabitants in 1968. It then started to develop very quickly, exceeding 10,000 inhabitants in the mid-1970s and then 20,000 in the early-1980s. It is in this decade that its growth was most spectacular, since the city exceeded 48,000 inhabitants in 1990. The increase continued since, but at a notably slower pace, to reach 54,500 at 2004 estimates. However, in December 2001, the commune lost a portion of its territory (net 0.03 km^{2} (0.012 sq mi) with a 1999 population of 62 persons) to the adjacent commune of Courdimanche. The official census figures have thus been revised downward from the 1999 official 54,781 to 54,719, and the land area from 11.68 km^{2} (4.51 sq mi) to 11.65 km^{2}.

Historical population

Year	Pop.	±% p.a.
1793	1,045	—
1800	1,084	+0.52%
1806	1,069	−0.23%
1821	987	−0.53%
1831	1,016	+0.29%
1836	1,000	−0.32%
1841	970	−0.61%
1846	956	−0.29%
1851	963	+0.15%
1856	922	−0.87%
1861	933	+0.24%
1866	953	+0.43%
1872	926	−0.48%
1876	897	−0.79%
1881	869	−0.63%
1886	889	+0.46%
1891	897	+0.18%
1896	902	+0.11%
1901	885	−0.38%

Year	Pop.	±% p.a.
1906	942	+1.26%
1911	933	−0.19%
1921	963	+0.32%
1926	1,060	+1.94%
1931	1,118	+1.07%
1936	1,106	−0.22%
1946	1,138	+0.29%
1954	1,447	+3.05%
1962	2,455	+6.83%
1968	2,895	+2.79%
1975	8,896	+17.39%
1982	19,357	+11.75%
1990	48,226	+12.09%
1999	54,781	+1.43%
2007	57,600	+0.63%
2012	60,528	+1.00%
2017	65,177	+1.49%
2023	70,906	+1.41%

Source: EHESS and INSEE (1968–2023)

=== Immigration ===
Place of birth of residents of Cergy in 1999
Born in metropolitan France	Born outside metropolitan France			
78.2%	21.8%			
78.2%	Born in overseas France	Born in foreign countries with French citizenship at birth^{1}	EU-15 immigrants^{2}	Non-EU-15 immigrants
78.2%	2.8%	3.4%	1.9%	13.7%
^{1} This group is made up largely of former French settlers, such as pieds-noirs in Northwest Africa, followed by former colonial citizens who had French citizenship at birth (such as was often the case for the native elite in French colonies), as well as to a lesser extent foreign-born children of French expatriates. A foreign country is understood as a country not part of France in 1999, so a person born for example in 1950 in Algeria, when Algeria was an integral part of France, is nonetheless listed as a person born in a foreign country in French statistics.^{2} An immigrant is a person born in a foreign country not having French citizenship at birth. An immigrant may have acquired French citizenship since moving to France, but is still considered an immigrant in French statistics. On the other hand, persons born in France with foreign citizenship (the children of immigrants) are not listed as immigrants.

== Port Cergy ==
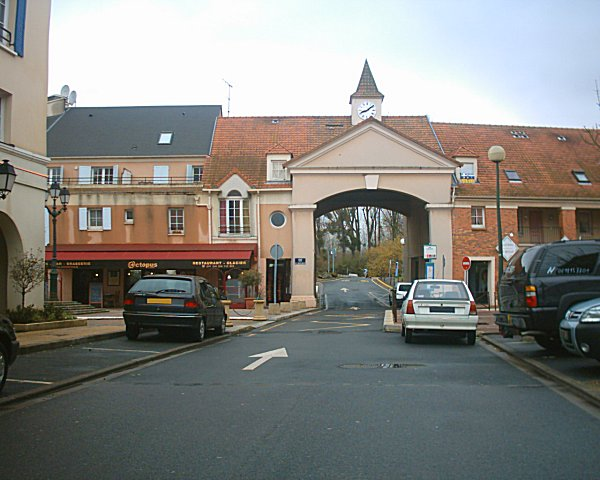
Port Cergy

Port Cergy is a marina on the River Oise at pk 9. The site comprises both housing and recreational yachts as well as a boating school. The marina can hold 103 ships ranging 5 to 22m long and. The northern part of the site is reserved for restaurants and shops and have been built around a small bain.

== Ham ==
Ham is a small village to the south of Cergy. The village used to be part of the Sergentery and then commune of Neuville-sur-Oise but has since been amalgamated in the commune of Cergy. On its territory is the outdoor leisure centre 'Base de Loisirs de Cergy-Neuville'.

== Transport ==
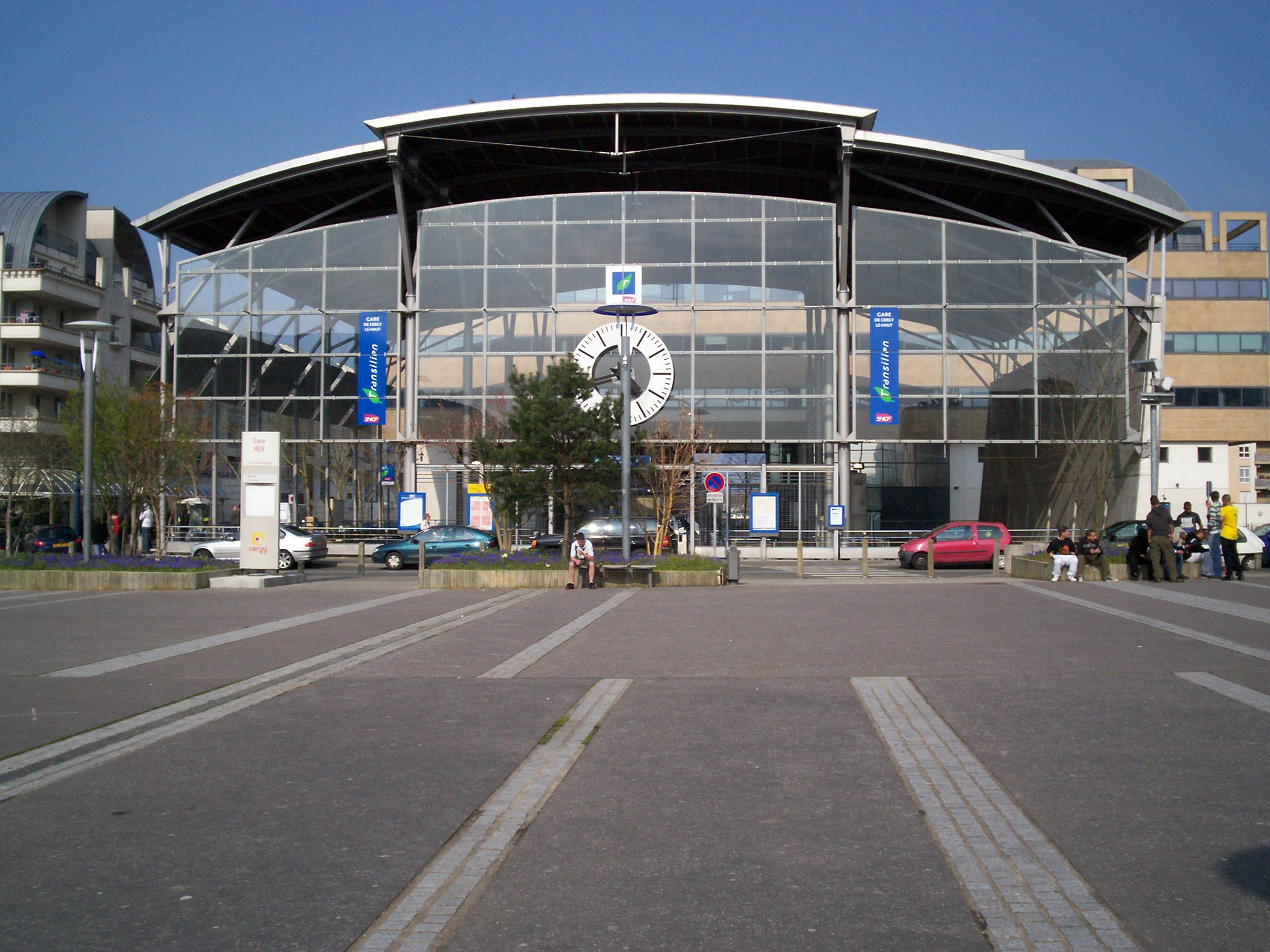
Train station of Cergy le Haut

Cergy is served by three stations on Paris RER line A and on the Transilien Paris-Saint-Lazare suburban rail line: Cergy-Préfecture, Cergy-Saint-Christophe, and Cergy-le-Haut. Cergy is served by direct buses from Charles de Gaulle Airport.

The bus company STIVO provides 17 lines of buses to travel within the agglomeration of Cergy.

== Education ==
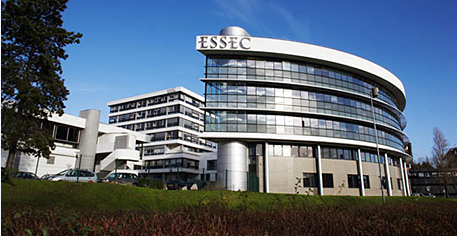
ESSEC campus in Cergy, France

Secondary schools:

- Junior high schools (collèges): Gérard Philipe, La Justice, Les Explorateurs, Les Touleuses, Moulin à Vent
- Senior high schools/sixth-form colleges: Lycée polyvalent Galilée and Lycée polyvalent Jules Verne

Lycée Alfred Kastler de Cergy-Pontoise is in neighbouring Pontoise.

Tertiary education:

- Cergy-Pontoise University
- CY Tech, formerly EISTI (École internationale des sciences du traitement de l'information)
- ESSEC Business School (grande école)
- ENSEA École Nationale Supérieure de l'Électronique et de ses Applications
- ITIN, IT-Institute (École supérieure d'informatique, réseaux et systèmes d'information)
- Web site of Professional Bachelor’s degree in International Trade and International Tourism (Cergy-Pontoise University)

== Security ==
Known as being a violent city in the past, with a criminal rate of 137.62 incidents per 1000 inhabitants, Cergy-Pontoise has experienced a significant decrease of violence in recent years.

== In popular culture ==
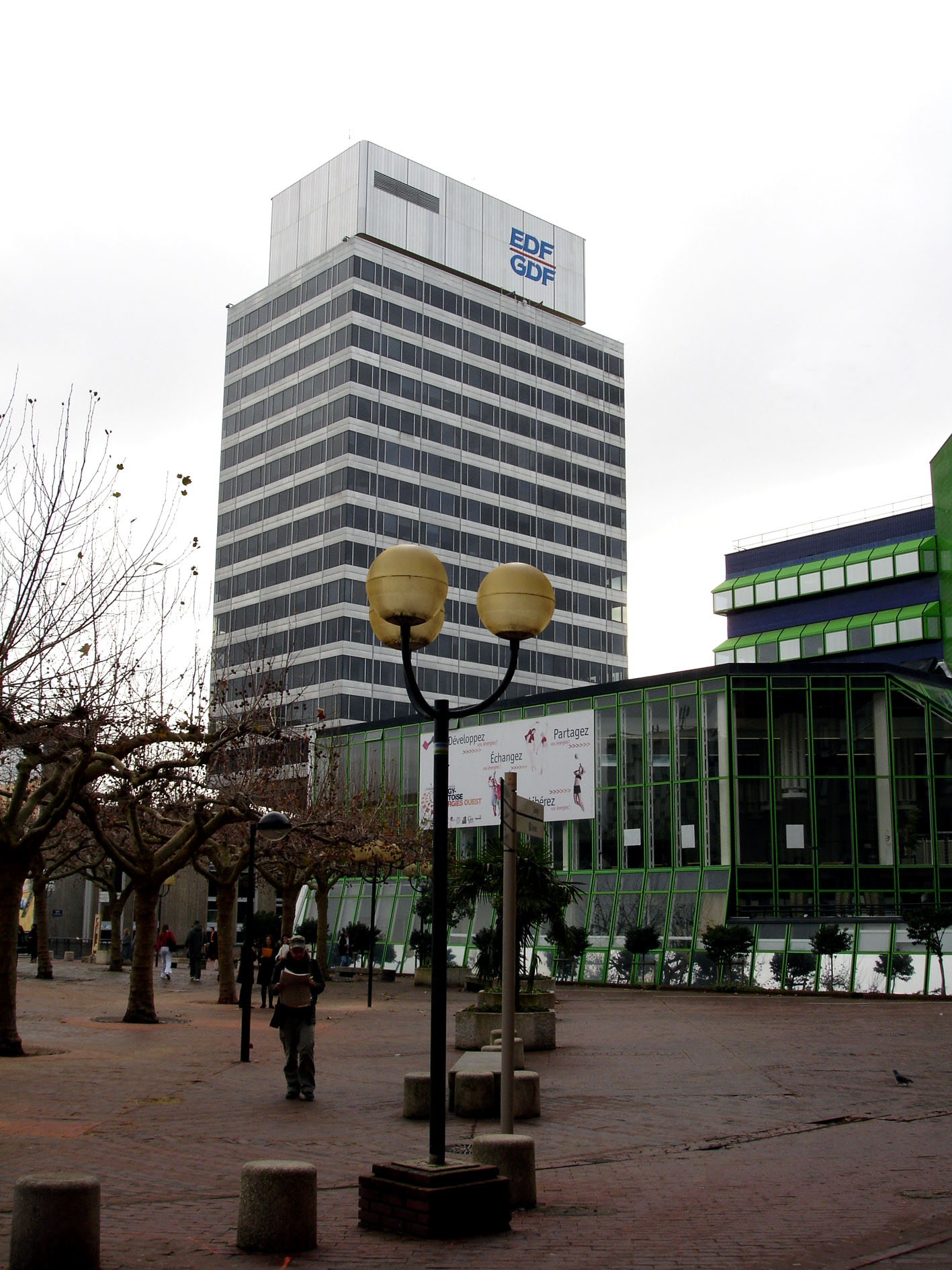
EDF-GDF tower, Cergy-Pontoise (France)

The town was used as a filming location for Henri Verneuil's film I... comme Icare released in 1979, starring Yves Montand. The EDF-GDF tower designed by architect Renzo Moro is the building from which the shots were fired to assassinate president Marc Jarry. The country that the movie depicts is not named, although the United States is perhaps suggested. The filmmakers chose the modern and innovative architecture of the new city to avoid depicting any particular country.

The town was also the location of the 1987 film My Girlfriend's Boyfriend directed by Éric Rohmer.

== Notable people ==
- Erwan Kepoa Falé

== Twin towns – sister cities ==
Cergy is twinned with:

- Columbia, United States
- West Lancashire, England, United Kingdom

Cergy's twinning with Erkrath, Germany, was dissolved in 2019.

== See also ==
- Communes of the Val-d'Oise department
