= Lycée Galilée (Cergy) =

School in France

Lycée Galilée is a senior high school/sixth-form college in Cergy, Val-d'Oise, France, in the Paris metropolitan area.

It is within the Cergy-Saint-Christophe area of the commune.

As of 2016 it had 1,200 students. It has English and German-based European sections.
