= Jouy-le-Moutier =

- Commune
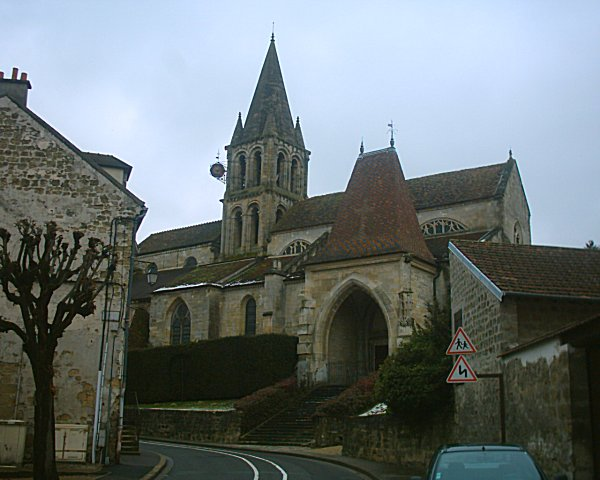
- Notre-Dame

- Coat of arms

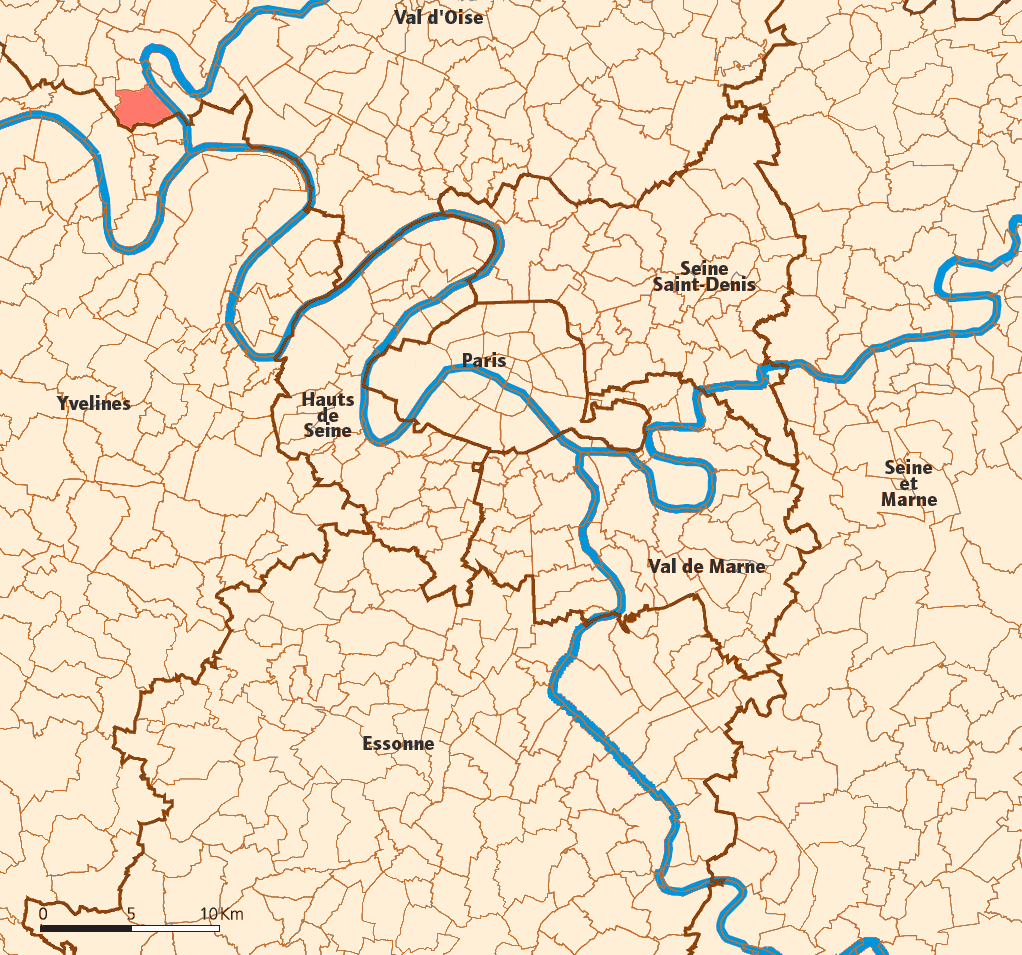
- Location (in red) within Paris inner and outer suburbs
- Location of Jouy-le-Moutier
- Location within France Location within Île-de-France (region)
- Coordinates: 49°00′42″N 2°02′23″E
- Country: France
- Region: Île-de-France
- Department: Val-d'Oise
- Arrondissement: Pontoise
- Canton: Cergy-2
- Intercommunality: Cergy-Pontoise

Government
  - Mayor (2020–2026): Hervé Florczak
- Area^{1}: 6.89 km^{2} (2.66 sq mi)
- Elevation: 35 m (115 ft)
- Highest elevation: 175 m (574 ft)
- Lowest elevation: 21 m (69 ft)
- Population (2023): 17,854
  - Density: 2,590/km^{2} (6,710/sq mi)
- Time zone: UTC+01:00 (CET)
  - Summer (DST): UTC+02:00 (CEST)
- INSEE/Postal code: 95323 /95280
- ^{1} French Land Register data, which excludes lakes, ponds, glaciers > 1 km^{2} (0.386 sq mi or 247 acres) and river estuaries.

Jouy-le-Moutier (French pronunciation: [ʒwi lə mutje]) is a commune in the Val-d'Oise department, in the northwestern suburbs of Paris, France. It is located 28.4 km (17.6 mi) from the center of Paris, in the "new town" of Cergy-Pontoise, created in the 1960s.

== History ==
The name Jouy-le-Moutier has only been in use since the 13th century. Two charters by Charlemagne to the bishop of Paris, Eschenradus gave the chapter of Notre Dame de Paris the possession of the church of Andrésy. When the parish of Jouy was created the chapter of Andrésy became its owner. There is no known nomination at the parish of Jouy before 1186.

In 1250 the parish of Vauréal was created from part of the parish of Jouy. Once again it was the chapter of Notre Dame de Paris who chose the first vicar of Jouy. Two letters dated 2 April 1250 from Renaud de Corbeil, bishop of Paris, authorised the parish of Jouy-le-Moutier to build a baptismal church.

The monks of Saint Martin-des-Champs owned in Jouy land and a hostel. The Cistercians of Notre-Dame-du-Val (near L'Isle-Adam) were also owners of land as early as the 13th century. The rich Benedictines of the abbey of Saint Martin-des-Champs built in the 12th near the Fontaine à Jouy a building called La Maison des Moines which was used as a cellar. Wine growers paid their taxes in wine. The main agriculture of Jouy was wine as well as fruit growing.

At the beginning of the 20th century the village saw the arrival of the railway. A viaduct crossing the Rue de la Vallée was built in 1912 carrying the CGB line from Maurecourt to Pontoise following the River Oise valley.

In 1978 the village saw the construction of a thousand new dwellings on the plateau in relation to the creation of the new town of Cergy-Pontoise. The population grew from 1,200 to 10,000 in less than 5 years. Today most administrative duties are still performed in the village's town hall.

== Population ==
Historical population
Year	Pop.	±% p.a.
1968	1,087	—
1975	1,183	+1.22%
1982	6,473	+27.48%
1990	16,582	+12.48%
1999	17,804	+0.79%
2007	16,923	−0.63%
2012	16,371	−0.66%
2017	16,035	−0.41%
2023	17,854	+1.81%
Source: INSEE

== Public transport ==
Jouy-le-Moutier is served by no station of the Paris Métro, RER, or suburban rail network. The closest station to Jouy-le-Moutier is Neuville-Université station on Paris RER line A and on SNCF's Réseau Saint-Lazare suburban rail network. This station is located in the neighbouring commune of Neuville-sur-Oise, 2.4 km (1.5 mi) from the town centre (Les Eguerêts) of Jouy-le-Moutier, and is reached by bus service 34S linking Jouy-le-Moutier to Pontoise.

== Education ==
Primary schools:

- Preschools (Maternelles): Les Éguerets, Les Jouannes, Le Noyer, Les Tremblays, Le Vast
- Elementary schools: La Côte-des-Carrières, Les Retentis, Les Vaux-Labours, Le Village

Secondary schools:

- Junior high schools: Collège Henri Guillaumet and Collège Les Merisiers
  - Collège Les Toupets is in nearby Vauréal
- Senior high schools:Lycée polyvalent de l’Hautil and Lycée technologique et professionnel Elisabeth Molé

Cergy-Pontoise University is the area university.

== Sites of interest ==
=== Église Notre-Dame ===
Built in the 12th and 16th centuries and is regarded a chef d'œeuvre of architecture. In the 1930s both of the tower's clocks were replaced by a metallic clock placed on the western corner of the tower.

=== Théâtre Saint Vincent ===
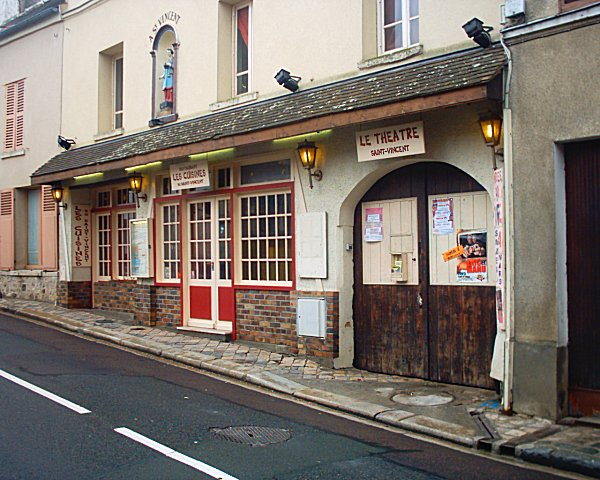
Théâtre Saint Vincent in Jouy le Moutier

The Théâtre Saint-Vincent was built in 1811 and restored by les Beaux Arts de Paris in 1992 and has 120 seats. This superb Italian baroque has its walls covered in paintings highly colourful, an old balcony and oak flooring. The theatre was partially destroyed by a fire in 1866. It is used for many occasions including café-théatre and musical nights, balls and weddings.

=== Le Pont de Neuville ===
In the early 20th century was built a suspension bridge between Neuville and Jouy. This bridge replaced the ferry service between the communes. At the dawn of the war a new bridge was built to replace the dilapidated suspension bridge, it was dynamited a few months after its inauguration when the war broke off. A new bridge identical to the previous one was built in 1974.

== Personalities ==
- Théophile Steinlen (1859–1923), a painter who lived and worked in Jouy-le-Moutier.

== Gallery ==
Shield

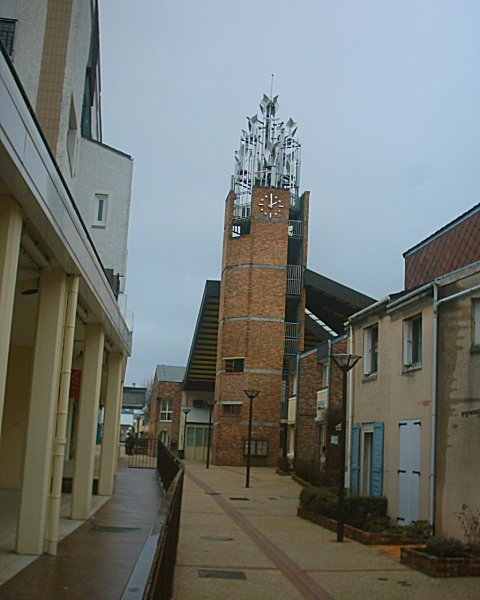
Maison de Quartier

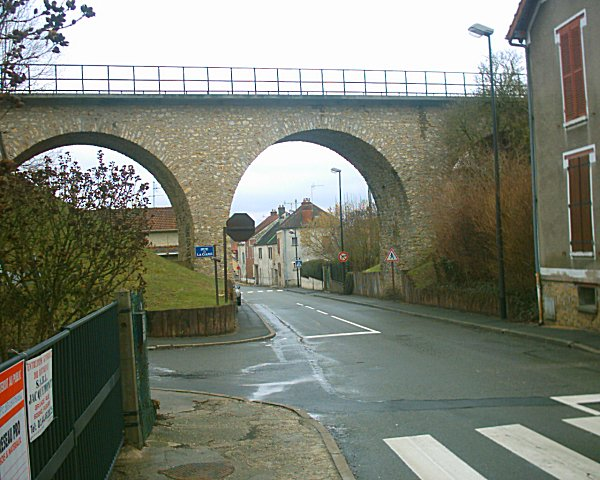
Railway bridge on Valley Street

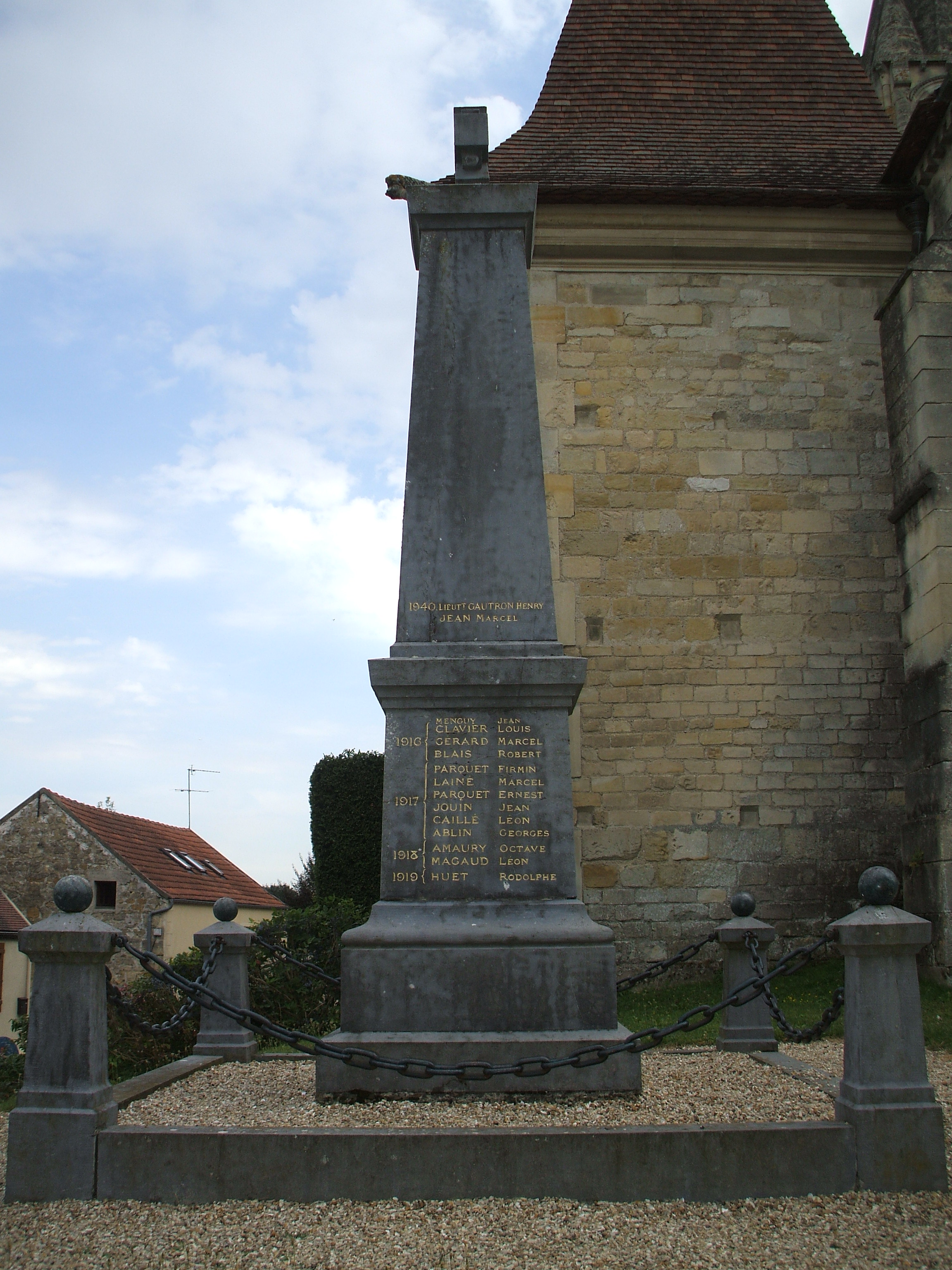
War memorial

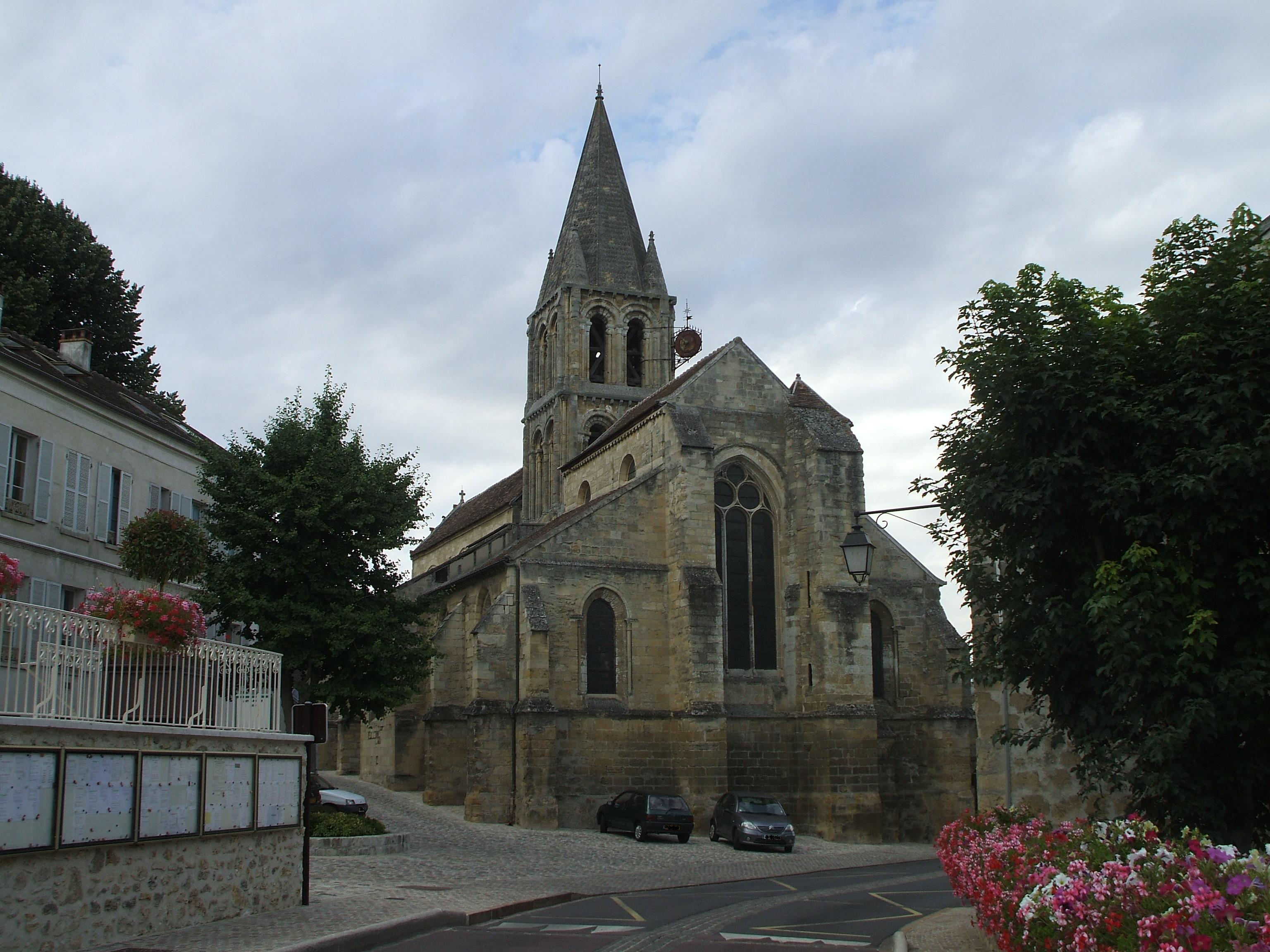
Church

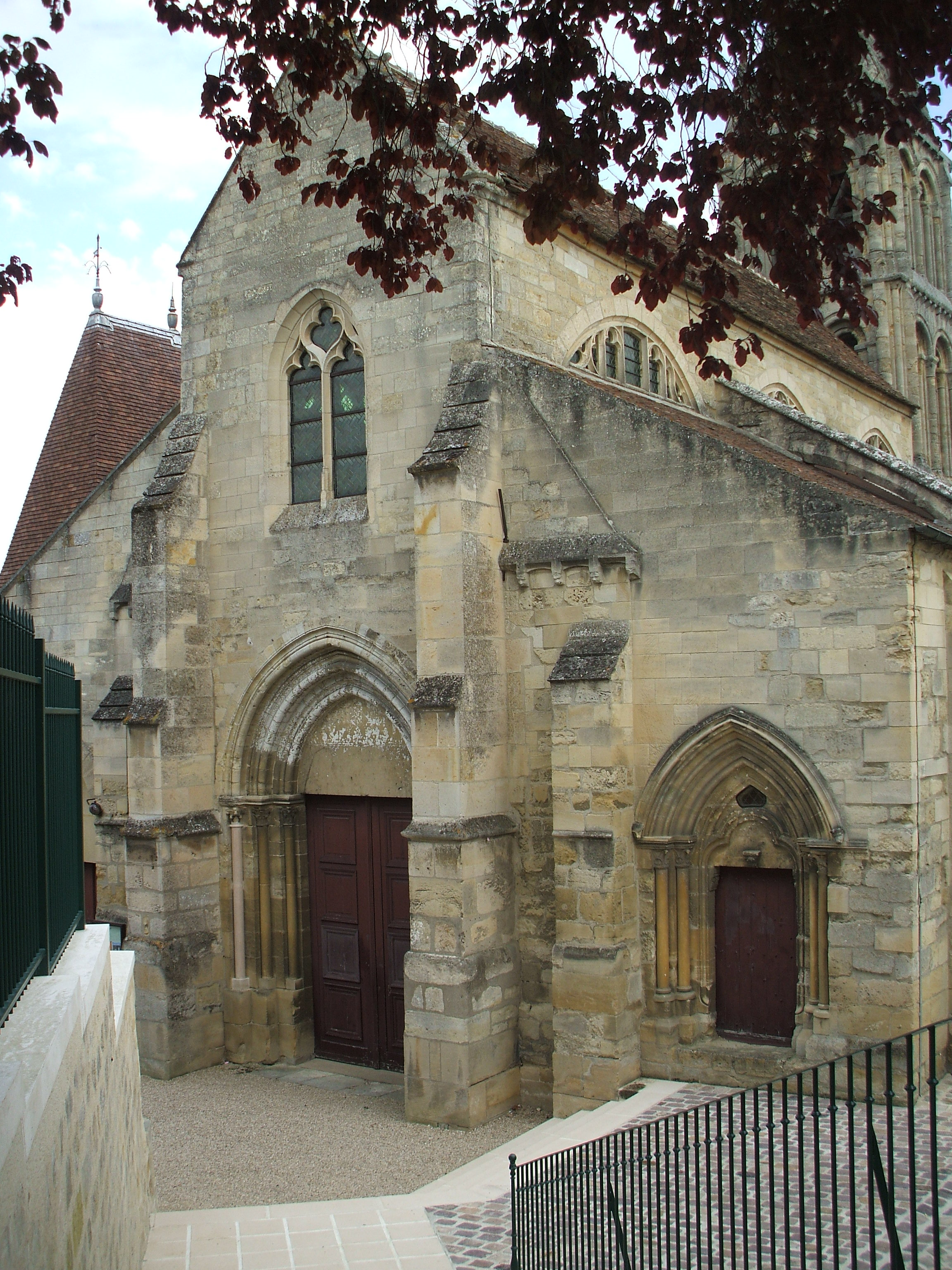
Church

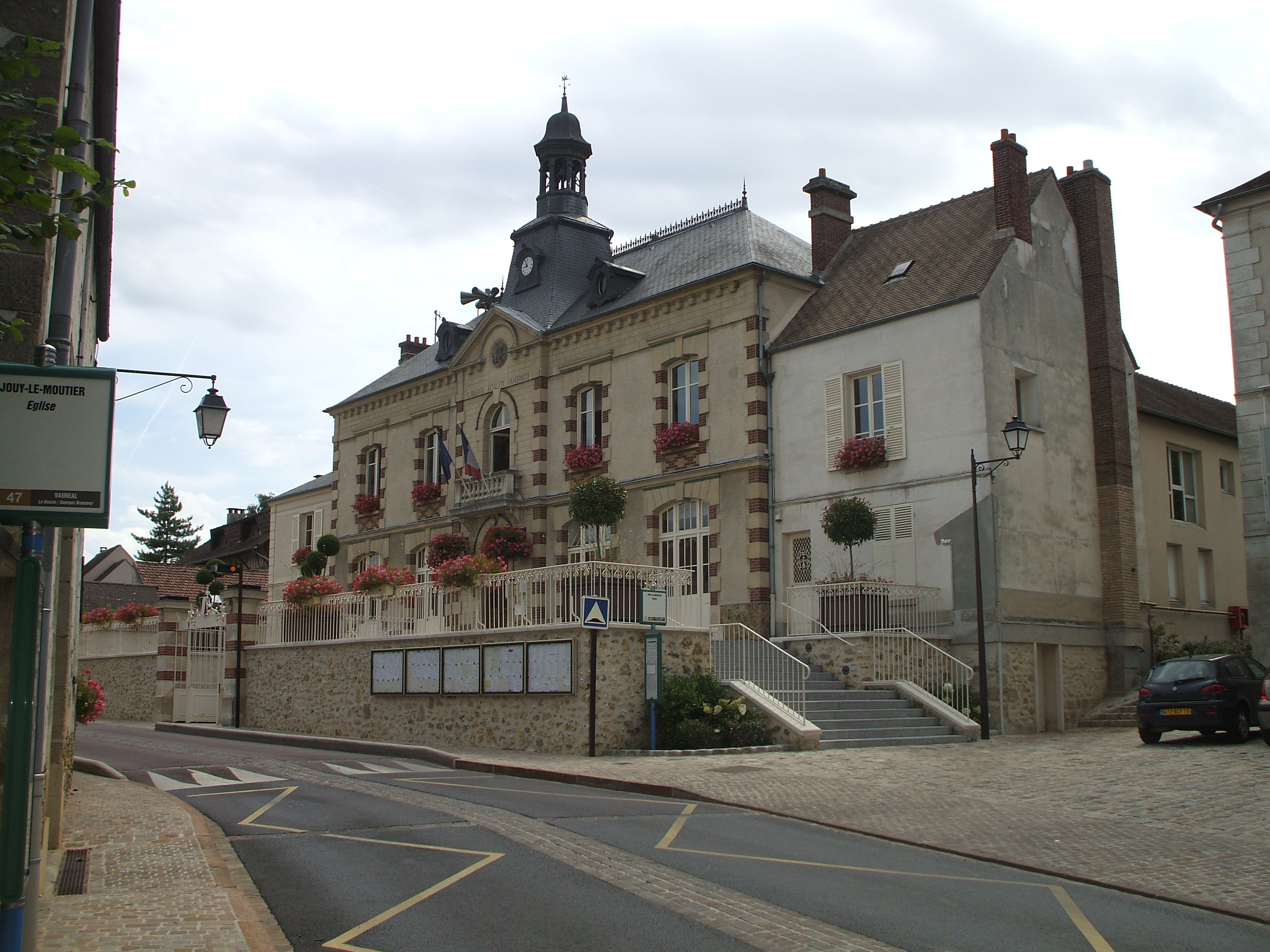
Town hall

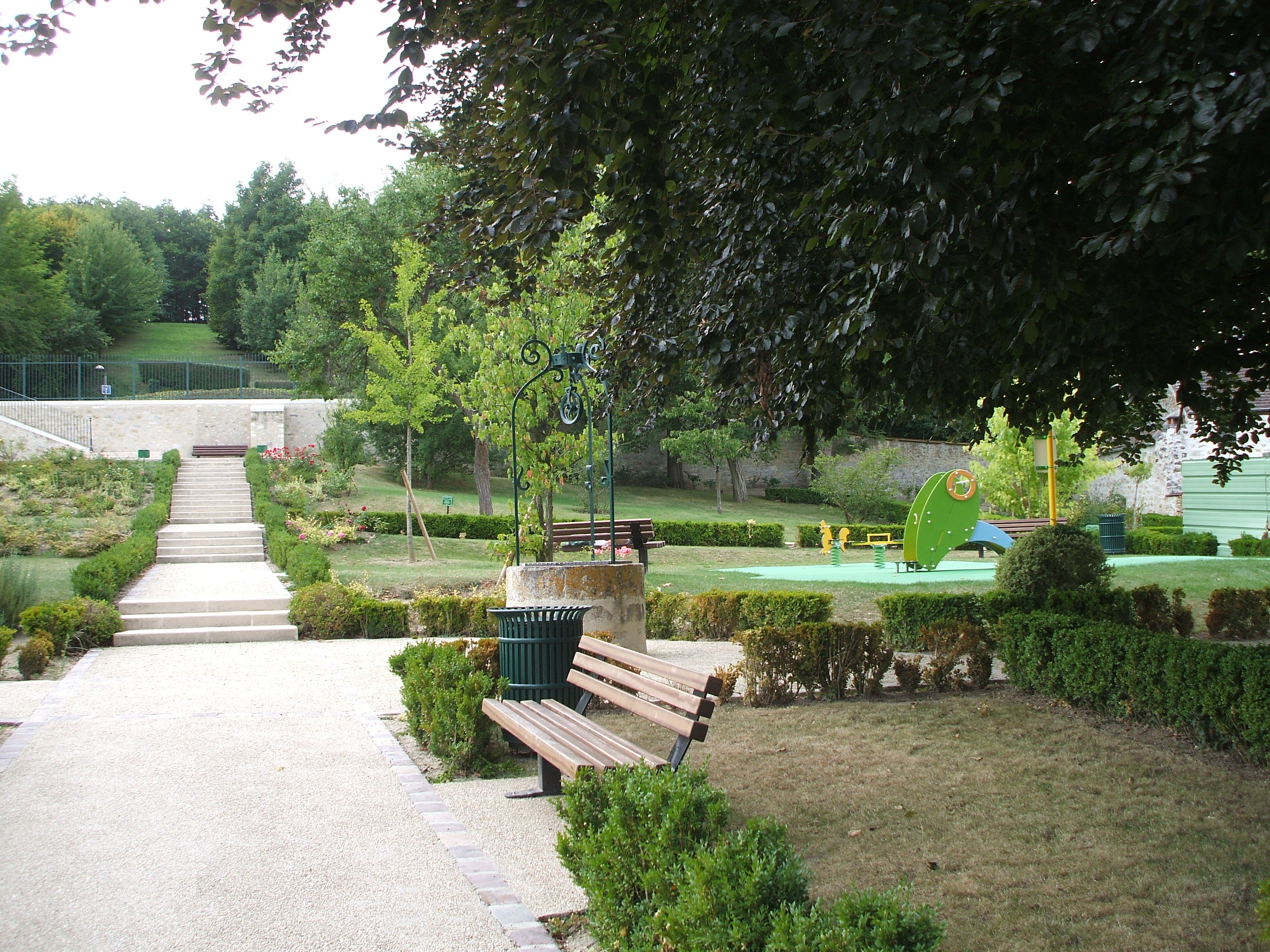
Jardin de Lapresté

== See also ==
- Communes of the Val-d'Oise department
