= Osny =

- Commune
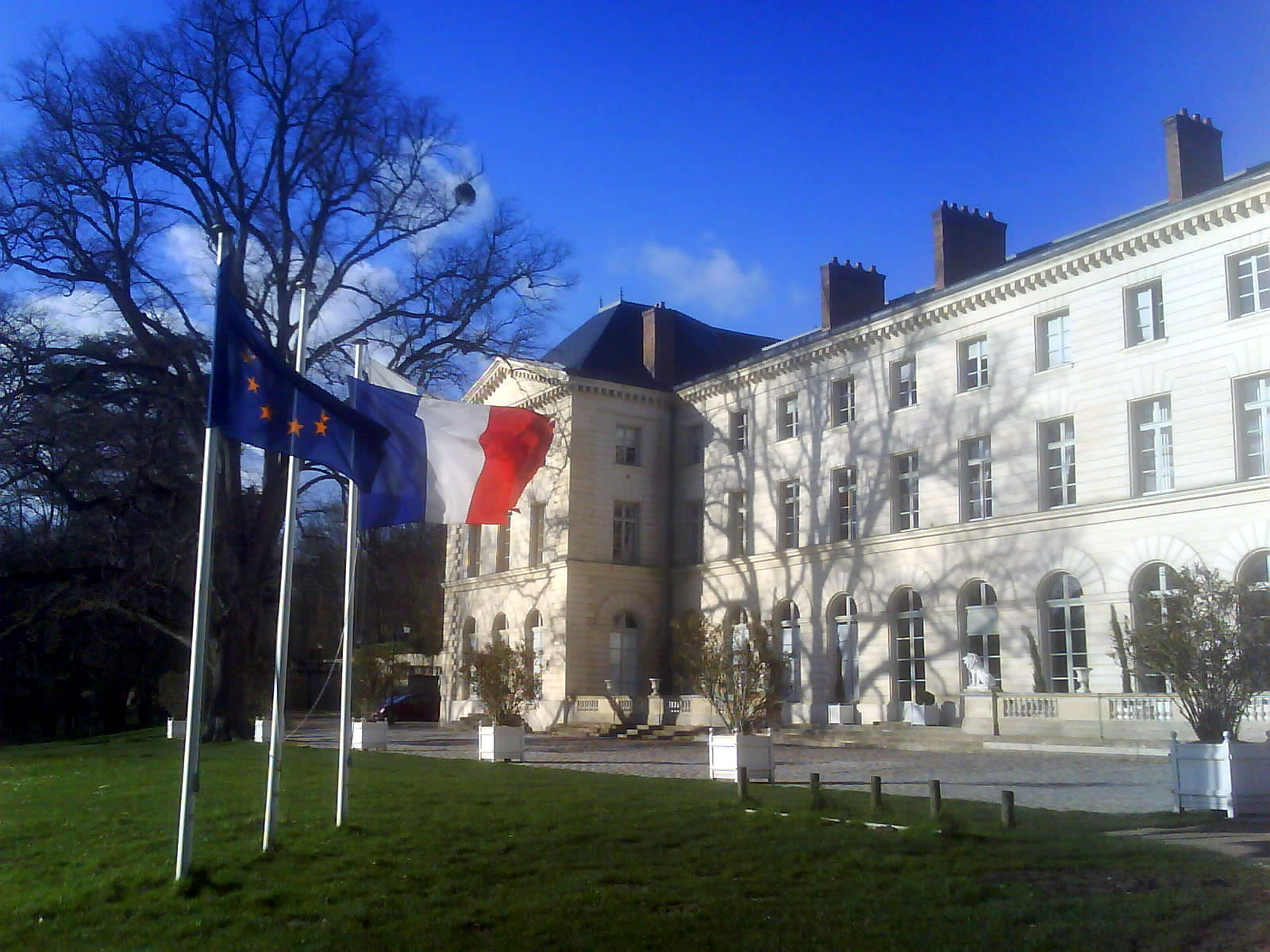
- The front of the Château d'Osny

- Coat of arms
- Location of Osny
- Location within France Location within Île-de-France (region)
- Coordinates: 49°03′36″N 2°03′48″E
- Country: France
- Region: Île-de-France
- Department: Val-d'Oise
- Arrondissement: Pontoise
- Canton: Cergy-1
- Intercommunality: Cergy-Pontoise

Government
  - Mayor (2020–2026): Jean-Michel Levesque
- Area^{1}: 12.52 km^{2} (4.83 sq mi)
- Highest elevation: 102 m (335 ft)
- Lowest elevation: 27 m (89 ft)
- Population (2023): 17,954
  - Density: 1,434/km^{2} (3,714/sq mi)
- Time zone: UTC+01:00 (CET)
  - Summer (DST): UTC+02:00 (CEST)
- INSEE/Postal code: 95476 /95520
- Website: www.osny.fr
- ^{1} French Land Register data, which excludes lakes, ponds, glaciers > 1 km^{2} (0.386 sq mi or 247 acres) and river estuaries.

Osny (French pronunciation: [oni]) is a commune in the Val-d'Oise department, in the northwestern suburbs of Paris, France. It is located 31.6 km (19.6 mi) from the center of Paris, in the "new town" of Cergy-Pontoise, created in the 1960s.

== Population ==
Historical population
Year	Pop.	±% p.a.
1968	3,905	—
1975	7,195	+9.12%
1982	10,736	+5.88%
1990	12,195	+1.61%
1999	14,309	+1.79%
2007	15,945	+1.36%
2012	16,366	+0.52%
2017	16,910	+0.66%
2023	17,954	+1.00%
Source: INSEE

== Transportation ==
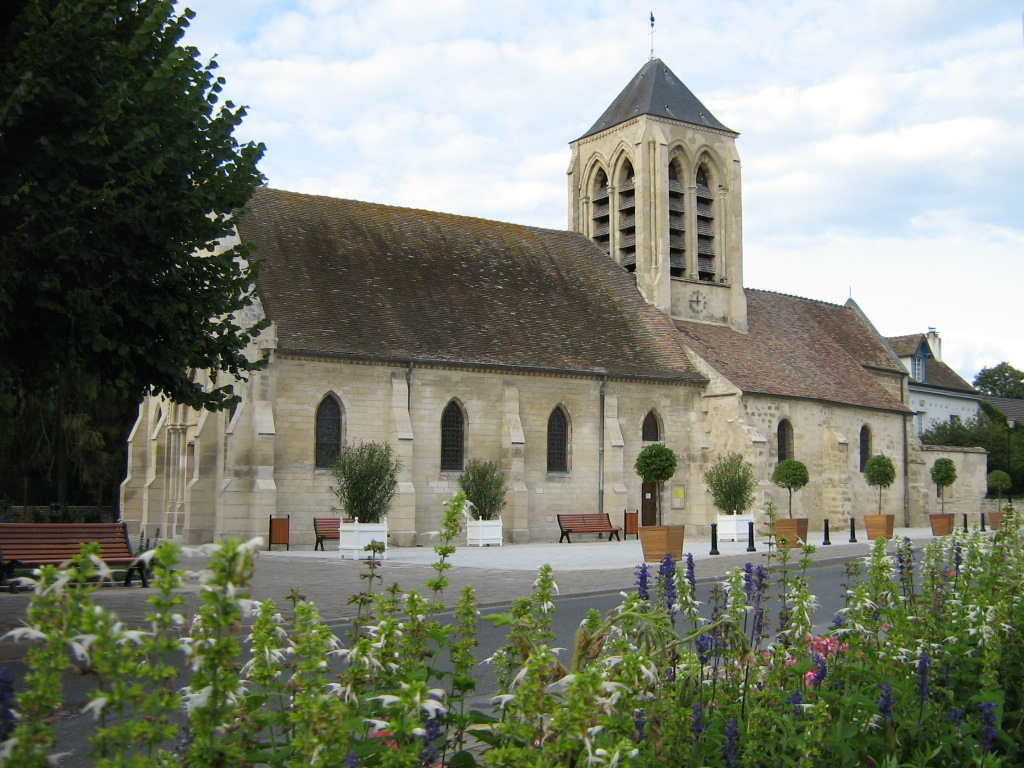
Osny's church

Osny is served by Osny station on the Transilien Paris-Saint-Lazare suburban rail line.

== Education ==
Schools include:

- Six public preschools (maternelles): Charcot, Lameth, La Ravinière, Les Vignes, Paul Roth, Yves Le Guern
- Six public elementary schools: d'Immarmont, La Ravinière, Lameth, Paul Roth, Saint-Exupéry, and Yves Le Guern
- Two private preschools and primary schools: École élémentaire Les Petits Pas and École maternelle et primaire du Petit Prince (Protestant school)
- One public junior high school (collège): la Bruyère
  - Collège Nicolas-Flamel is in nearby Pontoise; some Osny students go there since not everyone may be assigned to the junior high in Osny.
- One private junior high school: Collège Saint-Stanislas
- Two public senior high schools: Lycée Polyvalent Paul-Émile Victor and L’Institut de formation par alternance (IFA) Adolphe Chauvin
- One private senior high school: Lycée professionnel des industries graphiques « Notre famille »

== See also ==
- Communes of the Val-d'Oise department
