= Lycée Jules Verne (Cergy) =

Senior high school in France

Lycée Jules Verne is a senior high school in Cergy, Val-d'Oise, France, in the Paris metropolitan area.

It is located within the Cergy-le-Haut area.

As of 2016 it has more than 1,190 students.
