= Gargenville =

- Commune
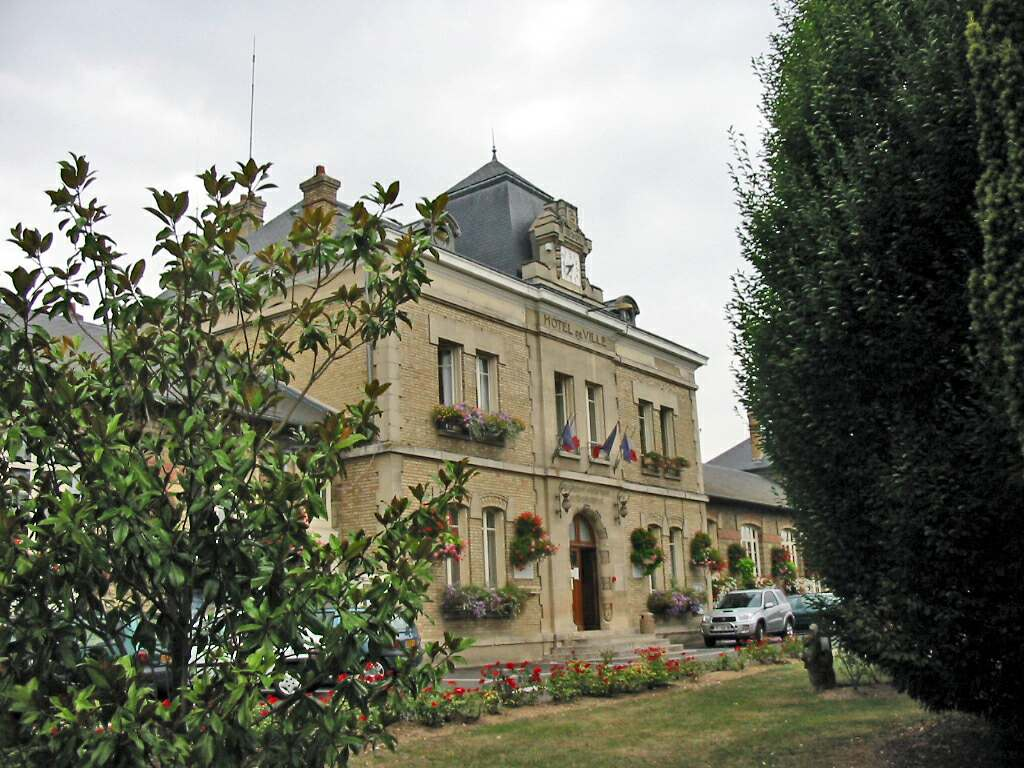
- The town hall in Gargenville

- Coat of arms
- Location of Gargenville
- Location within France Location within Île-de-France (region)
- Coordinates: 48°59′34″N 1°48′39″E
- Country: France
- Region: Île-de-France
- Department: Yvelines
- Arrondissement: Mantes-la-Jolie
- Canton: Limay
- Intercommunality: CU Grand Paris Seine et Oise

Government
  - Mayor (2026–2032): Yann Perron
- Area^{1}: 8.67 km^{2} (3.35 sq mi)
- Elevation: 150 m (490 ft)
- Highest elevation: 191 m (627 ft)
- Lowest elevation: 17 m (56 ft)
- Population (2023): 7,869
  - Density: 908/km^{2} (2,350/sq mi)
- Time zone: UTC+01:00 (CET)
  - Summer (DST): UTC+02:00 (CEST)
- INSEE/Postal code: 78267 /78440
- ^{1} French Land Register data, which excludes lakes, ponds, glaciers > 1 km^{2} (0.386 sq mi or 247 acres) and river estuaries.

Gargenville (French pronunciation: [ɡaʁʒɑ̃vil]) is a commune in the Yvelines department in the Île-de-France region in north-central France, 45 km to the center of Paris. It is part of the Parc naturel régional du Vexin français. With the neighborhing commune of Issou, it forms an urban area of around 10000 inhabitants.

Inhabitants are known in French as the Gargenvillois.

== History ==
The name Gargenville is referenced as Gargen villam in 1164, Gargenvilla in 1249, Girgenville in 1265, Gargenville in 1429. It comes from the gallic name Garganus and the gallo-romain suffix VILLA, "rural domain" (villa rustica in Latin).

Before the French Revolution, Gargenville was made of two fiefs, the domaine d'Hanneucourt and the Moufle de la Tuilerie. In 1790, they were merged to form the new commune, which then had 990 inhabitants.

== Population ==
Historical population
Year	Pop.	±% p.a.
1968	4,904	—
1975	4,663	−0.72%
1982	5,532	+2.47%
1990	6,202	+1.44%
1999	6,611	+0.71%
2007	6,732	+0.23%
2012	6,824	+0.27%
2017	7,467	+1.82%
2023	7,869	+0.88%
Source: INSEE

== Economy ==
The "Aciérie et Laminoir de Paris", now Alpa Riva electric steelworks, and various industries, including industrial waste treatment centers and quarries.

== Transportation ==
Public transportation is provided by Transilien on the Paris Saint Lazare to Mantes Station via Conflans-Sainte-Honorine line.

== Geography ==
=== Neighbouring communes ===
On the edge of the Seine, the territory is highly urbanized, in which residential areas and industries alternate. It forms an almost continuous agglomeration from Follainville-Dennemont in the west to Juziers in the east, and which continues beyond towards Meulan and Poissy. There are major communication routes: D191 departmental road, Paris-Mantes railway line on the north bank of the Seine, private or public port facilities, including the river-sea port of Limay-Porcheville which depends on the Autonomous Port of Paris.

This is where the industrial zones are located, notably with the Gargenville-Juziers cement plant, the Issou-Gargenville oil depot (ex-refinery), and the Porcheville thermal power plant.

The northern part of the canton, entirely included in the regional natural park, very wooded, more sparsely populated, is dedicated to traditional agriculture and forestry, crafts and tourism.

== See also ==
- Communes of the Yvelines department
