= Vexin =

Former French county

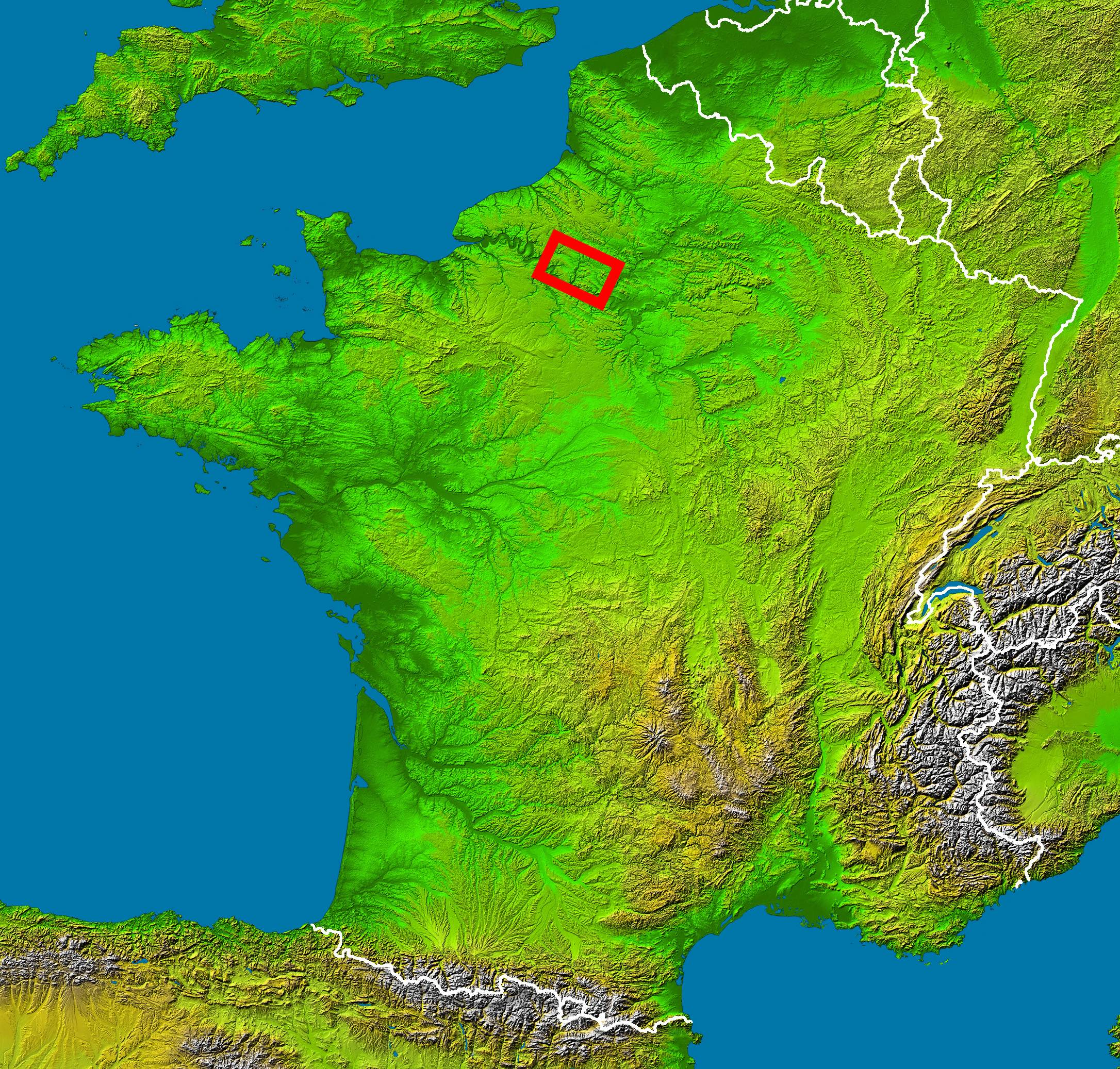
Map of France showing the general location of the historical county of Vexin

Map of France in 1180. Vexin is visible between Paris and Rouen.

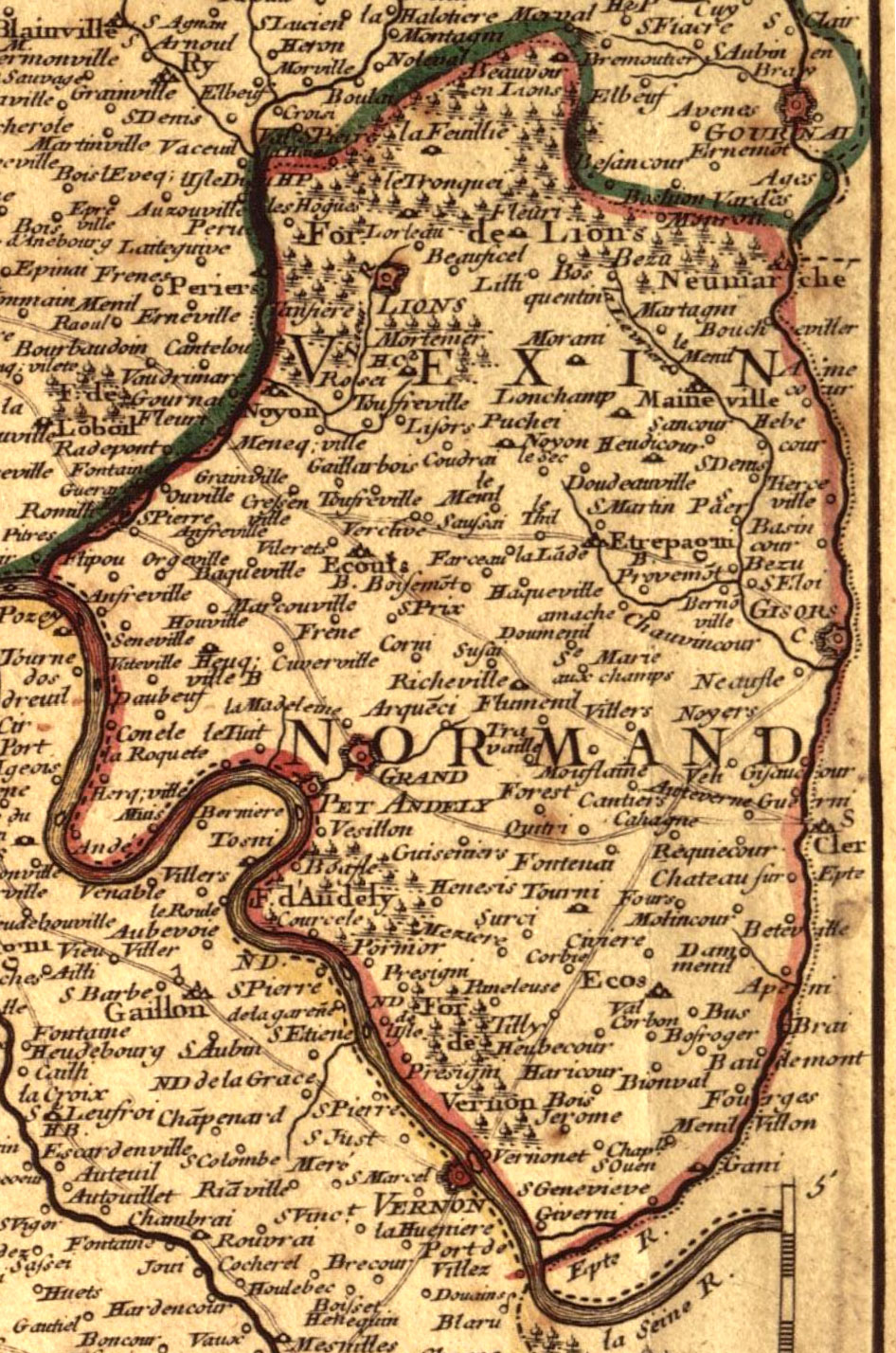
Map of Norman Vexin.

Vexin (French pronunciation: [vɛksɛ̃]) is a historical county of northern France. It covers a verdant plateau on the right bank (north) of the Seine running roughly east to west between Pontoise and Romilly-sur-Andelle (about 20 km from Rouen), and north to south between Auneuil and the Seine near Vernon. The plateau is crossed by the Epte and the Andelle river valleys.

== History ==
The name Vexin is derived from a name for a Gaulish tribe now known as the Veliocasses. They had inhabited the area and made Rouen their most important city.

=== Middle Ages ===
French Vexin: Azure semé-de-lis or, a label ermine.

Vexin was divided into two parts—the French Vexin in the east and the Norman Vexin in the west—under the Treaty of Saint-Clair-sur-Epte on 11 July 911. King Charles the Simple ceded to the Norman leader Rollo the territory between the Epte in the north, the Avre in the south, and the sea, laying the groundwork for the future Duchy of Normandy, which included part of Vexin, while the remainder stayed under the French king's control.

In 1031, Duke Robert I of Normandy aided King Henry I against a revolt led by the dowager queen, Constance of Arles, and was rewarded with the French Vexin between the Epte and Oise, including Pontoise.

The County of Vexin was held by a prominent feudal lord, Raoul de Gouy, who also controlled the counties of Amiens and Valois. In 1063, Gauthier III de Gouy was poisoned and died a prisoner of William the Bastard. His cousin Ralph IV of Valois succeeded him.

This division sparked centuries of conflict between the two neighbors, especially after the duke of Normandy became king of England in 1066, fueling the ambitions of both rulers.

In 1077 Ralph IV's only son, Simon de Vexin, entered a monastery. In 1082, King Philip I of France seized the opportunity to reclaim the French Vexin, previously granted by his father to the Duke of Normandy.

In 1087, William, back in Normandy, pillaged the French Vexin during the summer, clashing with King Philip I, and suffered a fatal injury during the assault on Mantes. (Note: William died in Rouen in September 1087.)

The Epte valley was then heavily fortified, with numerous military structures built by both the French king and the Norman duke. Notable surviving examples include Gisors, Neaufles-Saint-Martin, and Château-sur-Epte on the Norman side, and Trie-Château and La Roche-Guyon on the French side, along with the castle of Pontoise, the historic Vexin capital, where King Louis VI often resided. Nonetheless, these fortifications did little to prevent over a century of pillaging and devastation in the region.

In 1193, King Philip II of France captured Gisors, gaining control of the entire Duchy of Normandy a decade later after the death of King Richard I of England, and stripped the last major Vexin feudal lord, the count of Meulan, who had backed the English king, of his lands.

In 1195, Philip permanently annexed the French Vexin to the royal domain.

The 13th century and the first half of the 14th century were a time of peace and prosperity in Vexin, marked by the construction of numerous churches, extensive land clearing, and a significant population increase. Pontoise, with 2,150 fiscal hearths in 1332, ranked among the kingdom’s most prominent cities.

During the Hundred Years' War, the French Vexin was a battleground, notably during the Crécy campaign, which ravaged the region. The Black Death struck in 1348, killing 1,000 people in Pontoise. The Great Jacquerie, originating in the Beauvaisis, quickly spread to the Vexin countryside.

By the early 15th century, Pontoise and many villages lay in ruins, crops were neglected due to a lack of able-bodied men, and forests reclaimed cleared lands. The civil war between Armagnacs and Burgundians followed, with the latter garrisoning Pontoise in 1417. However, the English seized the city by surprise on 31 July 1419. Vexin remained under English control for seventeen years until 1449, when the château de Gisors was finally retaken, ending the war in the region.

"I have seen with my own eyes the vast plains of Champagne, Brie, Beauce..., Maine, Perche, Norman and French Vexin, Beauvaisis... deserted, fallow, depopulated, overgrown with brambles and bushes..." wrote Thomas Basin, Bishop of Lisieux, in his chronicle of King Charles VII of France.

With peace restored, a rebuilding fervor emerged, ushering in the era of Flamboyant Gothic. Wealthy bourgeois acquired lordships, replacing fortified castles with pleasure residences.

=== Renaissance ===
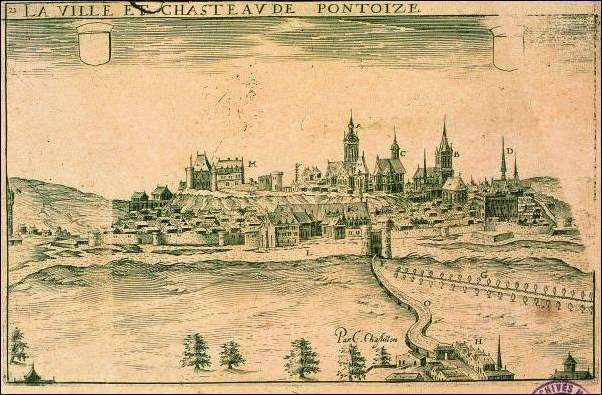
La ville et chasteau de Pontoise, engraving by C. Chastillon (16th century).

By around 1550, the French Vexin regained its 1332 population of approximately 25,000 people. Yet this renewed prosperity was short-lived, as the Wars of Religion erupted, spanning much of the latter half of the 16th century.

The Estates General of 1560 were convened in Pontoise by Chancellor Michel de L'Hôpital, but failed to restore peace. Several Vexin lords rejected the Reformation, turning the region into a stronghold of the Catholic League.

King Henry III, accompanied by Henry of Navarre, later Henry IV of France, laid siege to Pontoise on 8 July 1589, after retaking Meulan. The city surrendered, but Henry III was assassinated at Saint-Cloud weeks later. By 1590, the Duke of Mayenne, leader of the Holy League, retook Pontoise.

In 1594, Henry IV abjured Protestantism, prompting Pontoise to open its gates and restoring religious peace to Vexin.

Here's how Noël Taillepied described the French Vexin in 1586:

The Beauce has its wheat, the Parisis its plaster, Arles its muscat, Orléans its claret wine, Normandy its fruit, Picardy its forests, the Berry its sheep, Le Mans its capon, Melun its eels, Caudebec its smelt, Corbeil its peach, Cailly its watercress, Dijon its mustard, Lyon its chestnut, Limoux its combs, Toulouse its scissors, Moulins its knives, Langres its knives, and so each region has its particular commodity. But in general, Vexin land has meat and fish, land and water, wheat and vines, wood and meadow, ponds and rivers, small mountains and gentle valleys, lime and plaster, stone and brick, cities and castles, nobility and peasants, men in great numbers, and many species of animals. In short (as I must say), there is no land in the world better suited to sustaining human life, both for the serenity of its air and the abundance of provisions when times are good. This land stretches from the small river of Valmondois in L'Isle-Adam to another small river passing through Fleury, called the Andelle, five leagues from Rouen. This land is called in Latin "Pagus Belgassinus" (as is also the land near Troyes in Champagne, called "Trecassinum"), in French, Vequecin, corrupted over time from Belgassin…

=== 17th century and 18th century ===
The Vexin drew little attention during the 17th century. Life resumed its course, interrupted only by successive plague waves in 1625, 1630, 1636, and 1642, followed by the Fronde from 1648 to 1652. The 18th century was notably prosperous: 80% of the territory was under plow, with a three-year crop rotation alternating wheat, oats, and fallow. Wheat yields reached 15 quintals per hectare. Pasture was also significant, supporting around 30,000 sheep and 7,000 to 8,000 cows, though natural meadows covered just 4% of the area. Forests shrank to their smallest extent, occupying only 8% of the land. The region was then dominated by about 400 large farmers, to whom the clergy and nobility had delegated land, mills, and tax collection.

=== French Revolution and the 19th century ===
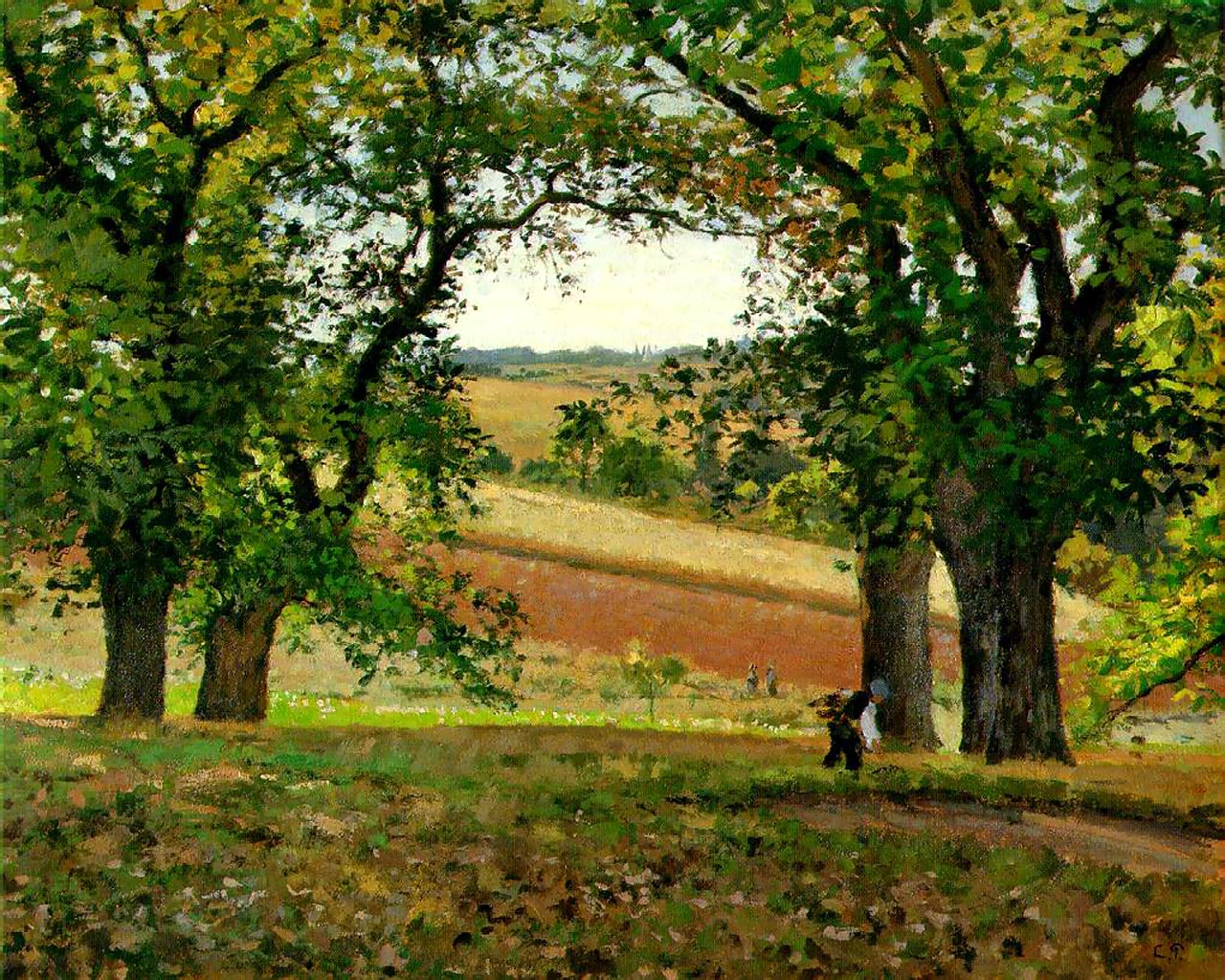
Pissarro - Les châtaigniers à Osny.

The French Revolution brought fewer upheavals to the Vexin than elsewhere, though the bourgeoisie grew wealthier by purchasing national property.

Potatoes began to be widely cultivated, and sugar beet production spurred the construction of sugar refineries and distilleries.

The railway arrived in the mid-19th century with the Paris-Dieppe line, followed by secondary lines like Valmondois-Marines. It enabled Vexin farmers to sell their produce more easily in Parisian markets and brought affordable goods from other regions, gradually phasing out local vineyards. Yet the 19th century largely bypassed the Vexin during the Industrial Revolution. A few factories emerged (e.g., in Bray-et-Lû), but they remained scarce, and the population stagnated. Villages ceased growing after the Revolution: the French Vexin had 29,928 inhabitants in 1790, close to its medieval figures, rising to 30,453 in 1876 and 32,195 in 1962. It has since remained a distinctly agricultural region.

Late in the century, landscape painters, followed by Impressionists, set up their easels in the Vexin countryside, especially along the Oise valley: Daubigny in Auvers-sur-Oise, then Pissarro in Pontoise and Éragny-sur-Epte, Claude Monet in Vétheuil, later joined by Cézanne and van Gogh in Auvers-sur-Oise, immortalizing the Vexin landscapes worldwide. Other post-Impressionists, like Georges William Thornley in Osny, also settled there.

=== World War II ===
During the liberation of Vexin, German troops in the forests of Marainville, Montgison, and Longues carried out a surprise attack against the American defenders in attempt to reoccupy the village of Fontenay-Saint-Père. Beginning 20 August 1944, fighting broke out, with about 30,000 troops engaged in total; in the nine days of fighting, multiple offensives and counter-offensives were carried out across the city. This eventually ended when a reinforced American army managed to defeat the German battalion.

In total, there were about 50 casualties on the American side, and several hundred on the German side. However, most of the casualties came from the inhabitants of the area, with an estimated loss of 2,500 civilians. There were around 3,000 casualties in total during the fighting, but the victory at Fontenay allowed the American troops to lead a successful counteroffensive, and eventually led to the liberation of Vexin on 30 August 1944.

A monument in honor of the liberation is depicted on three plaques. The leftmost plaque lists the names of the American soldiers lost, the middle one contains the commemoration messages, and the rightmost plaque commemorates the civilians lost. The memorial was inaugurated on September 5, 2021.

== Geography ==
Today, the county's territory is shared by parts of five departments of France: Val-d'Oise and Yvelines in the Île-de-France region; Oise in the Hauts-de-France region; and Eure and Seine-Maritime in the Normandy region. The major towns are Pontoise, Vernon, Meulan-en-Yvelines, Gisors, and Les Andelys. The plateau is primarily an agricultural region with some manufacturing located in the valleys.

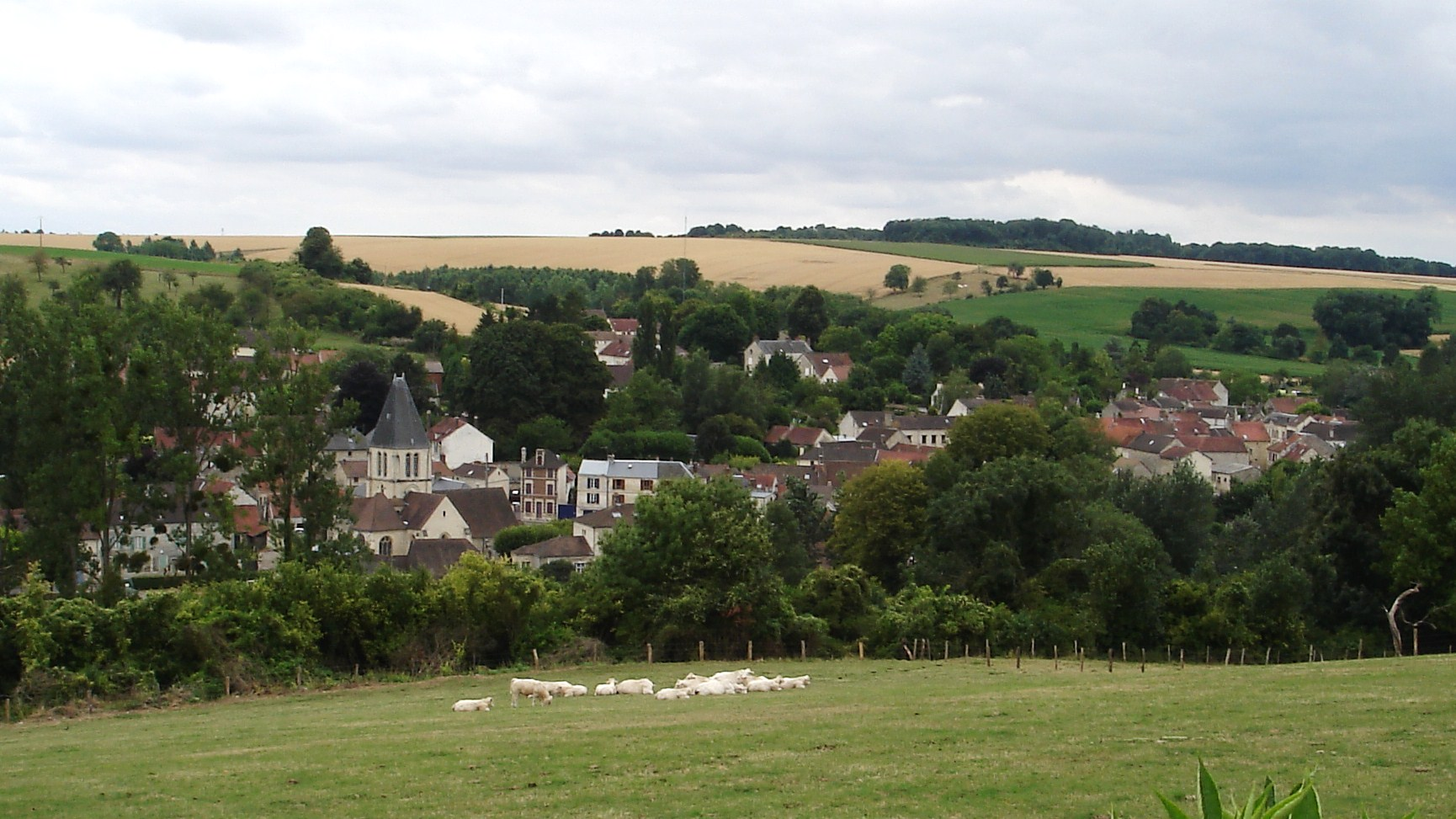
Chaussy, a typical village nestled in one of Vexin's valleys, surrounded by fields and woods.

The French Vexin, much like its counterpart the Norman Vexin, is predominantly a limestone plateau covered with loam, characterized by open spaces and an elevation ranging from approximately 100 to 140 metres (330 to 460 ft). It is topped by wooded hills and primarily devoted to agriculture (large-scale cereal farming). The region is distinctly bounded to the south by the meanders of the Seine, which have carved steep valleys in some areas. Roughly rectangular in shape, measuring about 40 by 35 kilometres (25 by 22 mi), it is geographically defined by relatively entrenched waterways:

- to the south by the Seine;
- to the east by the Oise;
- to the west by the Epte;
- to the north by the valleys of the Esches, the Troesne, or simply by the cuesta of Vexin.

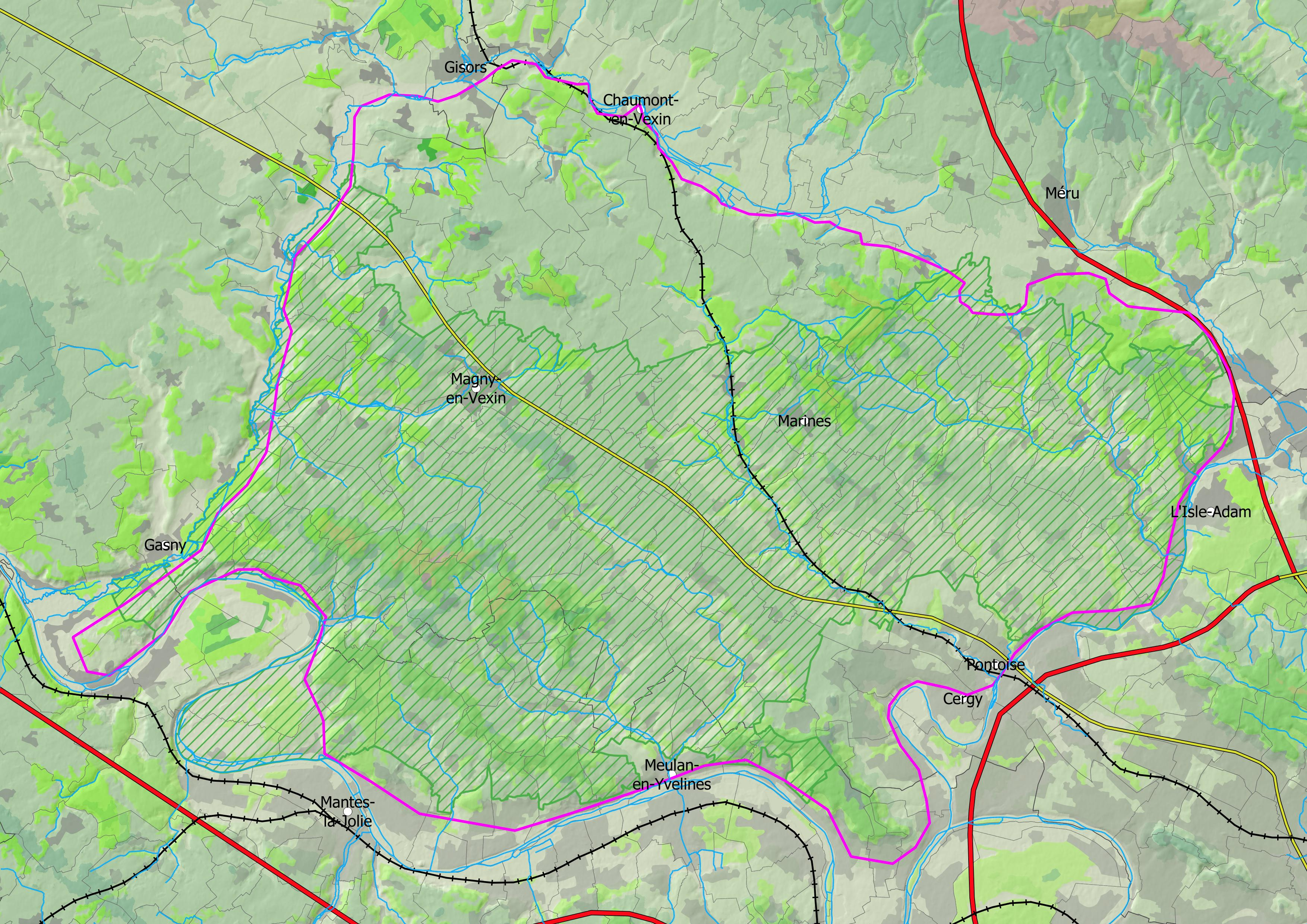
Topographic map of the French Vexin.

In the Oise, the boundaries of the French Vexin are theoretically marked by the cuesta of Vexin, separating the Vexin plateau from the neighboring Pays de Thelle plateau. However, some villages beyond this boundary—on the slopes of the cuesta, in the valleys of the Troesne or Esches, or even further—are often considered part of Vexin, sometimes bearing the name itself. Among these villages outside the strict geographical limits, a few rarely exhibit the typical landscape and architectural features of Vexin. Nonetheless, they are included in the count under the administrative organization section below. The northern and eastern Picard boundaries of the French Vexin are the least defined, with the others clearly outlined by significant rivers (Seine, Oise, and Epte), leading to uncertainties in classifying certain communes, a common challenge when delineating natural regions.

The interior of the plateau is dominated by a series of inliers and watered by several streams, tributaries of the aforementioned rivers:

- the Sausseron and the Viosne, tributaries of the Oise;
- the Montcient and the Aubette de Meulan, direct tributaries of the Seine;
- the Aubette de Magny and the Troesne, tributaries of the Epte.

The valleys vary widely in appearance, ranging from broad alluvial plains like the Aubette de Magny to long, relatively entrenched valleys like the Viosne.

Seven of the fourteen hills form a ridge line separating the northern plateau from the Seine valley to the south, stretching from the Massif de l'Hautil in the east to the former forest of Arthies in the west. The remaining hills are scattered and isolated across the plateau. Most consist of gypsum capped with a hard, barren gritstone, making them largely wooded. Some denuded hills host villages on their summits (Cléry-en-Vexin, Grisy-les-Plâtres) or slopes (Bréançon).

Gypsum was mined as early as the High Middle Ages, notably at Grisy-les-Plâtres.

The Buttes de Rosne, in the north, mark the highest point of the Vexin and the second highest in the entire Île-de-France region, at 216 metres (709 ft).

The region is overwhelmingly rural with a low population density, except for the urbanized valleys of the Seine and Oise, which form its southern and eastern boundaries and are influenced by nearby urban centers. These include Rouen to the west, Paris to the east, and closer towns like Vernon and Mantes-la-Jolie to the south, as well as the new town of Cergy-Pontoise to the southeast, with a population of 200,000 habitants and over 90,000 jobs, encompassing the historic Vexin capital, Pontoise.

The main town of the neighboring Norman Vexin, Gisors, has about 10,000 habitants and exerts some economic influence over the northern French Vexin. However, its location in the neighboring Eure department and Normandy region reduces its pull. The only notable agglomerations within the French Vexin are generally on the plateau's periphery: the small town of Chaumont-en-Vexin in the northeast, the Cergy-Pontoise agglomeration in the east, and Meulan-en-Yvelines and Limay in the south. Magny-en-Vexin, due to its relatively central position, is emerging as the modest capital of the agricultural plateau, with a pronounced commercial role.

The landscape is marked by a significant concentration of the population in villages, a trend that has intensified over centuries, with isolated hamlets and farms accounting for just 5% of the total population.

The primary communication route is the Route Nationale 14, linking Paris to Rouen via Pontoise. Its fairly straight path follows an ancient Roman road, the Chaussée Jules César.

A regional nature park was established in the area in 1995.

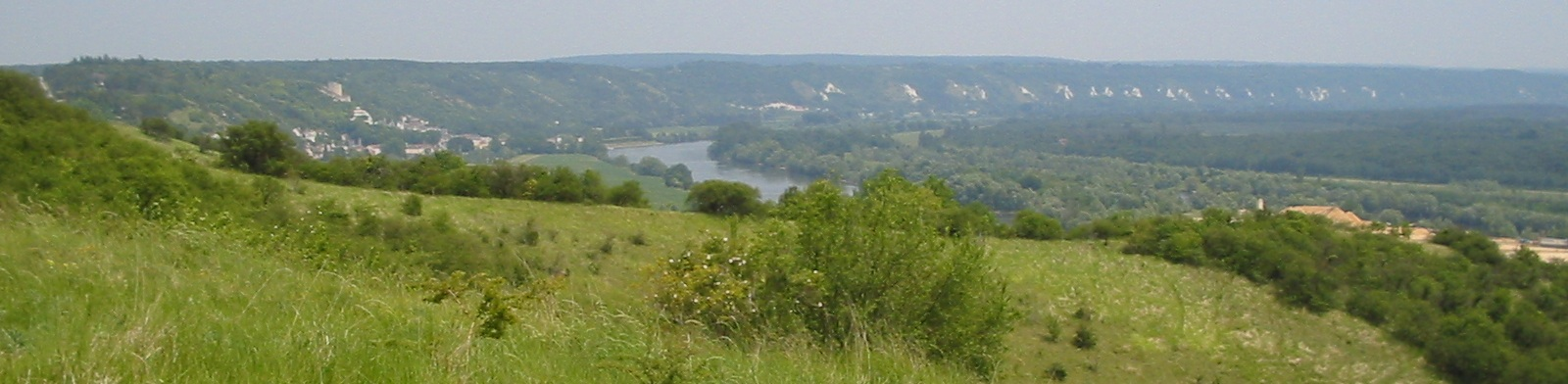
View of the Vexin region and the Seine river valley from La Roche-Guyon

== Administrative organization ==
Given the less defined northern boundaries in the Oise, the French Vexin encompasses 167 communes. These span two regions and three departments: in Île-de-France, the Yvelines (31 communes) and Val-d'Oise (88 communes), and in Hauts-de-France, the Oise (47 communes).

Administratively, the territory overlaps four arrondissements: the Arrondissement of Pontoise (Val-d'Oise), the Arrondissement of Mantes-la-Jolie (Yvelines), the Arrondissement of Saint-Germain-en-Laye (Yvelines), and the Arrondissement of Beauvais (Oise).

Regarding cantons, the French Vexin includes all or parts of the following (pre-2014 boundaries):

- in Val-d’Oise: the Canton of Vigny (all 18 communes), the Canton of Magny-en-Vexin (all 26 communes), the Canton of Marines (all 19 communes), the Canton of Vallée-du-Sausseron (all 12 communes), the Canton of Hautil (5 of 6 communes, Neuville-sur-Oise being on the Oise's left bank), the Canton of Cergy-Nord (all 4 communes), the Canton of Cergy-Sud (a fraction of Cergy, already counted, and Éragny, outside the geographic scope), the Canton of Beaumont-sur-Oise (2 communes on the Oise's right bank, the other 6 on the left or beyond the Esches), the Canton of L’Isle-Adam (only Parmain on the Oise's right bank), and the Canton of Pontoise (solely Pontoise);
- in Oise: the Canton of Méru (9 of 20 communes, split by Vexin's river boundaries), the Canton of Chaumont-en-Vexin (all 37 communes), and the Canton of Coudray-Saint-Germer (only Flavacourt of 18);
- in Yvelines: the Canton of Andrésy (all 3 communes), the Canton of Poissy-Nord (only Carrières-sous-Poissy on the Seine's right bank), and the Canton of Triel-sur-Seine (only Triel-sur-Seine on the Seine's right bank) in the Arrondissement of Saint-Germain-en-Laye; and the Canton of Bonnières-sur-Seine (3 communes on the Seine's right bank), the Canton of Limay (all 17 communes), and the Canton of Meulan-en-Yvelines (7 of 9 communes) in the Arrondissement of Mantes-la-Jolie.

=== Intercommunal structures ===
Some French Vexin communes have formed agglomerations or communal associations, including all or part of the following:

- In Val-d’Oise
  - the Cergy-Pontoise agglomeration community (9 of 13 communes)
  - the Communauté de communes de la Vallée de l’Oise et des Trois Forêts (2 of 7 communes)
  - the Communauté de communes de la Vallée de l’Oise et des impressionnistes (3 of 6 communes)
  - the Communauté de communes Vexin Centre (all 34 communes)
  - the Communauté de communes Sausseron Impressionnistes (all 12 communes)
  - the Communauté de communes Vexin - Val de Seine (all 26 communes)
  - the Communauté de communes du Haut Val-d’Oise (1 of 8 communes)
- In Yvelines
  - the Communauté d’agglomération Seine et Vexin (all 17 communes)
  - the Communauté d’agglomération de Mantes-en-Yvelines (8 of 35 communes)
  - the Communauté d’agglomération des Deux Rives de Seine (4 of 12 communes)
  - the Communauté de communes des Portes de l’Île-de-France (2 of 9 communes)
  - the Communauté de communes des Coteaux du Vexin (all 3 communes)

The commune of Maurecourt belongs to the Cergy-Pontoise agglomeration community.

- In Oise
  - the Communauté de communes des Sablons (9 of 25 communes)
  - the Communauté de communes du Vexin-Thelle (37 of 42 communes)
  - the Communauté de communes du Pays de Bray (only Flavacourt of 23 communes)

== Economy and regional natural park ==
Most rural communes of the French Vexin united in 1995 to form the French Vexin Regional Natural Park, headquartered in Théméricourt. It includes 94 communes (77 in Val-d’Oise and 17 in Yvelines) plus six gateway towns, covering 680 square kilometres (260 sq mi) with 79,000 inhabitants.

The Picardy communes in the Oise remained outside the park, as managing a park across two regions (Île-de-France and Picardy) seemed too complex at the time (despite precedents like the Normandy-Maine Regional Natural Park, established in 1975). In Val-d’Oise, two communes (Ambleville and La Chapelle-en-Vexin) initially declined to join but did so in 2008, alongside three Yvelines communes (Évecquemont, Vaux-sur-Seine, and Juziers).

In 2004, the park's territory recorded 13,497 jobs in the private sector, including 11,056 in Val-d’Oise and 2,441 in Yvelines.

== In popular culture ==
Ownership of Vexin, and the court intrigue related to securing it, is a key plot point in James Goldman's play The Lion in Winter (1966). It also features in the Angevin novels of Sharon Kay Penman, and in the BBC series The Devil's Crown (1978), which stars Brian Cox.
