= Brueil-en-Vexin =

- Commune
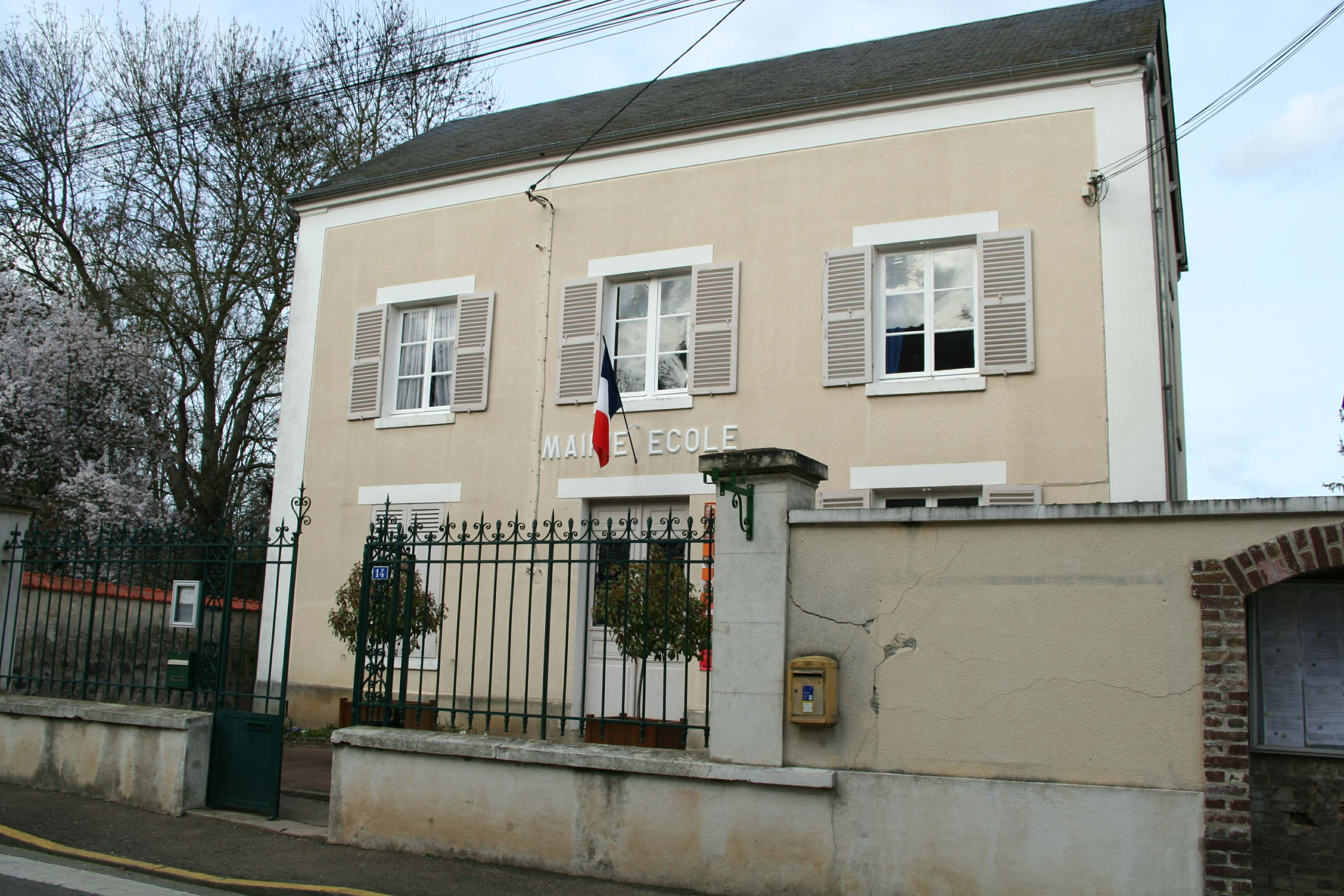
- Town hall
- Location of Brueil-en-Vexin
- Location within France Location within Île-de-France (region)
- Coordinates: 49°01′55″N 1°49′12″E
- Country: France
- Region: Île-de-France
- Department: Yvelines
- Arrondissement: Mantes-la-Jolie
- Canton: Limay
- Intercommunality: CU Grand Paris Seine et Oise

Government
  - Mayor (2020–2026): Martine Tellier
- Area^{1}: 7.34 km^{2} (2.83 sq mi)
- Elevation: 60 m (200 ft)
- Highest elevation: 192 m (630 ft)
- Lowest elevation: 62 m (203 ft)
- Population (2023): 652
  - Density: 88.8/km^{2} (230/sq mi)
- Time zone: UTC+01:00 (CET)
  - Summer (DST): UTC+02:00 (CEST)
- INSEE/Postal code: 78113 /78440
- ^{1} French Land Register data, which excludes lakes, ponds, glaciers > 1 km^{2} (0.386 sq mi or 247 acres) and river estuaries.

Brueil-en-Vexin (French pronunciation: [bʁyɛj ɑ̃ vɛksɛ̃], literally Brueil in Vexin) is a commune in the Yvelines department in the Île-de-France region in north-central France.

== See also ==
- Communes of the Yvelines department
