= Linguasphere Observatory =

Transnational linguistic research network

Logo

The Linguasphere Observatory (or the Observatoire, based on its original French and legal title: Observatoire Linguistique) is a non-profit transnational research network, devoted (alongside related programs) to the gathering, study, classification, editing and free distribution online of the updatable text (initially in English) of a fully indexed and comprehensive Linguasphere Register of the World's Languages, and Speech Communities.

== History ==
The Observatoire was created in Quebec in 1983 and was subsequently established and registered in Normandy as a non-profit association under the honorary presidency of the late Léopold Sédar Senghor, a French-language poet and the first president of Senegal. Its founding director is David Dalby, former director of the International African Institute and emeritus reader in the University of London, and its first research secretary was Philippe Blanchet, a Provençal-language poet currently serving as Professor of Sociolinguistics at the University of Rennes. Since 2010, the deputy director and webmaster of the Observatoire has been Pierrick le Feuvre, with the chairman of its research council being Roland Breton, emeritus professor at the University of Paris VIII. The Observatoire's research hub is currently based in the preserved county of Dyfed, Wales and, in the European Union, in Normandy, France. Its title in Welsh is Wylfa Ieithoedd lit. 'Observatory of languages', together with its publishing program (Welsh Gwasg y Byd Iaith lit. 'Press of the world of language').

The Observatoire developed an innovative scheme of philological classification, coding all living and recorded languages within a global referential framework or "linguascale". This Linguascale Framework uses a decimal structure (see below) to record both genetic and geographic categories of relationship (termed phylozones and geozones, respectively).

In 1999/2000, the Observatoire published its first 2-volume Linguasphere Register of the World's Languages and Speech Communities. Reviews were published by Edward J. Vajda in Language and by Anthony P. Grant in Journal of the Royal Anthropological Society.

The Observatoire prepared a revised edition of the Linguasphere Register from 2010, the first of a projected series of regular updates at 10-year intervals. The current edition (LS-2010), comprising substantial materials from the foundation edition of 2000, is published online from 2011 as a freely available public resource and an online data-base, compiled and co-ordinated by David Dalby and Pierrick le Feuvre. Provision is made for the online gathering of additional and improved data, and for the open discussion of proposals and criticisms.

From 2001 until December 2005, the Linguasphere Observatory was actively involved in collaboration with the British Standards Institution BSI Group and with ISO/TC 37in the design and development of a four-letter (alpha-4) code covering—potentially—every recorded language variety in the world. The Observatoire was not, however, associated with or responsible for the final ISO 639-6 standard which was a partial result of this collaboration, approved and published by ISO in 2009. It is the policy of the Observatoire that its on-going independent work on language coding should also be complementary to and supportive of the ISO 639 international standards,

== The Linguasphere Register and Linguascale referential framework ==
The Linguascale framework is a referential system covering all languages, as published in the Linguasphere Register in 2000 and subsequently refined in 2010. It comprises a flexible coding formula which seeks to situate each language and dialect within the totality of the world's living and recorded languages, having regard to ongoing linguistic research.

The first part of this linguascale is the decimal classification referred to above, consisting of a linguasphere key of two numerals denoting the relevant phylozone or geozone: from 00. to 99. This provides a systematic numerical key for the initial classification of any of the world's languages, following the principles set out in the Linguasphere Register. The first numeral of the key represents one of the ten referential sectors into which the world's languages are initially divided. The sector can either be a phylosector, in which the constituent languages are considered to be in a diachronic relationship one with another, or a geosector, in which languages are grouped geographically rather than historically.

The second numeral is used to represent the ten zones into which each geosector is divided for referential purposes. The component zones, like the sectors, are described as either phylozones or geozones, based on the nature of the relationship among their constituent languages: either historical or geographical.

The second part of the linguascale consists of three capital letters (majuscules): from -AAA- to -ZZZ-. Each zone is divided into one or more sets, with each set being represented by the first majuscule of this three-letter (alpha-3) component. Each set is divided into one or more chains (represented by the second majuscule) and each chain is into one or more nets (represented by the third majuscule). The division of the languages of a zone into sets, chains and nets is based on relative degrees of linguistic proximity, as measured in principle by approximate proportions of shared basic vocabulary. Geozones are on average divided into more sets than phylozones because relationships among languages within the latter are by definition more obvious and much closer.

The third and final part of the linguascale consists of up to three lowercase letters (minuscules), used to identify a language or dialect with precision: from aaa to zzz. The first letter of this sequence represents an outer unit (preferred from 2010 to the original term of "outer language", to avoid the shifting and often emotive applications of the terms "language" and "dialect"). The inner units and language varieties that may comprise any outer unit are coded using a second, and wherever necessary a third minuscule letter.

=== Examples ===
The application of the linguascale may be illustrated with the concrete examples below, chosen from within the English language.

For example,

- The code covering all forms of English is 52-ABA, where 5= represents the Indo-European phylosector, 52= represents the Germanic phylozone, 52-A represents the Norsk+ Frysk set (a compound-name chosen to cover the contents of the Germanic phylozone), 52-AB represents the English+ Anglo-Creole chain, and 52-ABA is the English net. Within this net, the outer units are:
  - 52-ABA-a – Scots+ Northumbrian.
  - 52-ABA-b – "Anglo-English" (the traditional localised varieties of southern Great Britain and also Ireland).
  - 52-ABA-c – Global English (varieties of modern English as spoken and written around the world).
- Some more specific examples of English varieties are:
  - 52-ABA-abb is the Geordie traditional variety: belonging to 52-ABA-a Scots+ Northumbrian outer language, and 52-ABA-ab Northumbrian.
  - 52-ABA-bco is the Norfolk traditional variety: belonging to 52-ABA-b "Anglo-English" outer unit, and specifically to 52-ABA-bc Southern (British) traditional English.
  - 52-ABA-cof covers the range of (non-creolised) Nigerian English : belonging to 52-ABA-c Global English outer unit, and 52-ABA-co West-African English. Nigerian English is thus distinguished from the often overlapping 52-ABB-bf Enpi (or "NP", from the abbreviation of so-called "Nigerian Pijin"): belonging to 52-ABB Anglo-Creole net, and 52-ABB-b Wes-kos (West Coast Anglo-Creole).

=== Languages of London ===
A practical application of the Linguasphere Register and its linguascale in the study of a complex urban linguistic environment has been as the referential framework for successive surveys of over 200 languages other than English spoken by plurilingual children at state schools in London (representing just under 40% of the total number of children attending), as edited in 2000 by Baker and Eversley and in 2010 by Eversley et al.

=== See also ===
- Language code with tabulated example of coding systems (for English and Spanish), including ISO 639 and Linguasphere.

== "Langues de la Liberté/Languages of Liberty" ==
In Paris, from 1987, the Observatoire linguistique created a bilingual exhibition Langues de la Liberté / Languages of Liberty, tracing the transnational development of certain basic concepts of personal freedom through the interaction of English and French, rather than by the action of any one nation. At the outset of a series of 34 illustrated triptychs, attention was drawn to the historical role of other transnational languages in the development of such concepts, including Greek and German.

The exhibition was sponsored by the government of a bilingual nation, Canada, by the international francophone Agence (ACCT) and by the region of Haute-Normandie. It was inaugurated in Paris at the Centre Georges Pompidou on 6 June 1989, and presented there throughout the summer of 1989 as the official Canadian contribution to the bicentenary celebrations of the French Revolution.

At the subsequent presentation of this bilingual exhibition at the Hôtel de Région in Rouen (Haute-Normandie), from 23 September to 21 October 1989, the Observatoire linguistique organised the first public display of the only surviving contemporary copy of the vernacular (and arguably pre-Latin) text of England's Magna Carta, written in 13th century French.

Thanks to continued support from Canada, the exhibition was subsequently presented by the Observatoire in Belgium and England, at the Palais des Congrès in Liège and at the Commonwealth Institute in London in 1990, and finally in Australia, at Old Parliament House, Canberra in May 1991.

In the context of the need to design a plurilingual framework of ethics for a future planetary society, the Observatoire announced its intention to return to the transnational theme of Magna Carta in 2015, on the occasion of the 8th centenary of the signing of its formal Latin version at Runnymede in 2020.

== "In the galaxy of languages, each person's voice is a star" ==
The motto of the Observatoire linguistique dates from 1990—in French: Dans la galaxie des langues, la voix de chaque personne est une étoile (translated into English as above).

The Observatoire adopted these words as its guiding philosophy on the occasion of the first series of debates organised by the Observatoire linguistique in 1990–1991, at Fleury-sur-Andelle in Haute-Normandie, at Maillane in Provence and at Huy in Wallonie, sponsored by each of the relevant regions, on the subject of Nos langues et l'unité de l'Europe ("Our languages and the unity of Europe"). The guest of honour at the first of these debates was André Martinet (1908–1999), doyen of trans-Atlantic linguistics.

From the year 2000 UNESCO adopted and adapted the Observatoire's motto in the form: "In the galaxy of languages, each word is a star".

== See also ==
- Ethnologue
- Language observatory
