= Route nationale 14 =

Trunk road in France

The Route nationale 14, N14, is a trunk road (nationale) in France between Paris and Rouen, running through Pontoise, Magny-en-Vexin, Saint-Clair-sur-Epte and Fleury-sur-Andelle. Until the 1950s, it was going until Le Havre through Yvetot.

== Route ==
=== Paris to Pontoise, km 0 to km 32 ===
The N14 begins at Paris' Porte de Clignancourt (Paris Métro). It heads north and has now been classified the RD14 as it heads through Paris' northern suburbs. The road passes to the west of Saint-Denis. The road crosses the A86 autoroute and meets the banks of the River Seine. The road then turns Northwest to Épinay-sur-Seine where the road becomes the RD14 again where through traffic is directed onto the A15 autoroute. The old N14 is then named Boulevard Charles de Gaulle which becomes the Boulevard du Havre.

Following this, the road runs through various towns in Val d'Oise, such as Pierrelaye, then crosses the River Oise where it enters the city of Pontoise. The D14 continues West where it merges with the A15 autoroute at Osny and becomes the N14 again, leaving Paris and entering le Vexin Français.

=== Pontoise to Rouen, km 32 to km 124 ===
The route followed by the N14 between Pontoise and Rouen is linear. Except at Saint-Clair-sur-Epte where a sharp downward gradient brings the road to the level of the River Epte, it course follows Caesar's Road, or Chaussée Jules César, from beginning to end. After the bypass town of Magny-en-Vexin and Saint-Gervais, the dual-carriageway ends. Then, the only section of dual-carriageway until Rouen is the bypass of Saint-Clair-sur-Epte and Bordeaux-Saint-Clair. The road continues through the Les Thilliers-en-Vexin, Écouis and Fleury-sur-Andelle.

The road continues West and re-enters the Seine valley as it approaches the capital of Normandy, Rouen. Rouen is on the junction of the A28 autoroute (Abbeville to Le Mans) and Route nationale 15 (Bonnières-sur-Seine to Le Havre). The section Rouen - Yvetot - Le Havre of the Route nationale 15 is the former itinerary of the RN 14.

== History ==
The road follows the course of the Roman road La Chaussée Jules César linking Paris to Normandy.
