= Lainville-en-Vexin =

- Commune
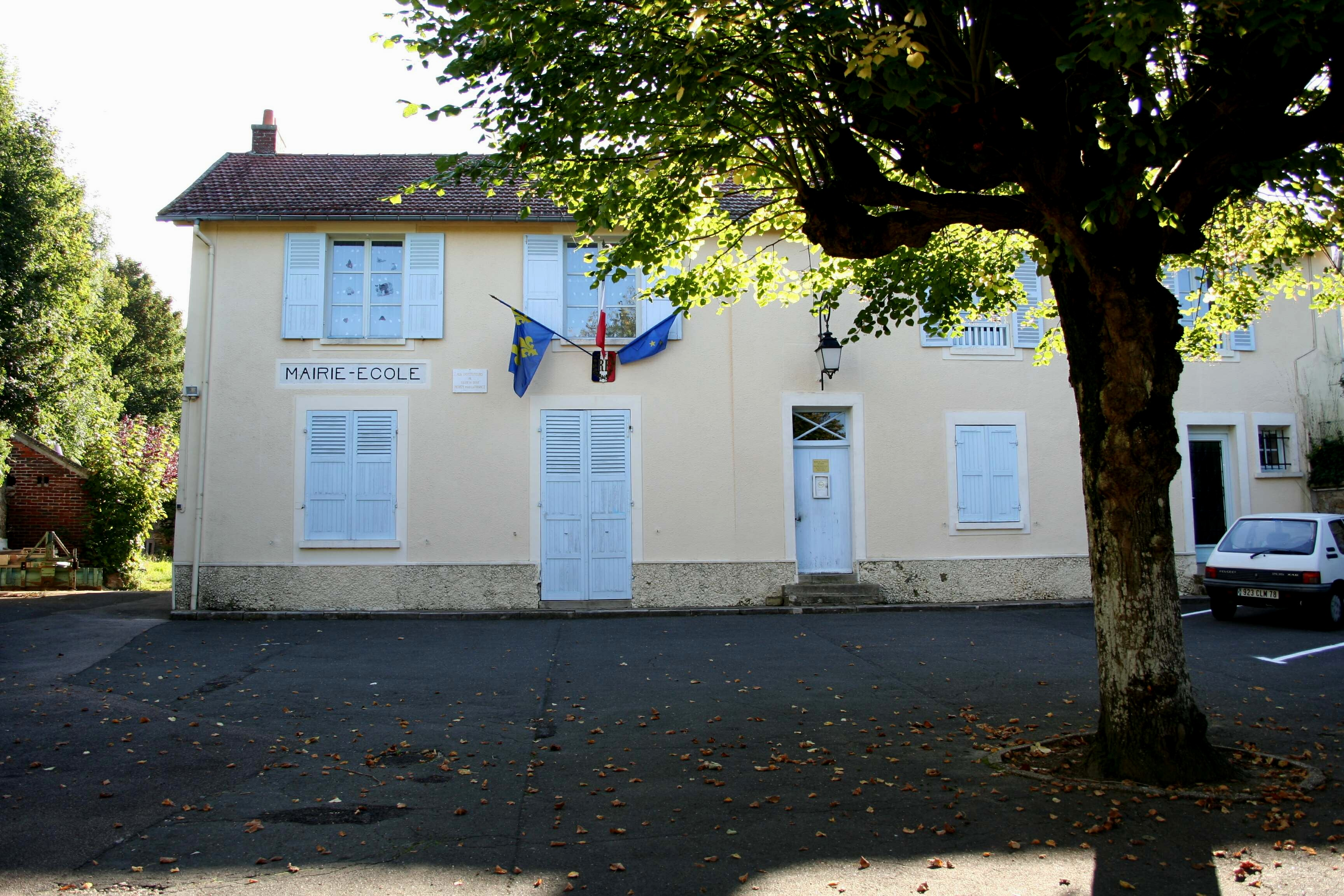
- Town hall
- Location of Lainville-en-Vexin
- Location within France Location within Île-de-France (region)
- Coordinates: 49°03′37″N 1°49′03″E
- Country: France
- Region: Île-de-France
- Department: Yvelines
- Arrondissement: Mantes-la-Jolie
- Canton: Limay
- Intercommunality: CU Grand Paris Seine et Oise

Government
  - Mayor (2020–2026): Martine Quignard
- Area^{1}: 7.67 km^{2} (2.96 sq mi)
- Elevation: 153 m (502 ft)
- Highest elevation: 201 m (659 ft)
- Lowest elevation: 93 m (305 ft)
- Population (2023): 805
  - Density: 105/km^{2} (272/sq mi)
- Time zone: UTC+01:00 (CET)
  - Summer (DST): UTC+02:00 (CEST)
- INSEE/Postal code: 78329 /78440
- ^{1} French Land Register data, which excludes lakes, ponds, glaciers > 1 km^{2} (0.386 sq mi or 247 acres) and river estuaries.

Lainville-en-Vexin (French pronunciation: [lɛ̃vil ɑ̃ vɛksɛ̃], literally Lainville in Vexin, before 1997: Lainville) is a commune in the Yvelines department in the Île-de-France region in north-central France.

== See also ==
- Communes of the Yvelines department
