= Route nationale 15 =

Road in France

National road 15
- Route nationale 15

Location
- Country: France

Highway system
- Roads in France; Autoroutes; Routes nationales

The N 15 was a trunk road (Route Nationale) in France.

== Route ==
The RN 15 links the A13 to Le Havre via Rouen and Yvetot.

The RN 15 originates at junction 14 on the A13 autoroute in the Yvelines département near Bonnières-sur-Seine. The road's first few kilometres are notoriously dangerous as the road is a continuous decline towards the river Seine from the A13 autoroute to the RN 13.

After crossing the RN 13, the RN 15 follows the Seine towards Vernon. The RN 15 straightens and leaves the river, passing the town of Gaillon. The road runs parallel to the A13 autoroute and passes through the Forêt de Louviers heading North and over the river at Pont-de-l'Arche onto the right bank of the Seine.

The road follows the river bank overlooked by surrounding cliffs including the Roches de Saint-Adrien. The road meets the Route nationale 14 and enters the capital of Normandy, Rouen.

The N15 heads Northwest from the city centre and towards Yvetot. It enters the town of Yvetot to continue westwards. The road passes near the town of Bolbec, passes the A29 autoroute, Harfleur and enters Le Havre, ending at the city town hall.

== History ==
The N 15 was numbered N 13^{BIS} from the 1950s until the end of the 1970s reclassification scheme. The RN 13^{BIS} replaced the RN 182 (between Bonnières-sur-Seine and Rouen) and the RN 14 (between Rouen and Le Havre).
Until 1972, the RN 15 was going from Pontoise to Dieppe; this road has been changed in RD 915 except in the Eure where it is called RD 15^{BIS}.
In 2006, the RN 15 has also been changed in a départementale and is now numbered RD 6015 in the Eure and Seine-Maritime départements and D 915 in the Yvelines. Nowadays, the RN 15 is limited to the crossing of Rouen.
