= Guitrancourt =

- Commune
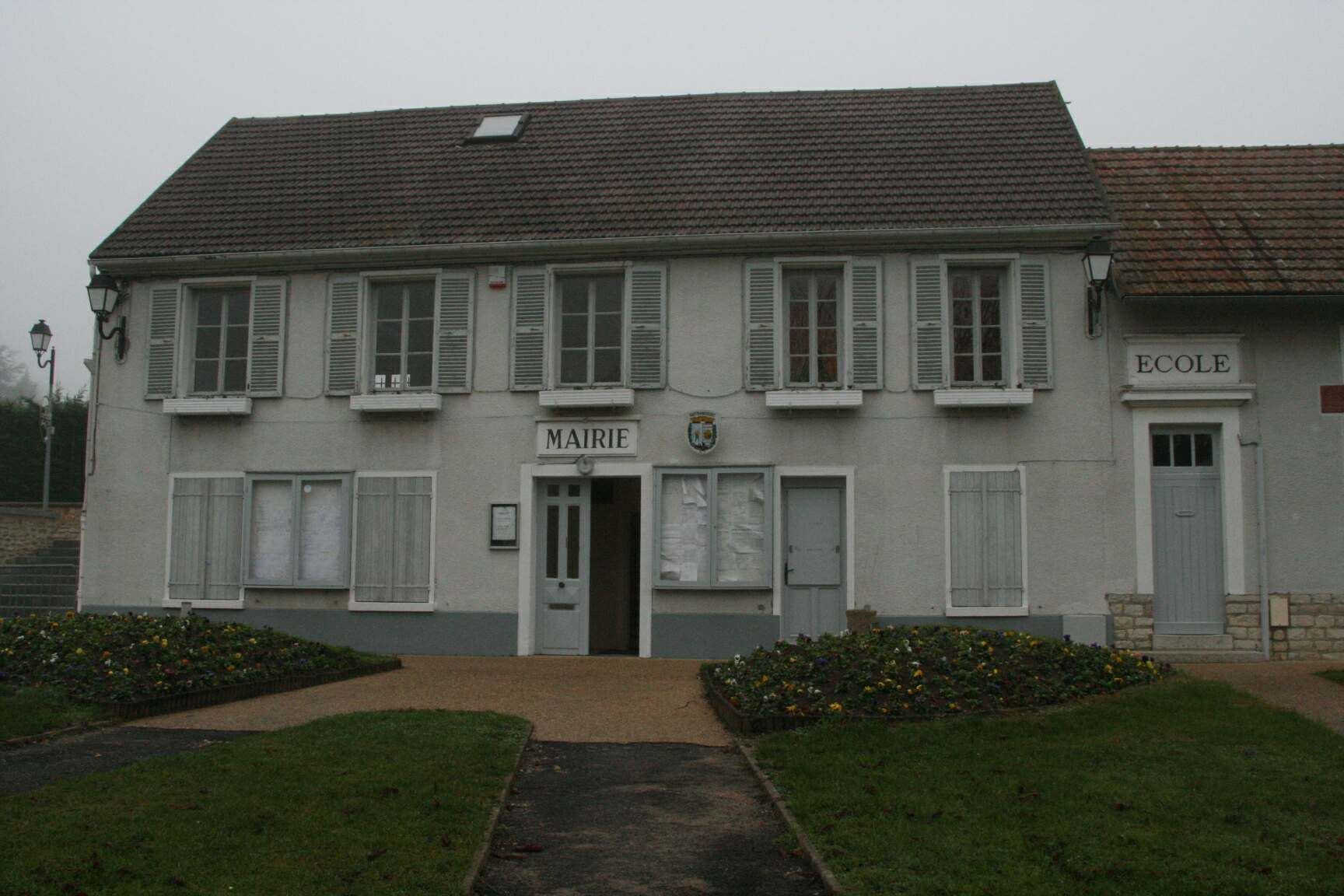
- Town hall

- Coat of arms
- Location of Guitrancourt
- Location within France Location within Île-de-France (region)
- Coordinates: 49°00′34″N 1°46′40″E
- Country: France
- Region: Île-de-France
- Department: Yvelines
- Arrondissement: Mantes-la-Jolie
- Canton: Limay
- Intercommunality: CU Grand Paris Seine et Oise

Government
  - Mayor (2020–2026): Patrick Daugé
- Area^{1}: 7.32 km^{2} (2.83 sq mi)
- Elevation: 161 m (528 ft)
- Highest elevation: 192 m (630 ft)
- Lowest elevation: 41 m (135 ft)
- Population (2023): 646
  - Density: 88.3/km^{2} (229/sq mi)
- Time zone: UTC+01:00 (CET)
  - Summer (DST): UTC+02:00 (CEST)
- INSEE/Postal code: 78296 /78440
- ^{1} French Land Register data, which excludes lakes, ponds, glaciers > 1 km^{2} (0.386 sq mi or 247 acres) and river estuaries.

Guitrancourt (French pronunciation: [ɡitʁɑ̃kuʁ]) is a commune in the Yvelines department in the Île-de-France region in north-central France.

Philosopher Jacques Lacan owned a local mansion called Prévôté. He lived there from 1955 until his death in 1981 and was buried at the municipal cemetery.

== See also ==
- Communes of the Yvelines department
