= Guernes =

- Commune
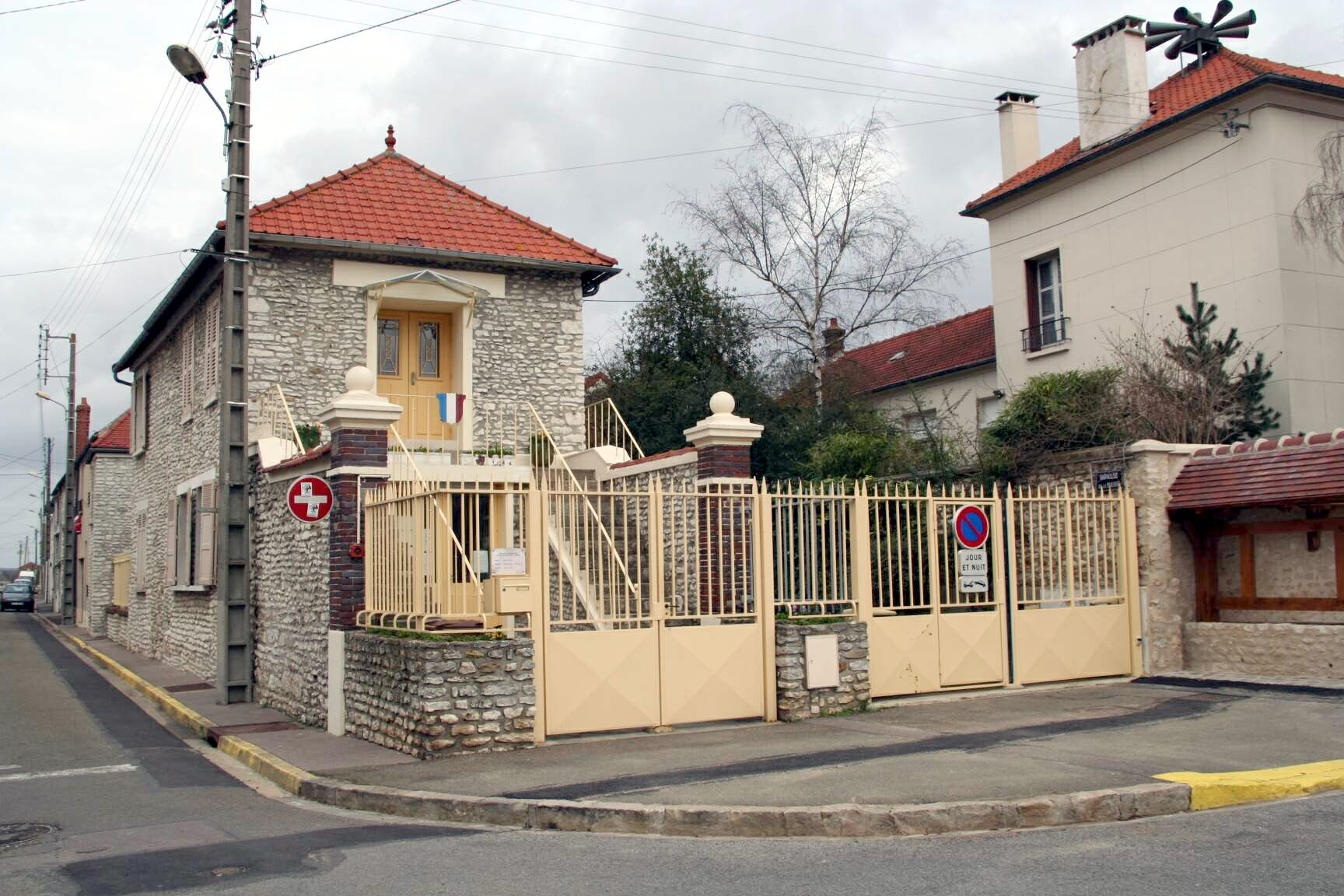
- Town hall

- Coat of arms
- Location of Guernes
- Location within France Location within Île-de-France (region)
- Coordinates: 49°00′42″N 1°38′12″E
- Country: France
- Region: Île-de-France
- Department: Yvelines
- Arrondissement: Mantes-la-Jolie
- Canton: Limay
- Intercommunality: CU Grand Paris Seine et Oise

Government
  - Mayor (2020–2026): Pascal Brusseaux
- Area^{1}: 8.54 km^{2} (3.30 sq mi)
- Elevation: 50 m (160 ft)
- Highest elevation: 71 m (233 ft)
- Lowest elevation: 15 m (49 ft)
- Population (2023): 1,085
  - Density: 127/km^{2} (329/sq mi)
- Time zone: UTC+01:00 (CET)
  - Summer (DST): UTC+02:00 (CEST)
- INSEE/Postal code: 78290 /78520
- ^{1} French Land Register data, which excludes lakes, ponds, glaciers > 1 km^{2} (0.386 sq mi or 247 acres) and river estuaries.

Guernes (French pronunciation: [ɡɛʁn]) is a commune in the Yvelines department in the Île-de-France region in north-central France.

== See also ==
- Communes of the Yvelines department
