= Limay, Yvelines =

Limay
- Commune
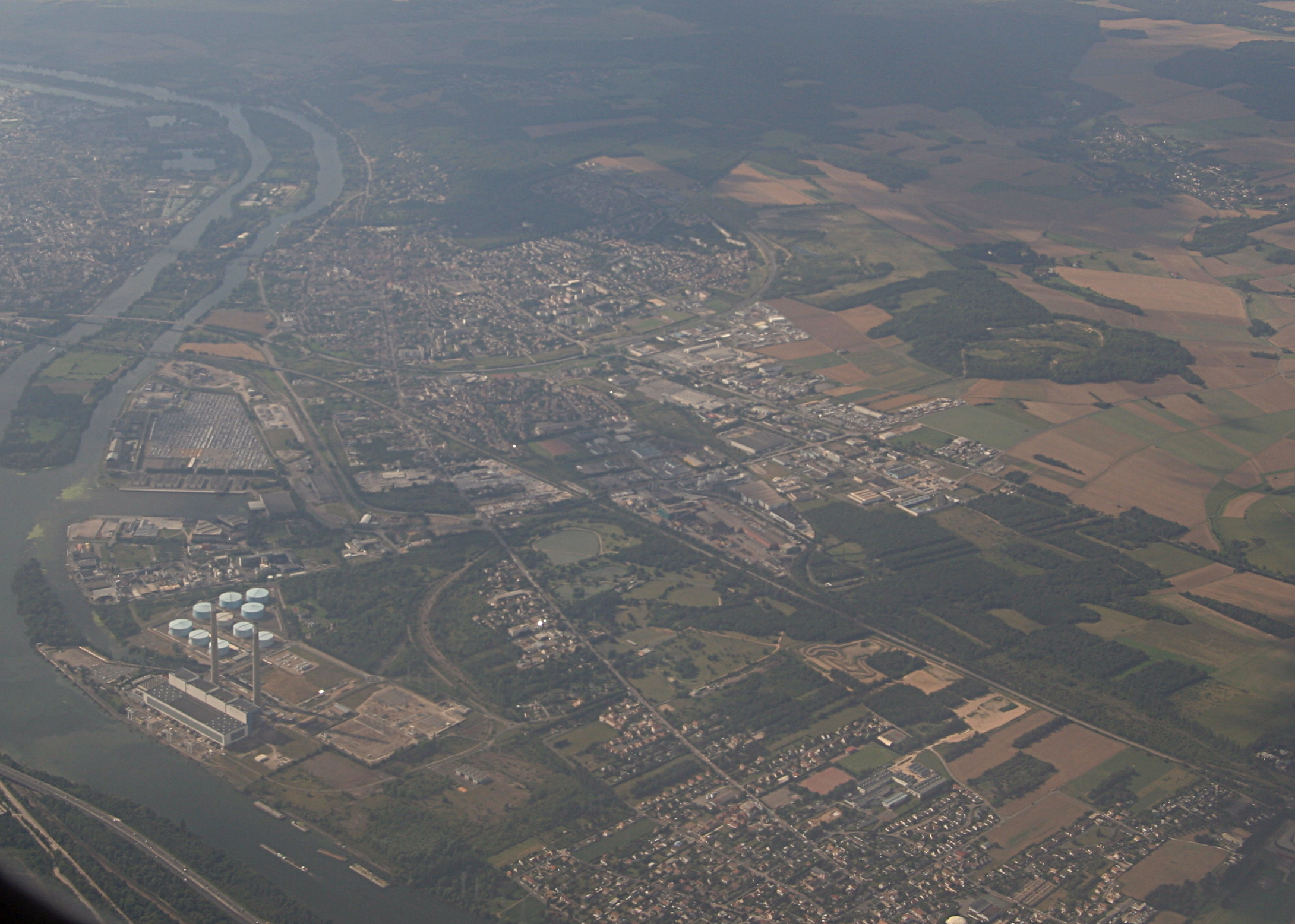
- Aerial view

- Coat of arms
- Location of Limay
- Location within France Location within Île-de-France (region)
- Coordinates: 48°59′39″N 1°44′12″E
- Country: France
- Region: Île-de-France
- Department: Yvelines
- Arrondissement: Mantes-la-Jolie
- Canton: Limay
- Intercommunality: CU Grand Paris Seine et Oise

Government
  - Mayor (2026–2032): Djamel Nedjar
- Area^{1}: 11.48 km^{2} (4.43 sq mi)
- Elevation: 28 m (92 ft)
- Highest elevation: 137 m (449 ft)
- Lowest elevation: 17 m (56 ft)
- Population (2023): 17,885
  - Density: 1,558/km^{2} (4,035/sq mi)
- Time zone: UTC+01:00 (CET)
  - Summer (DST): UTC+02:00 (CEST)
- INSEE/Postal code: 78335 /78520
- ^{1} French Land Register data, which excludes lakes, ponds, glaciers > 1 km^{2} (0.386 sq mi or 247 acres) and river estuaries.

Limay (French pronunciation: [limɛ]) is a commune in the Yvelines department in the Île-de-France region in north-central France. It is located in the western suburbs of Paris 47.8 km (29.7 mi) from the center.

Limay lies across the Seine river from Mantes-la-Jolie.

== Population ==
Historical population
Year	Pop.	±% p.a.
1968	6,615	—
1975	9,024	+4.54%
1982	10,129	+1.66%
1990	12,660	+2.83%
1999	15,709	+2.43%
2007	15,873	+0.13%
2012	16,128	+0.32%
2017	16,820	+0.84%
2023	17,885	+1.03%
Source: INSEE

== People ==
Composer Ernest Chausson owned an estate in Limay, and it was here that he died in a bicycle accident on his property.

== Transportation ==
Limay is served by Limay station on the Transilien Paris-Saint-Lazare suburban rail line.

== See also ==
- Communes of the Yvelines department
