= Sailly, Yvelines =

Sailly
- Commune
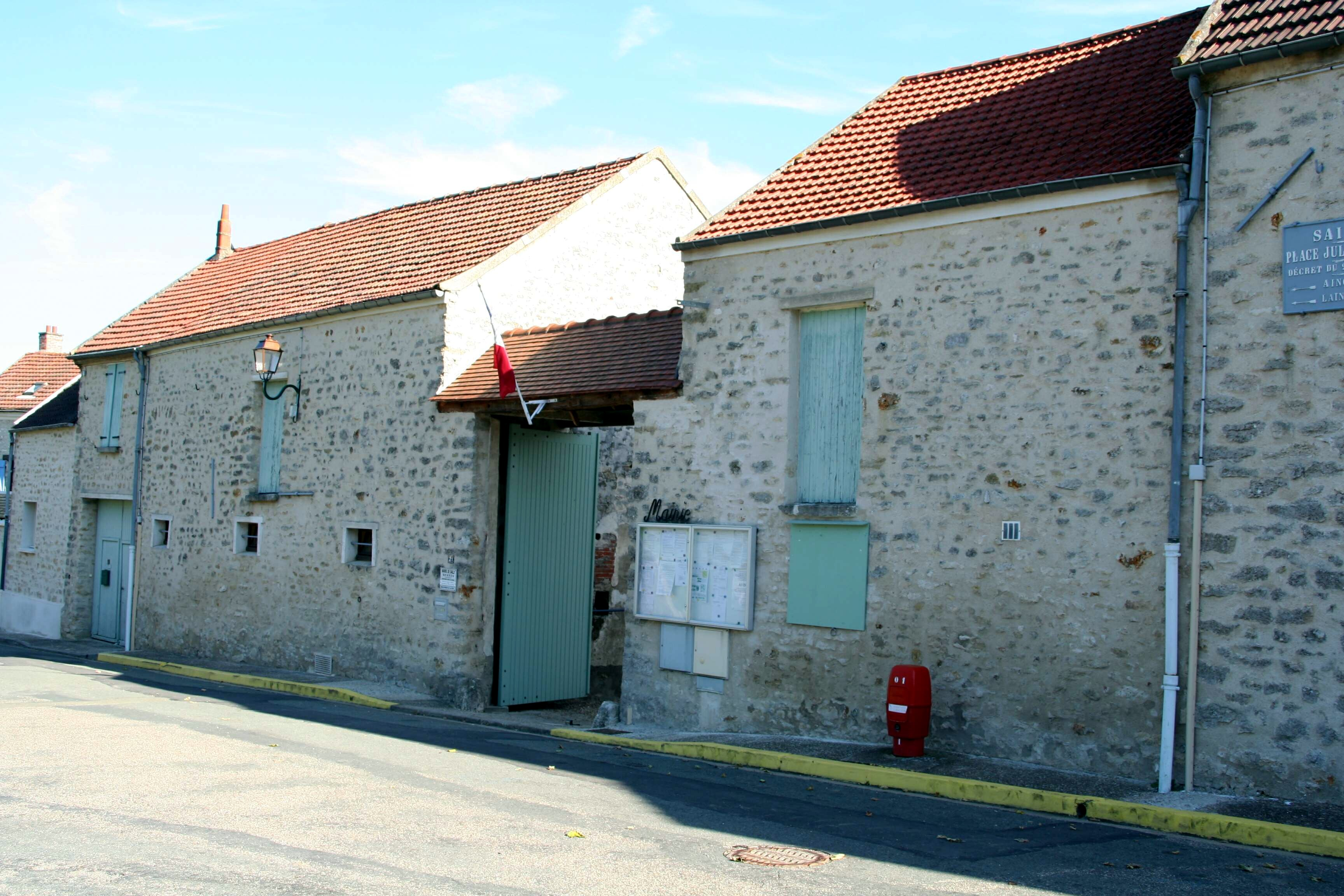
- Town hall
- Location of Sailly
- Location within France Location within Île-de-France (region)
- Coordinates: 49°02′27″N 1°48′03″E
- Country: France
- Region: Île-de-France
- Department: Yvelines
- Arrondissement: Mantes-la-Jolie
- Canton: Limay
- Intercommunality: CU Grand Paris Seine et Oise

Government
  - Mayor (2020–2026): Gérard Béguin
- Area^{1}: 5.45 km^{2} (2.10 sq mi)
- Elevation: 120 m (390 ft)
- Highest elevation: 174 m (571 ft)
- Lowest elevation: 81 m (266 ft)
- Population (2023): 354
  - Density: 65.0/km^{2} (168/sq mi)
- Time zone: UTC+01:00 (CET)
  - Summer (DST): UTC+02:00 (CEST)
- INSEE/Postal code: 78536 /78440
- ^{1} French Land Register data, which excludes lakes, ponds, glaciers > 1 km^{2} (0.386 sq mi or 247 acres) and river estuaries.

Sailly (French pronunciation: [saji]) is a commune in the Yvelines department in the Île-de-France region in north-central France.

== See also ==
- Communes of the Yvelines department
