= La Falaise =

- Commune
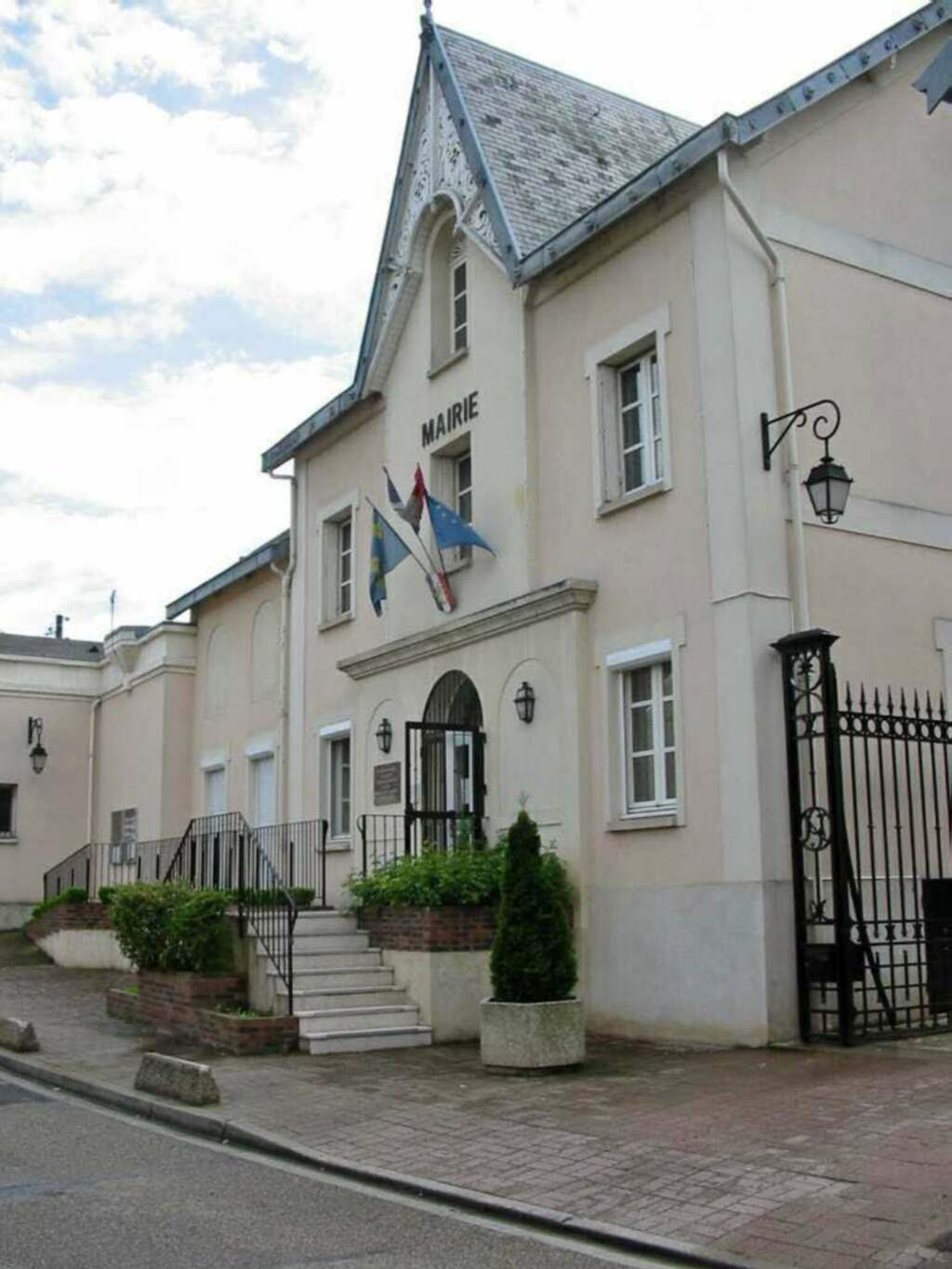
- The town hall in La Falaise

- Coat of arms
- Location of La Falaise
- Location within France Location within Île-de-France (region)
- Coordinates: 48°56′42″N 1°49′55″E
- Country: France
- Region: Île-de-France
- Department: Yvelines
- Arrondissement: Mantes-la-Jolie
- Canton: Limay
- Intercommunality: CU Grand Paris Seine et Oise

Government
  - Mayor (2020–2026): leo
- Area^{1}: 3.00 km^{2} (1.16 sq mi)
- Elevation: 29 m (95 ft)
- Highest elevation: 134 m (440 ft)
- Lowest elevation: 17 m (56 ft)
- Population (2023): 609
  - Density: 203/km^{2} (526/sq mi)
- Time zone: UTC+01:00 (CET)
  - Summer (DST): UTC+02:00 (CEST)
- INSEE/Postal code: 78230 /78410
- ^{1} French Land Register data, which excludes lakes, ponds, glaciers > 1 km^{2} (0.386 sq mi or 247 acres) and river estuaries.

La Falaise (French pronunciation: [la falɛz]) is a commune in the Yvelines department in the Île-de-France region in north-central France.

== See also ==
- Communes of the Yvelines department
