= Flavacourt =

- Commune
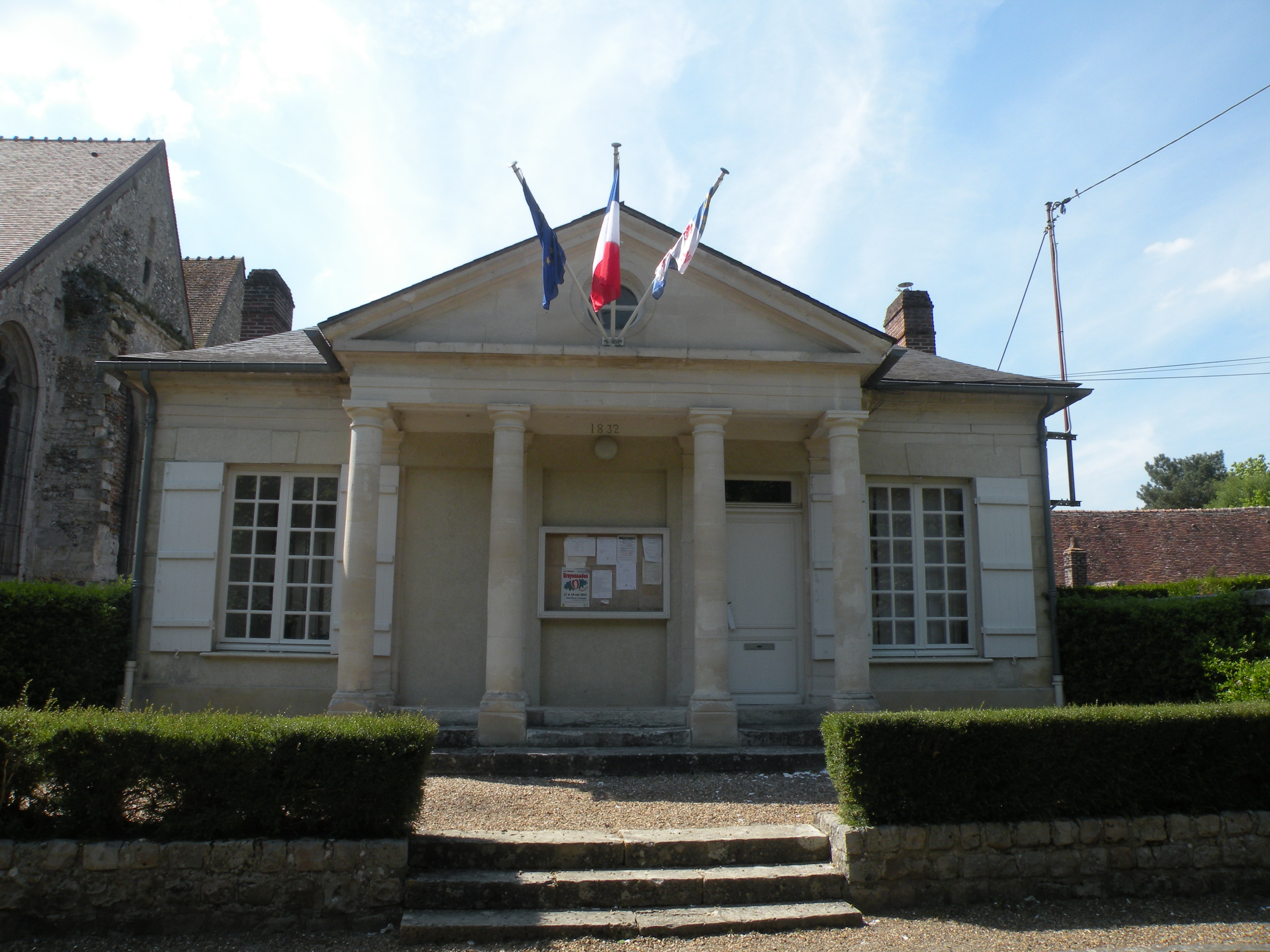
- The town hall in Flavacourt
- Location of Flavacourt
- Location within France Location within Hauts-de-France
- Coordinates: 49°20′09″N 1°49′18″E
- Country: France
- Region: Hauts-de-France
- Department: Oise
- Arrondissement: Beauvais
- Canton: Beauvais-2
- Intercommunality: Pays de Bray

Government
  - Mayor (2020–2026): Xavier Hue
- Area^{1}: 18.51 km^{2} (7.15 sq mi)
- Elevation: 95 m (312 ft)
- Highest elevation: 187 m (614 ft)
- Lowest elevation: 82 m (269 ft)
- Population (2023): 684
  - Density: 37.0/km^{2} (95.7/sq mi)
- Time zone: UTC+01:00 (CET)
  - Summer (DST): UTC+02:00 (CEST)
- INSEE/Postal code: 60235 /60590
- ^{1} French Land Register data, which excludes lakes, ponds, glaciers > 1 km^{2} (0.386 sq mi or 247 acres) and river estuaries.

Flavacourt (French pronunciation: [flavakuʁ]) is a commune in the Oise department in northern France.

== See also ==
- Communes of the Oise department
