= Fontenay-Saint-Père =

- Commune
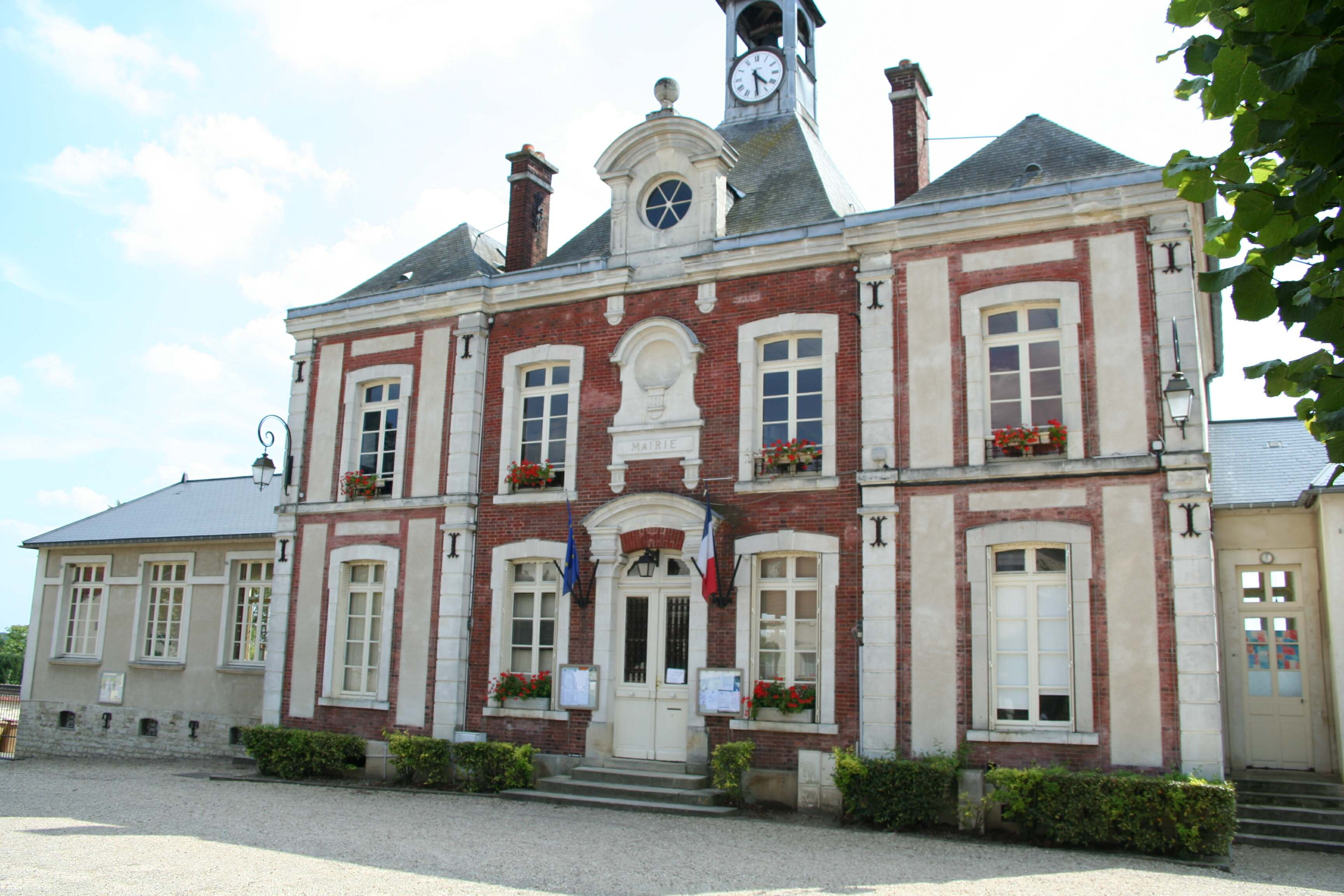
- Town hall

- Coat of arms
- Location of Fontenay-Saint-Père
- Location within France Location within Île-de-France (region)
- Coordinates: 49°01′40″N 1°45′10″E
- Country: France
- Region: Île-de-France
- Department: Yvelines
- Arrondissement: Mantes-la-Jolie
- Canton: Limay
- Intercommunality: CU Grand Paris Seine et Oise

Government
  - Mayor (2020–2026): Thierry Jorel
- Area^{1}: 13.06 km^{2} (5.04 sq mi)
- Elevation: 93 m (305 ft)
- Highest elevation: 196 m (643 ft)
- Lowest elevation: 67 m (220 ft)
- Population (2023): 949
  - Density: 72.7/km^{2} (188/sq mi)
- Time zone: UTC+01:00 (CET)
  - Summer (DST): UTC+02:00 (CEST)
- INSEE/Postal code: 78246 /78440
- ^{1} French Land Register data, which excludes lakes, ponds, glaciers > 1 km^{2} (0.386 sq mi or 247 acres) and river estuaries.

Fontenay-Saint-Père (French pronunciation: [fɔ̃tnɛ sɛ̃ pɛʁ]) is a commune in the Yvelines department in the Île-de-France in north-central France.

== See also ==
- Communes of the Yvelines department
