= Chaussée Jules César =

Roman road in France

Chaussée Jules César was a Roman road linking Lutetia (Paris) and Rotamagus (Rouen). The road's construction was initiated by the Roman governor Marcus Vipsanius Agrippa. Linking two important cities of Roman Empire in Gaul, the road possessed inns and postal relays every 15 km, thereby enabling mail to travel between Paris and Rouen within a day.

Most of its course is used by French Route nationale 14.

Reconstruction work was led in 2000 as to provide a GR footpath path. Parts of road was rehabilitated between Pontoise (Briva Isara) and Magny-en-Vexin.
