= Canton of Limay =

Coordinates: 48.99°N 1.74°E

The canton of Limay is an administrative division of the Yvelines department, northern France. Its borders were modified at the French canton reorganisation which came into effect in March 2015. Its seat is in Limay.

It consists of the following communes:

1. Brueil-en-Vexin
2. Drocourt
3. Épône
4. La Falaise
5. Follainville-Dennemont
6. Fontenay-Saint-Père
7. Gargenville
8. Guernes
9. Guitrancourt
10. Issou
11. Jambville
12. Juziers
13. Lainville-en-Vexin
14. Limay
15. Mézières-sur-Seine
16. Montalet-le-Bois
17. Oinville-sur-Montcient
18. Porcheville
19. Sailly
20. Saint-Martin-la-Garenne
