= Porcheville =

- Commune
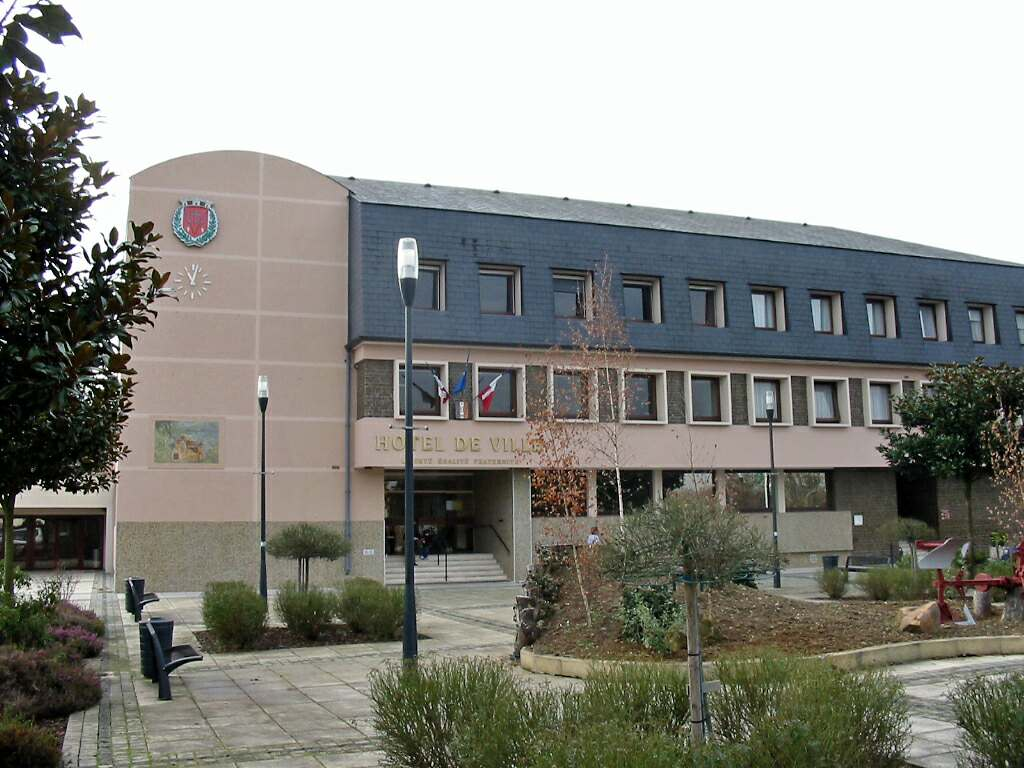
- Town hall

- Coat of arms
- Location of Porcheville
- Location within France Location within Île-de-France (region)
- Coordinates: 48°58′20″N 1°46′44″E
- Country: France
- Region: Île-de-France
- Department: Yvelines
- Arrondissement: Mantes-la-Jolie
- Canton: Limay
- Intercommunality: CU Grand Paris Seine et Oise

Government
  - Mayor (2026–2032): Alec Jaltier
- Area^{1}: 4.62 km^{2} (1.78 sq mi)
- Elevation: 20 m (66 ft)
- Highest elevation: 61 m (200 ft)
- Lowest elevation: 17 m (56 ft)
- Population (2023): 3,382
  - Density: 732/km^{2} (1,900/sq mi)
- Time zone: UTC+01:00 (CET)
  - Summer (DST): UTC+02:00 (CEST)
- INSEE/Postal code: 78501 /78440
- ^{1} French Land Register data, which excludes lakes, ponds, glaciers > 1 km^{2} (0.386 sq mi or 247 acres) and river estuaries.

Porcheville (French: [pɔʁʃəvil]) is a commune in the Yvelines department in the Île-de-France region in north-central France.

== Population ==
Historical population
Year	Pop.	±% p.a.
1968	1,779	—
1975	2,456	+4.71%
1982	2,740	+1.58%
1990	2,596	−0.67%
1999	2,502	−0.41%
2007	2,546	+0.22%
2012	3,094	+3.98%
2017	3,203	+0.69%
2023	3,382	+0.91%
Source: INSEE

== See also ==
- Communes of the Yvelines department
