= Follainville-Dennemont =

- Commune
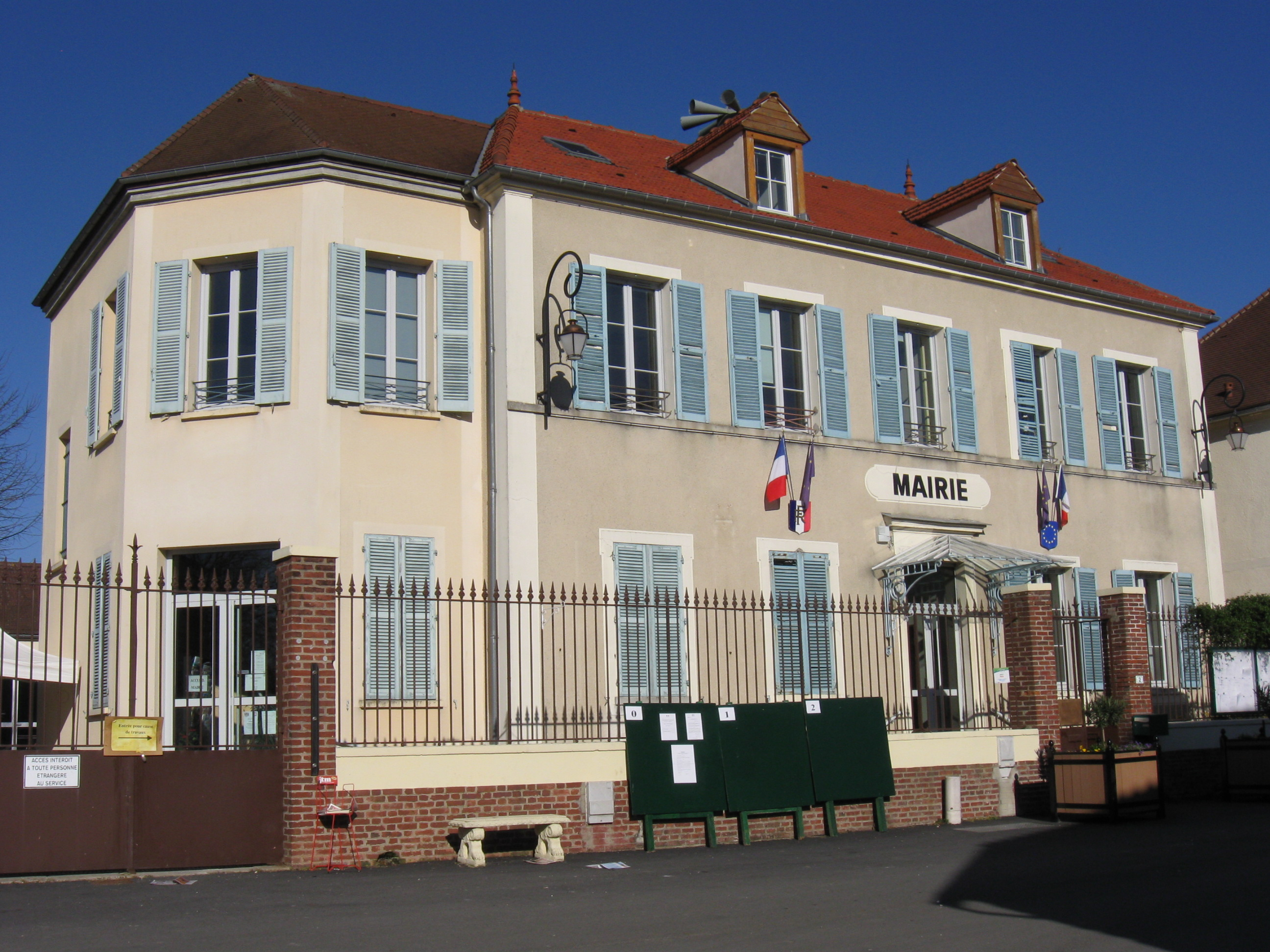
- Location of Follainville-Dennemont
- Location within France Location within Île-de-France (region)
- Coordinates: 49°01′17″N 1°42′53″E
- Country: France
- Region: Île-de-France
- Department: Yvelines
- Arrondissement: Mantes-la-Jolie
- Canton: Limay
- Intercommunality: CU Grand Paris Seine et Oise

Government
  - Mayor (2020–2026): Sébastien Lavancier
- Area^{1}: 9.69 km^{2} (3.74 sq mi)
- Elevation: 85 m (279 ft)
- Highest elevation: 149 m (489 ft)
- Lowest elevation: 16 m (52 ft)
- Population (2023): 2,184
  - Density: 225/km^{2} (584/sq mi)
- Time zone: UTC+01:00 (CET)
  - Summer (DST): UTC+02:00 (CEST)
- INSEE/Postal code: 78239 /78520
- ^{1} French Land Register data, which excludes lakes, ponds, glaciers > 1 km^{2} (0.386 sq mi or 247 acres) and river estuaries.

Follainville-Dennemont (French pronunciation: [fɔlɛ̃vil dɛnmɔ̃]) is a commune in the Yvelines department in the Île-de-France in north-central France.

== Population ==
Historical population
Year	Pop.	±% p.a.
1968	1,056	—
1975	1,383	+3.93%
1982	1,507	+1.23%
1990	1,775	+2.07%
1999	1,912	+0.83%
2007	1,871	−0.27%
2012	1,857	−0.15%
2017	2,139	+2.87%
2023	2,184	+0.35%
Source: INSEE

== See also ==
- Communes of the Yvelines department
