= Issou =

- Commune
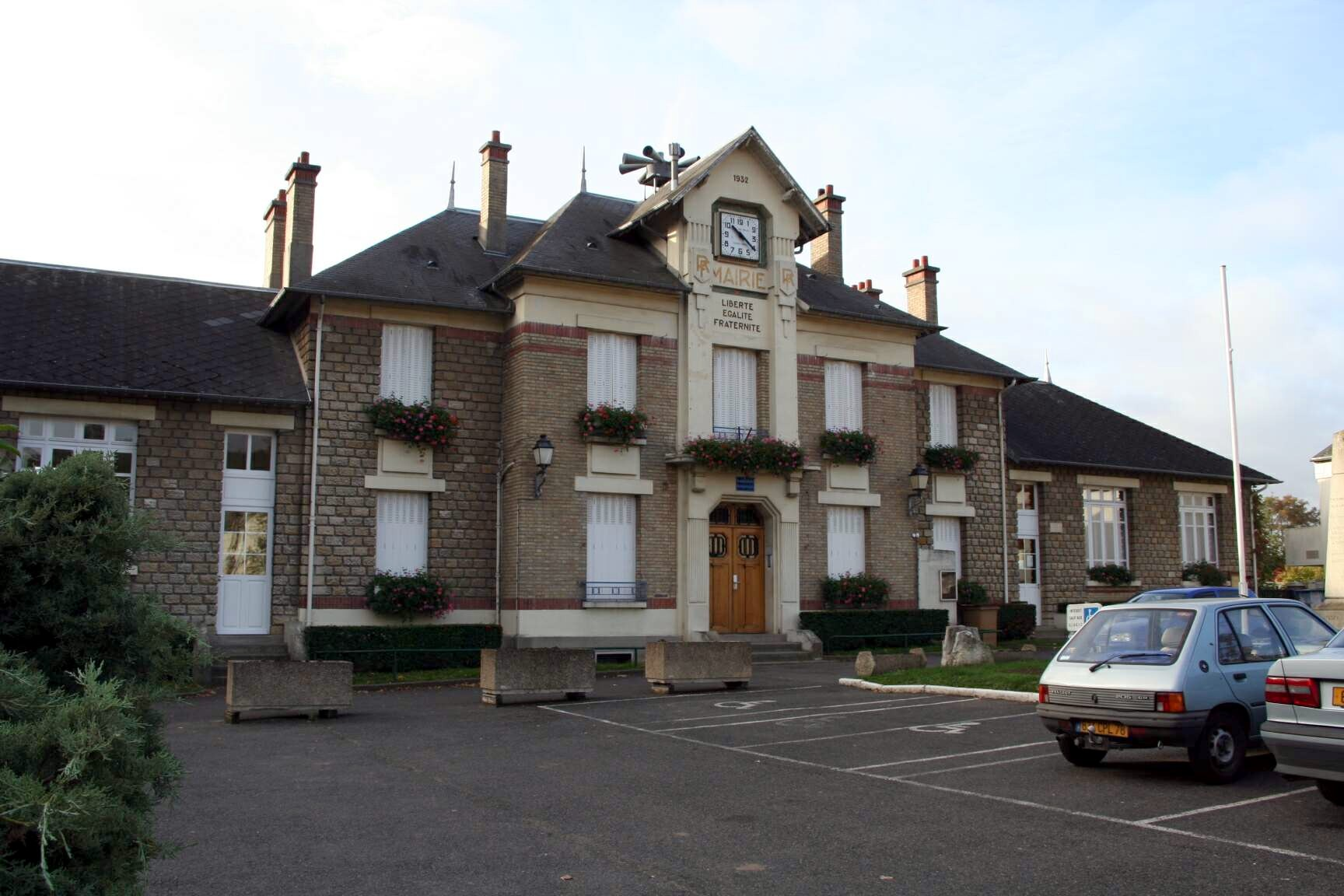
- Town hall

- Coat of arms
- Location of Issou
- Location within France Location within Île-de-France (region)
- Coordinates: 48°59′24″N 1°47′37″E
- Country: France
- Region: Île-de-France
- Department: Yvelines
- Arrondissement: Mantes-la-Jolie
- Canton: Limay
- Intercommunality: CU Grand Paris Seine et Oise

Government
  - Mayor (2020–2026): Lionel Giraud
- Area^{1}: 4.8 km^{2} (1.9 sq mi)
- Elevation: 72 m (236 ft)
- Highest elevation: 127 m (417 ft)
- Lowest elevation: 17 m (56 ft)
- Population (2023): 4,060
  - Density: 850/km^{2} (2,200/sq mi)
- Time zone: UTC+01:00 (CET)
  - Summer (DST): UTC+02:00 (CEST)
- INSEE/Postal code: 78314 /78440
- ^{1} French Land Register data, which excludes lakes, ponds, glaciers > 1 km^{2} (0.386 sq mi or 247 acres) and river estuaries.

Issou (French pronunciation: [isu]) is a commune in the Yvelines department, administrative region of Île-de-France, France.

== Population ==
Historical population
Year	Pop.	±% p.a.
1968	1,070	—
1975	1,190	+1.53%
1982	1,697	+5.20%
1990	2,463	+4.77%
1999	3,382	+3.59%
2007	4,470	+3.55%
2012	4,455	−0.07%
2017	4,100	−1.65%
2023	4,060	−0.16%
Source: INSEE

== See also ==
- Communes of the Yvelines department
