= Bonnières-sur-Seine =

- Commune
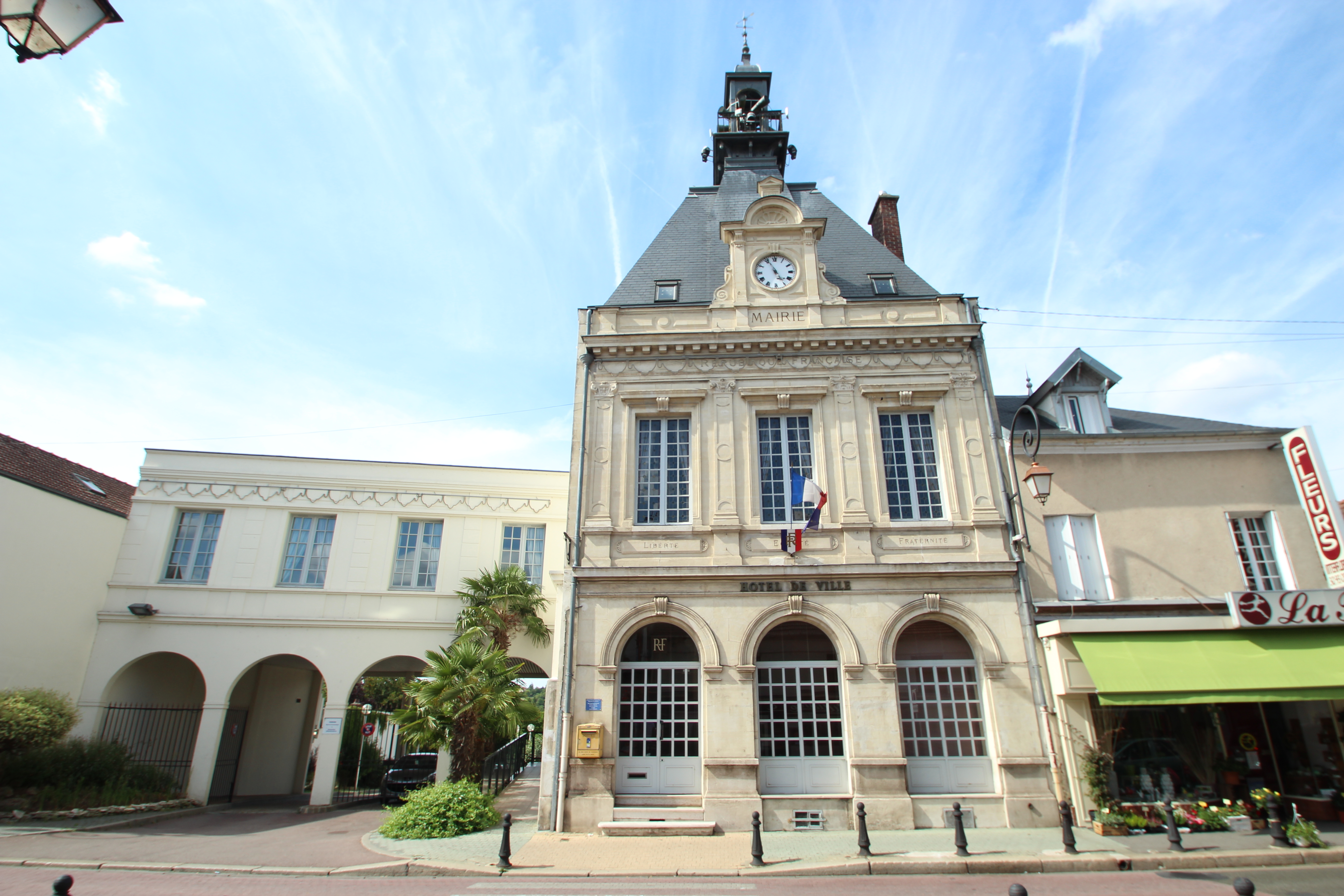
- Town hall

- Coat of arms
- Location of Bonnières-sur-Seine
- Location within France Location within Île-de-France (region)
- Coordinates: 49°02′10″N 1°34′48″E
- Country: France
- Region: Île-de-France
- Department: Yvelines
- Arrondissement: Mantes-la-Jolie
- Canton: Bonnières-sur-Seine
- Intercommunality: CC des Portes de l'Île-de-France

Government
  - Mayor (2020–2026): Jean-Marc Pommier
- Area^{1}: 7.66 km^{2} (2.96 sq mi)
- Elevation: 63 m (207 ft)
- Highest elevation: 131 m (430 ft)
- Lowest elevation: 13 m (43 ft)
- Population (2023): 5,064
  - Density: 661/km^{2} (1,710/sq mi)
- Demonym: Bonniérois
- Time zone: UTC+01:00 (CET)
  - Summer (DST): UTC+02:00 (CEST)
- INSEE/Postal code: 78089 /78270
- Website: www.bonnieres-sur-seine.fr
- ^{1} French Land Register data, which excludes lakes, ponds, glaciers > 1 km^{2} (0.386 sq mi or 247 acres) and river estuaries.

Bonnières-sur-Seine (French pronunciation: [bɔnjɛʁ syʁ sɛn], lit. 'Bonnières-on-Seine') is a commune in the Yvelines department in Île-de-France in northern France.

== Transport ==
Bonnières-sur-Seine is served by Bonnières station on the Paris–Le Havre railway.

== Population ==
Historical population
Year	Pop.	±% p.a.
1968	2,846	—
1975	3,399	+2.57%
1982	3,253	−0.63%
1990	3,437	+0.69%
1999	3,993	+1.68%
2007	4,028	+0.11%
2012	4,552	+2.48%
2017	4,612	+0.26%
2023	5,064	+1.57%
Source: INSEE

== Gallery ==
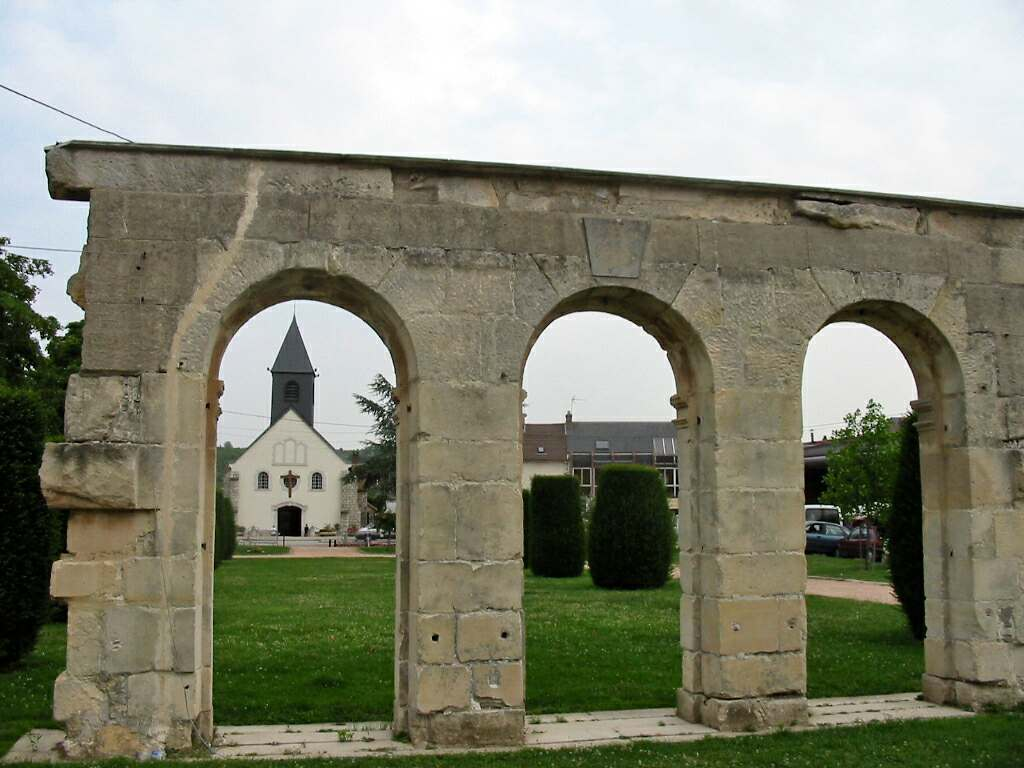
The arches in front of the church

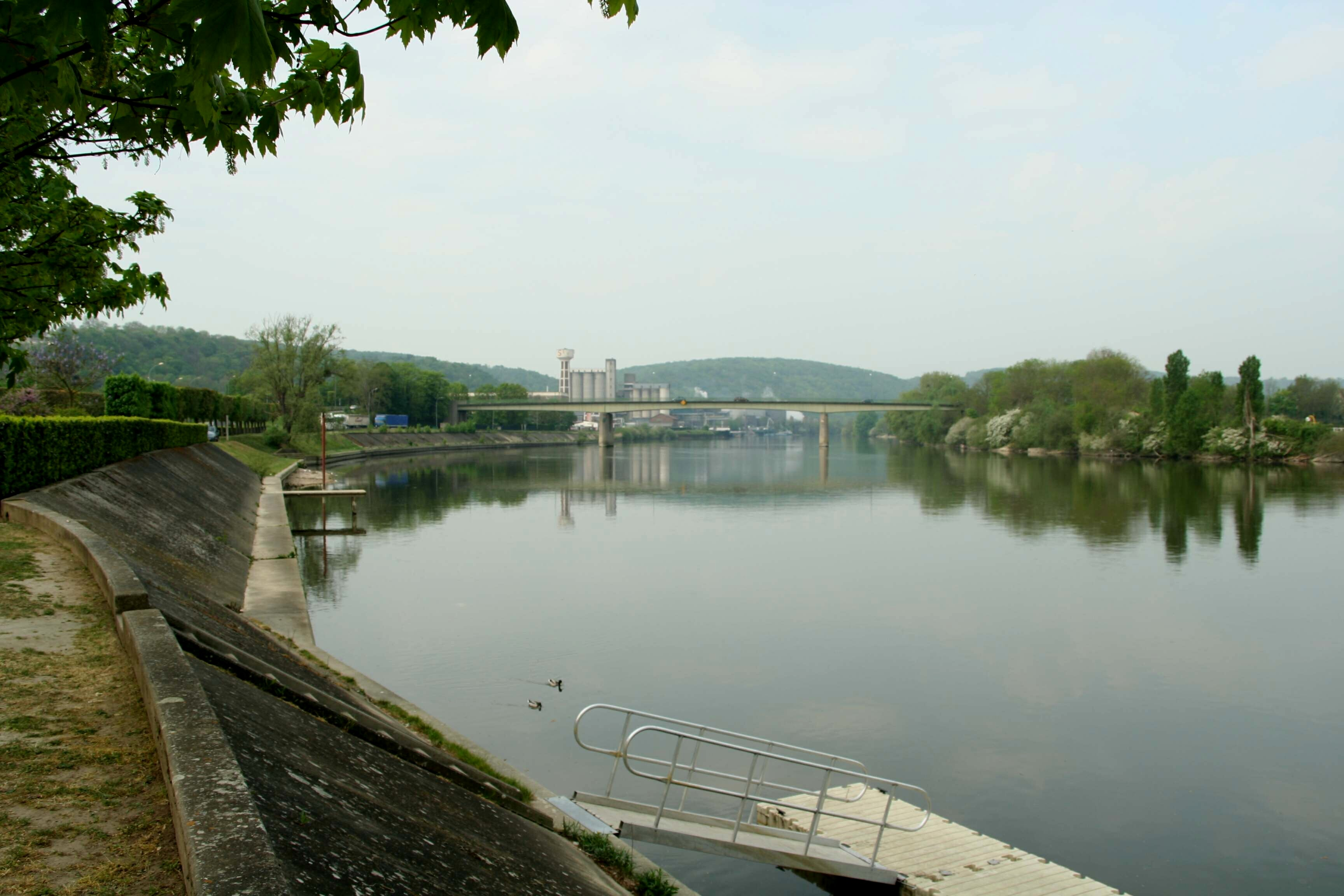
The Seine River and the bridge

== See also ==
- Communes of the Yvelines department
