= Juziers =

- Commune
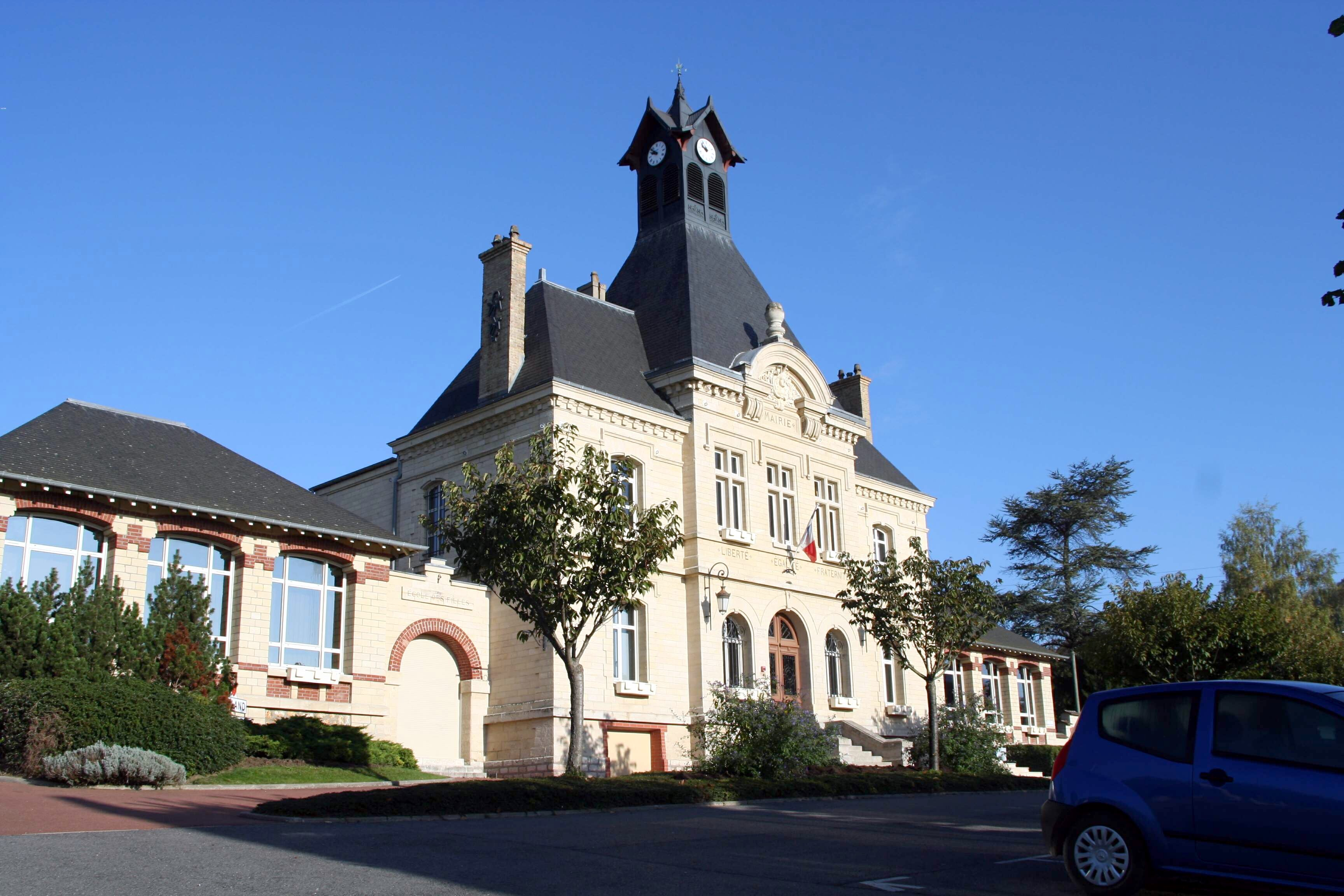
- Town hall

- Coat of arms
- Location of Juziers
- Location within France Location within Île-de-France (region)
- Coordinates: 48°59′36″N 1°50′47″E
- Country: France
- Region: Île-de-France
- Department: Yvelines
- Arrondissement: Mantes-la-Jolie
- Canton: Limay
- Intercommunality: Grand Paris Seine et Oise

Government
  - Mayor (2026–2032): Cédric Guillaume
- Area^{1}: 9.88 km^{2} (3.81 sq mi)
- Elevation: 61 m (200 ft)
- Highest elevation: 185 m (607 ft)
- Lowest elevation: 17 m (56 ft)
- Population (2023): 4,065
  - Density: 411/km^{2} (1,070/sq mi)
- Time zone: UTC+01:00 (CET)
  - Summer (DST): UTC+02:00 (CEST)
- INSEE/Postal code: 78327 /78820
- ^{1} French Land Register data, which excludes lakes, ponds, glaciers > 1 km^{2} (0.386 sq mi or 247 acres) and river estuaries.

Juziers (French pronunciation: [ʒyzje]) is a commune in the Yvelines department in the Île-de-France region in north-central France.

== Population ==
Historical population
Year	Pop.	±% p.a.
1968	1,895	—
1975	2,348	+3.11%
1982	2,558	+1.23%
1990	3,164	+2.69%
1999	3,370	+0.70%
2007	3,668	+1.06%
2012	3,817	+0.80%
2017	3,820	+0.02%
2023	4,065	+1.04%
Source: INSEE

== Twinnings ==
- East Hoathly with Halland, England since 1995.

== See also ==
- Communes of the Yvelines department
