= Fleury-sur-Andelle =

- Commune
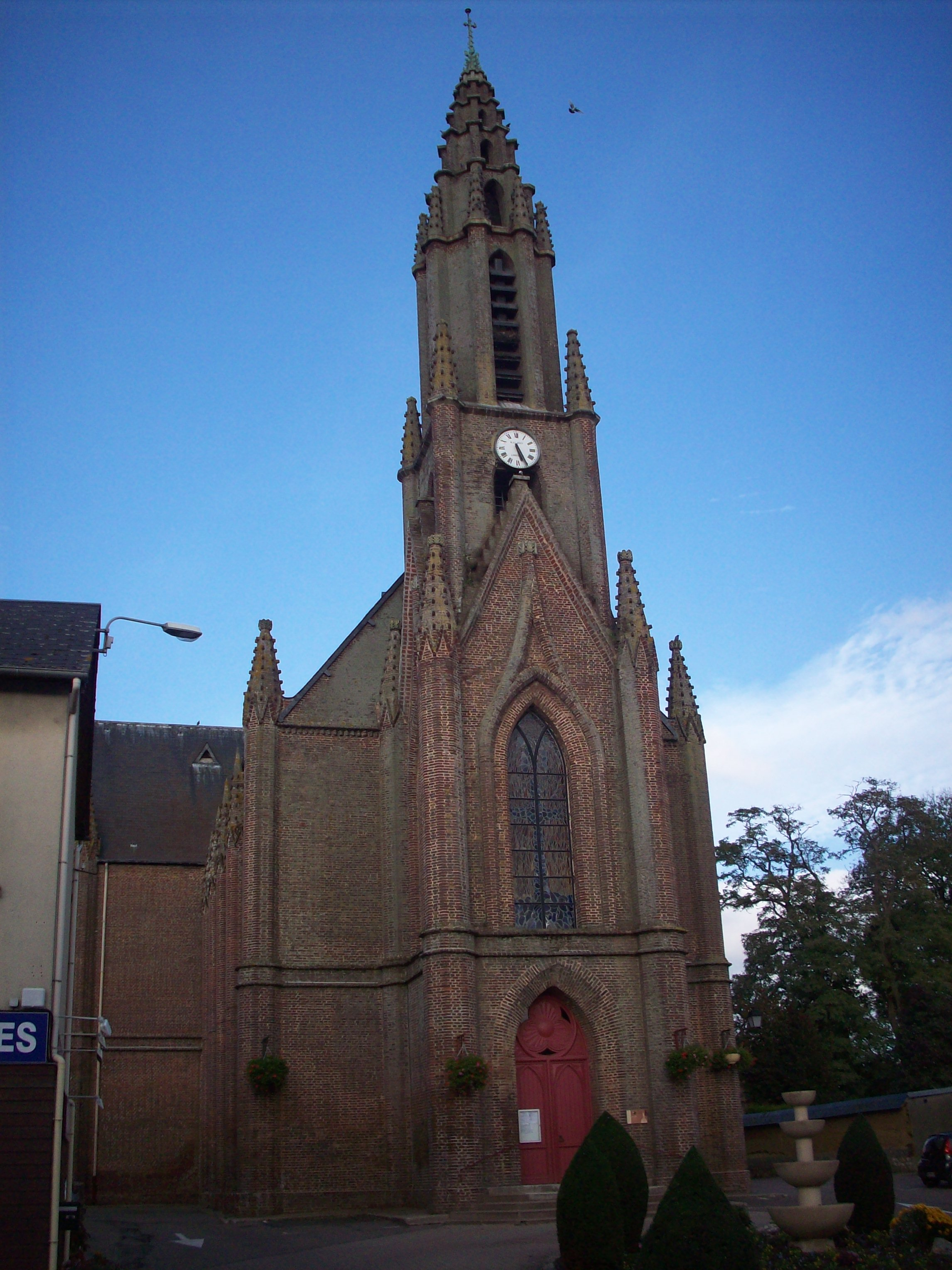
- The church in Fleury-sur-Andelle

- Coat of arms
- Location of Fleury-sur-Andelle
- Location within France Location within Normandy
- Coordinates: 49°21′46″N 1°21′22″E
- Country: France
- Region: Normandy
- Department: Eure
- Arrondissement: Les Andelys
- Canton: Romilly-sur-Andelle

Government
  - Mayor (2020–2026): Rémi Vieillard
- Area^{1}: 3.79 km^{2} (1.46 sq mi)
- Elevation: 30 m (98 ft)
- Highest elevation: 125 m (410 ft)
- Lowest elevation: 25 m (82 ft)
- Population (2023): 1,801
  - Density: 475/km^{2} (1,230/sq mi)
- Time zone: UTC+01:00 (CET)
  - Summer (DST): UTC+02:00 (CEST)
- INSEE/Postal code: 27246 /27380
- ^{1} French Land Register data, which excludes lakes, ponds, glaciers > 1 km^{2} (0.386 sq mi or 247 acres) and river estuaries.

Fleury-sur-Andelle (French pronunciation: [flœʁi syʁ ɑ̃dɛl]; Norman: Flleury-sus-Aundelle) is a commune in the Eure department, in the region of Normandy, northern France.

== Population ==
Historical population
Year	Pop.	±% p.a.
1968	1,604	—
1975	1,817	+1.80%
1982	2,039	+1.66%
1990	2,015	−0.15%
1999	1,901	−0.65%
2007	1,881	−0.13%
2012	1,894	+0.14%
2017	1,844	−0.53%
2023	1,801	−0.39%
Source: INSEE

== International relations ==
It is twinned with East Goscote, Leicestershire.

== See also ==
- Communes of the Eure department
