= A115 autoroute =

Road in France

A115 autoroute

Route information
- Length: 11.7 km (7.3 mi)
- Existed: 1976–present

Major junctions
- South end: A 15 in Sannois

- North end: N 184 in Méry-sur-Oise

Location
- Country: France

Highway system
- Roads in France; Autoroutes; Routes nationales

The A115 autoroute is a motorway in Île-de-France in France. It is a 10.7 km (6.6 mi) long spur of the A15 autoroute, linking it to the RN 184 near Méry-sur-Oise.

== History ==
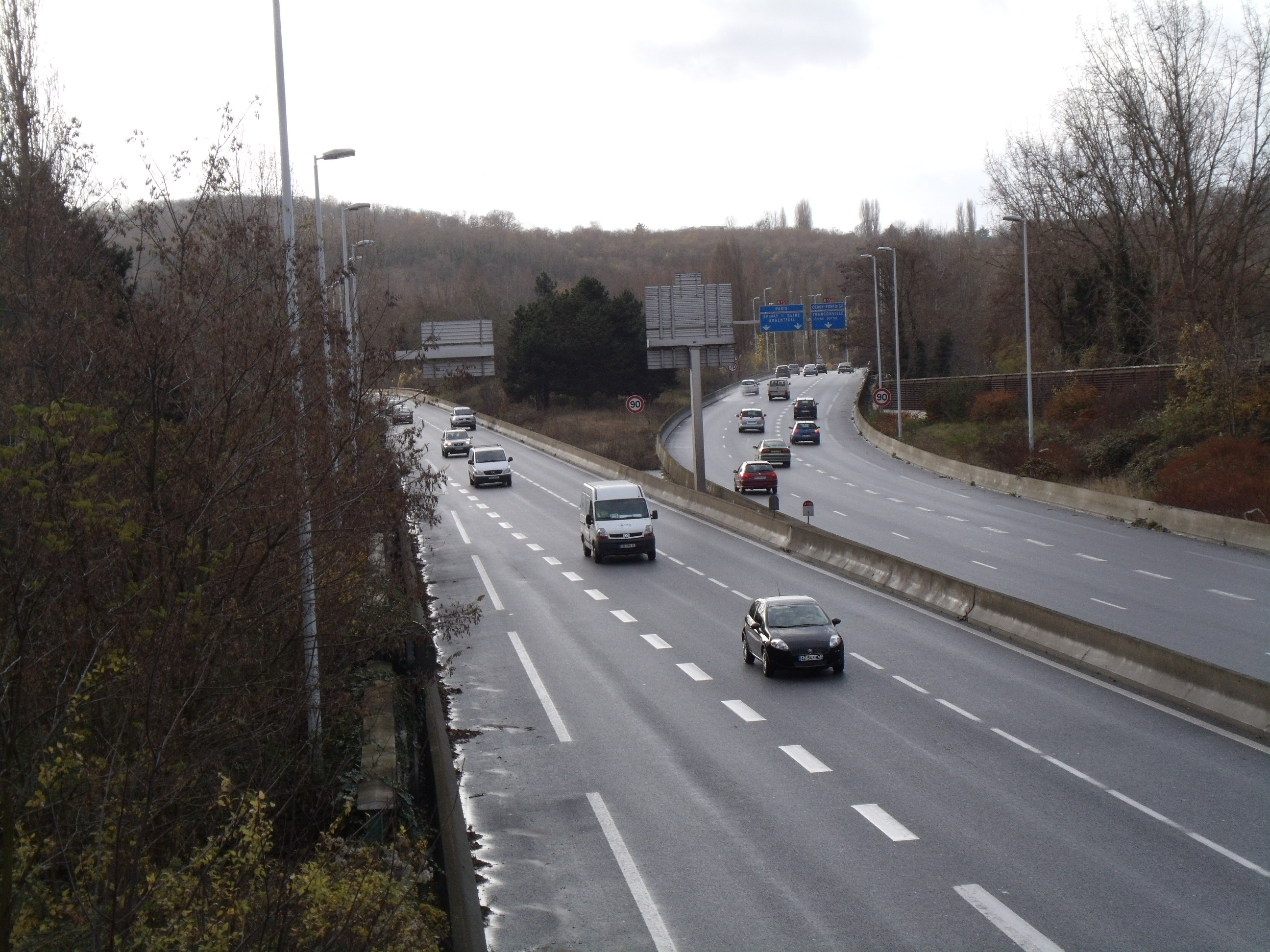
A115 near junction of A15

The motorway first linked Sannois to Beauchamp then Taverny in 2000 by a 1 km long tunnel. The last part of the motorway was opened in September 2004, linking Taverny to Méry-sur-Oise and thus linking the RN 184 to the A15.

== List of junctions ==
Region	Department	km	mi	Junctions	Destinations	Notes
Île-de-France	Val-d'Oise	0.0	0.0	A15 - A115	Paris, Argenteuil, Épinay-sur-Seine	
Île-de-France	Val-d'Oise	0.0	0.0	A15 - A115	Cergy-Pontoise, Franconville - Épine Guyon	
Île-de-France	Val-d'Oise	1.1	0.68	1 : Franconville	Sannois, Ermont, Franconville - centre	
Île-de-France	Val-d'Oise	2.7	1.7	2 : Le Plessis-Bouchard	Eaubonne, Le Plessis-Bouchard - centre	
Île-de-France	Val-d'Oise	3.6	2.2	3 : Saint-Leu-la-Forêt	Saint-Leu-la-Forêt, Le Plessis-Bouchard - Zone d'Activités	Entry and exit from Paris
Île-de-France	Val-d'Oise	5.9	3.7	4 : Taverny	Taverny - centre, Beauchamp - centre	
Île-de-France	Val-d'Oise	7.8	4.8	5 : Bessancourt	Bessancourt, Taverny - Les Lignieres, Z. A. Beauchamp-Taverny	
Île-de-France	Val-d'Oise	10.7	6.6	RN 184 - A115	Méry-sur-Oise - Z. A, Cergy-Pontoise	
Île-de-France	Val-d'Oise	10.7	6.6	RN 184 - A115	Calais, Amiens, Beauvais (A16), Ch.de.Gaulle, Auvers-sur-Oise, Frépillon, Méry-sur-Oise - centre	
1.000 mi = 1.609 km; 1.000 km = 0.621 mi
