= A15 autoroute =

Controlled-access highway from Gennevilliers to Cergy-Pontoise, France

A15 autoroute

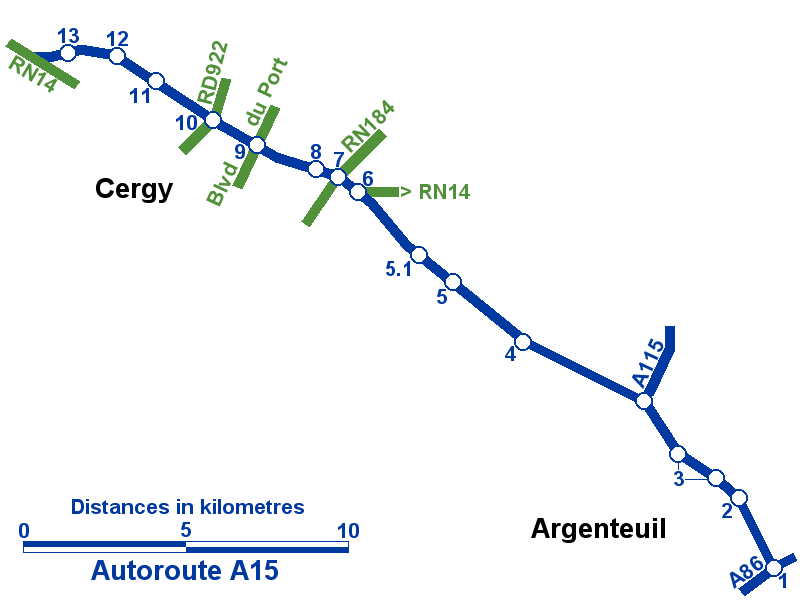

Route information
- Maintained by DIR Île-de-France
- Length: 21 km (13 mi)
- Existed: 1974–present

Major junctions
- West end: N 14 in Cergy

- A 115 in Sannois; N 104 in Éragny

- East end: A 86 in Gennevilliers

Location
- Country: France

Highway system
- Roads in France; Autoroutes; Routes nationales

The autoroute A15 is an autoroute in the western suburbs of Paris, France.

The motorway starts at Gennevilliers in Hauts-de-Seine and ends in Cergy-Pontoise in Val d'Oise. The A15 was built to relieve the congested RN14 between Paris and the Cergy-Pontoise new town. The A15 is operated by the Île-de-France Council. The motorway is 22 km (14 mi) in length and has no tolls The A15 serves Gennevilliers, Argenteuil, Pierrelaye in Eragny, Saint-Ouen-l'Aumône and Pontoise.

== List of junctions ==
Region	Department	km	mi	Junction	Destinations	Notes
Île-de-France	Hauts-de-Seine	0.0	0.0	A86 & RN 315 - A15	Nanterre, Versailles, La Défense, Paris - Porte Maillot (A14), Gennevilliers - centre, Port, Village, Saint-Denis, Ch.De.Gaulle (A1)	
Île-de-France	Hauts-de-Seine	0.0	0.0	A86 & RN 315 - A15	Paris- Porte de Clichy, Asnières, Clichy	
Île-de-France	Val-d'Oise	6	0.6	2 : Argenteuil	Argenteuil - centre, Orgemont, Z. I. de la Gare, Enghien-les-Bains, Saint-Gratien - Les Raguenets	
Île-de-France	Val-d'Oise	7	4.3	RD 170 - A15	Saint-Gratien - centre, Sarcelles, Montmorency, Sannois - Pasteur, Épinay-sur-Seine	
Île-de-France	Val-d'Oise	8.0	4.9	3 : Sannois - centre	Argenteuil - Les Coteaux, Sannois	Exit from Cergy
Île-de-France	Val-d'Oise	8.5	5.2	A115 - A15	Ermont, Franconville - centre, Calais, Beauvais, Amiens (A16)	Entry and exit from Paris
Île-de-France	Val-d'Oise	10	6.2	3.1 : Sannois - Le Moulin	Sannois, Franconville - centre, A115	Eastbound entry and Westbound exit
Île-de-France	Val-d'Oise	12	7.4	4 : Franconville	Montigny-lès-Cormeilles, Franconville - centre, L'Epine-Guyon, Z. A. Porte du Parisis	
Île-de-France	Val-d'Oise	14	8.7	5 : Patte d'Oie d'Herblay	Z. A. La Patte d'Oie d'Herblay, Beauchamp, Cormeilles-en-Parisis	
Île-de-France	Val-d'Oise	16	9.9	5.1 : Herblay - centre	Herblay-sur-Seine - centre, Pierrelaye, Z. A. Beauchamp-Taverny	
Île-de-France	Val-d'Oise	Aire de Pierrelaye				
Île-de-France	Val-d'Oise	19	11.8	6 : Pierrelaye	Pierrelaye	Entry and exit from Cergy
Île-de-France	Val-d'Oise	21	13.0	7 : Saint-Ouen-l'Aumône	Amiens (A16), Versailles, Éragny - centre, Saint-Ouen-l'Aumône, Conflans-Sainte-Honorine, Jouy-le-Moutier, Ch.de.Gaulle (RN 104), P.A des Bellevues	
Île-de-France	Val-d'Oise	22	13.6	8 : Éragny	Éragny - Le Village	Westbound entry and exit
Île-de-France	Val-d'Oise	23	14.3	9 : Cergy	Cergy - Préfecture, Pontoise - centre	
Île-de-France	Val-d'Oise	24	14.9	10 : Pontoise ( RD 915 - A15)	Pontoise - Les Louvrais, Osny - L'Oseraie, Marines, Cergy-Pontoise, Cormeilles-en-Vexin, Centre hospitalier	
Île-de-France	Val-d'Oise	A 15 becomes N 14				
Île-de-France	Val-d'Oise	26	16.1	11 : Osny	Osny, Cergy - Saint-Christophe	
Île-de-France	Val-d'Oise	27	16.7	12 : Puiseux-Pontoise	Puiseux-Pontoise, Vauréal, Jouy-le-Moutier	
Île-de-France	Val-d'Oise	29	18.0	13 : Courdimanche	Cergy - Le Haut, Courdimanche, Boissy-l'Aillerie, Menucourt	
N 14 becomes D 14
1.000 mi = 1.609 km; 1.000 km = 0.621 mi
