= Montigny-lès-Cormeilles =

- Commune
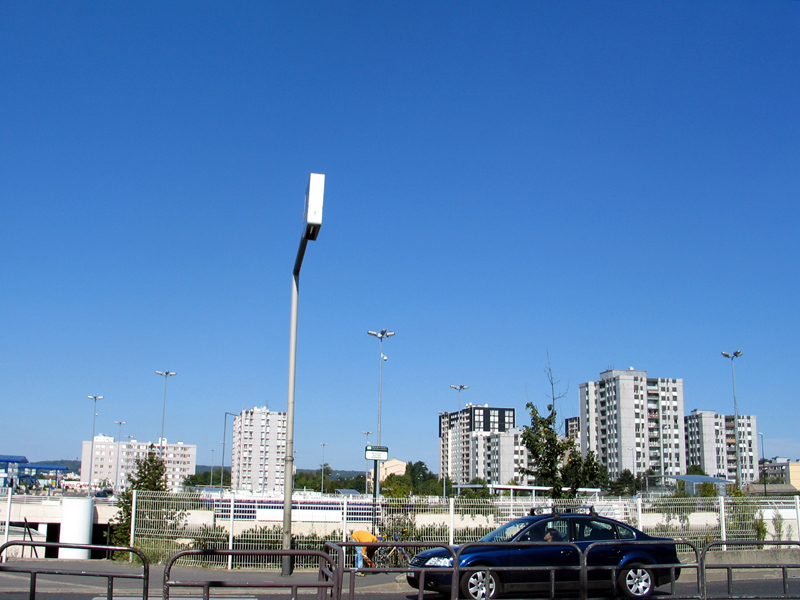
- Housing seen from the commercial area

- Coat of arms

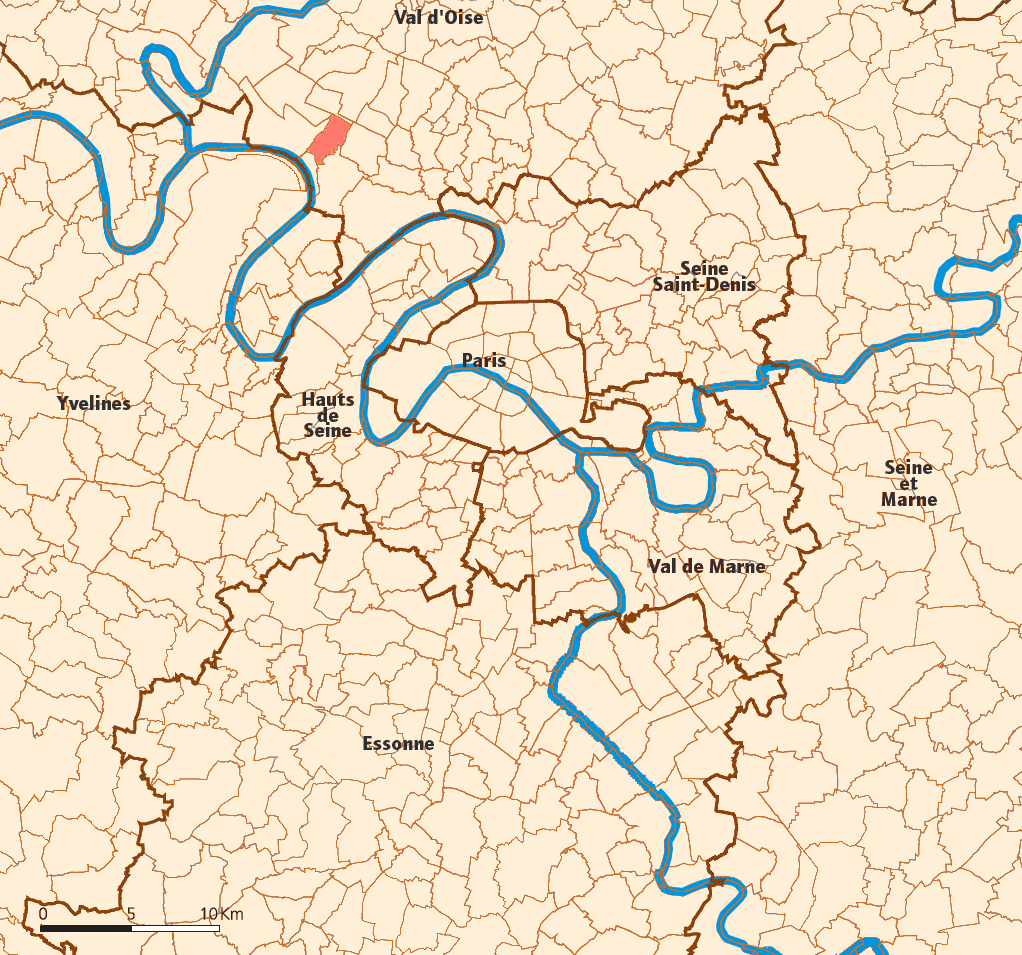
- Location (in red) within Paris inner and outer suburbs
- Location of Montigny-lès-Cormeilles
- Location within France Location within Île-de-France (region)
- Coordinates: 48°59′40″N 2°11′45″E
- Country: France
- Region: Île-de-France
- Department: Val-d'Oise
- Arrondissement: Argenteuil
- Canton: Herblay-sur-Seine
- Intercommunality: CA Val Parisis

Government
  - Mayor (2024–2026): Miloud Goual
- Area^{1}: 4.07 km^{2} (1.57 sq mi)
- Highest elevation: 168 m (551 ft)
- Lowest elevation: 61 m (200 ft)
- Population (2023): 22,457
  - Density: 5,520/km^{2} (14,300/sq mi)
- Time zone: UTC+01:00 (CET)
  - Summer (DST): UTC+02:00 (CEST)
- INSEE/Postal code: 95424 /95370
- ^{1} French Land Register data, which excludes lakes, ponds, glaciers > 1 km^{2} (0.386 sq mi or 247 acres) and river estuaries.

Montigny-lès-Cormeilles (French pronunciation: [mɔ̃tiɲi lɛ kɔʁmɛj], literally Montigny near Cormeilles) is a commune in Val d'Oise, in the northwestern suburbs of Paris, France. It is located 19.0 km (11.8 mi) from the center of Paris.

== History ==
On 30 March 1922, a part of the territory of Montigny-lès-Cormeilles was detached and merged with a part of the territory of Taverny and a part of the territory of Pierrelaye to create the commune of Beauchamp.

== Population ==
Historical population

Year	Pop.	±% p.a.
1793	280	—
1800	369	+4.02%
1806	347	−1.02%
1821	376	+0.54%
1831	464	+2.13%
1836	581	+4.60%
1841	472	−4.07%
1846	487	+0.63%
1851	538	+2.01%
1856	505	−1.26%
1861	526	+0.82%
1866	581	+2.01%
1872	577	−0.12%
1876	682	+4.27%
1881	781	+2.75%
1886	806	+0.63%
1891	705	−2.64%
1896	811	+2.84%
1901	791	−0.50%

Year	Pop.	±% p.a.
1906	858	+1.64%
1911	1,059	+4.30%
1921	1,456	+3.23%
1926	2,201	+8.62%
1931	2,852	+5.32%
1936	3,180	+2.20%
1946	3,166	−0.04%
1954	4,158	+3.47%
1962	5,555	+3.69%
1968	7,022	+3.98%
1975	8,288	+2.40%
1982	13,644	+7.38%
1990	17,012	+2.80%
1999	17,183	+0.11%
2007	18,526	+0.95%
2012	20,018	+1.56%
2017	21,601	+1.53%
2023	22,457	+0.65%

Source: EHESS and INSEE (1968-2023)

== Transport ==
Montigny-lès-Cormeilles is served by Montigny–Beauchamp station on Paris RER line C and on the Transilien Paris-Nord suburban rail line.

Montigny-lès-Cormeilles is also served by La Frette–Montigny station on the Transilien Paris-Saint-Lazare suburban rail line. This station, although administratively located on the territory of the neighboring commune of La Frette-sur-Seine, lies in fact very near the town center of Montigny-lès-Cormeilles.

== See also ==
- Cormeilles-en-Parisis
- Communes of the Val-d'Oise department
