= Agglomeration communities in France =

France intercommunal subdivision combining a commune and its suburbs

An agglomeration community (French: communauté d'agglomération, pronounced [kɔmynote daɡlɔmeʁasjɔ̃]) is a consortium of communes (municipalities) in France, created as a government structure by the Chevènement Law of 1999. It is one of four forms of an intercommunal structure with fiscal power, less integrated than a métropole or a communauté urbaine but more integrated than a communauté de communes. Agglomeration communities must consist of a contiguous grouping of communes with a total population of at least 50,000, including a central commune with at least 15,000 inhabitants. In the case of an agglomeration community that includes a prefecture, the 50,000 threshold is reduced to 30,000 and the 15,000 threshold does not apply.

As of January 2025, there are 230 agglomeration communities in France (214 in metropolitan France and 16 in the overseas departments). The population (as of 2022) of the agglomeration communities ranges from 28,318 inhabitants (CA Grand Verdun) to 364,744 inhabitants (CA Roissy Pays de France).

Several former communautés d'agglomération have been converted into communautés urbaines or métropoles, for instance those of Strasbourg, Rouen, Saint-Étienne and Caen.

== List of communautés d'agglomération ==
The table below lists the communautés d'agglomération with more than 200,000 inhabitants (as of 2022).

| Name | Seat | Number of communes | Population (2022) |
|---|---|---|---|
| CA Grand Annecy | Annecy | 34 | 216,729 |
| CA Grand Avignon | Avignon | 16 | 201,600 |
| CA Pays Basque | Bayonne | 158 | 334,316 |
| CA Béthune-Bruay, Artois-Lys Romane | Béthune | 100 | 278,892 |
| CA Cergy-Pontoise | Cergy | 13 | 219,620 |
| CA Cœur d'Essonne | Sainte-Geneviève-des-Bois | 21 | 209,923 |
| CA Lens – Liévin | Lens | 36 | 244,474 |
| CA Lorient Agglomération | Lorient | 25 | 213,310 |
| CA Mulhouse Alsace Agglomération | Mulhouse | 39 | 276,825 |
| CA Nîmes Métropole | Nîmes | 39 | 265,741 |
| CA Nord de La Réunion | Saint-Denis | 3 | 218,801 |
| CA Paris-Saclay | Orsay | 27 | 323,618 |
| CA Grand Paris Sud Seine-Essonne-Sénart | Courcouronnes | 23 | 363,513 |
| CA Paris - Vallée de la Marne | Torcy | 12 | 233,856 |
| CA Roissy Pays de France | Roissy-en-France | 42 | 364,744 |
| CA Saint Germain Boucles de Seine | Le Pecq | 19 | 347,443 |
| CA Saint-Quentin-en-Yvelines | Trappes | 12 | 236,416 |
| CA Territoire de la Côte Ouest | Le Port | 5 | 221,532 |
| CA Valence Romans Agglo | Alixan | 54 | 229,539 |
| CA Val Parisis | Beauchamp | 15 | 291,093 |
| CA Versailles Grand Parc | Versailles | 18 | 273,663 |

== See also ==
- Social housing in France
