= Cormeilles-en-Parisis =

- Commune
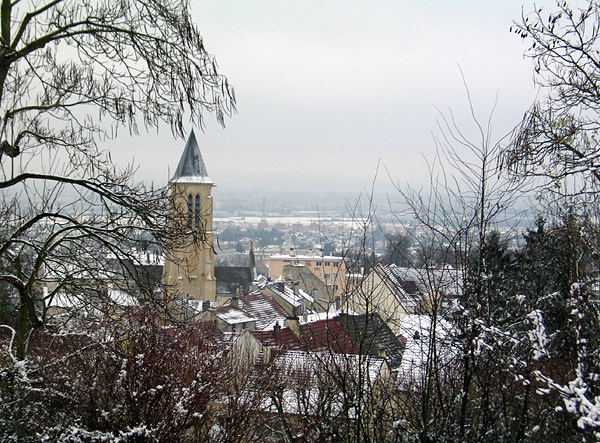
- A view of Cormeilles, seen from the park

- Coat of arms

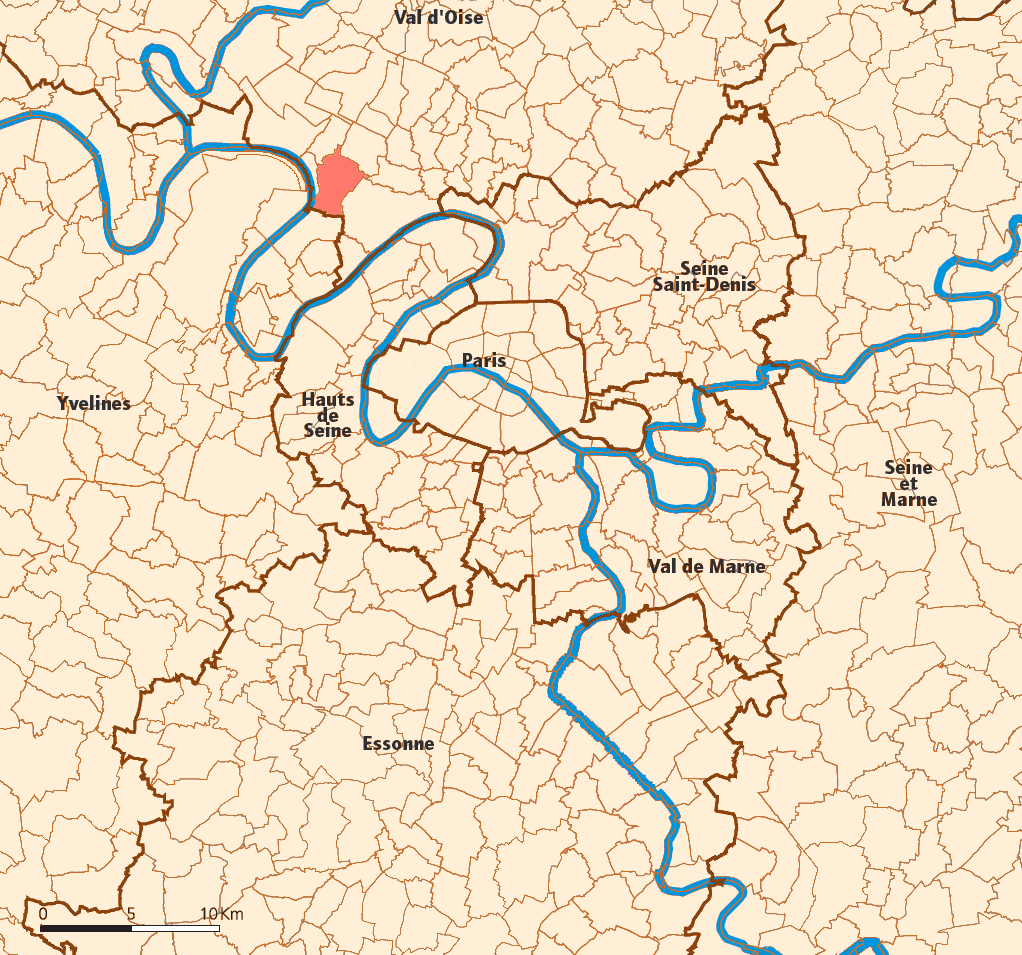
- Location (in red) within Paris inner and outer suburbs
- Location of Cormeilles-en-Parisis
- Location within France Location within Île-de-France (region)
- Coordinates: 48°58′26″N 2°12′05″E
- Country: France
- Region: Île-de-France
- Department: Val-d'Oise
- Arrondissement: Argenteuil
- Canton: Franconville
- Intercommunality: CA Val Parisis

Government
  - Mayor (2020–2026): Yannick Boedec
- Area^{1}: 8.48 km^{2} (3.27 sq mi)
- Elevation: 26 m (85 ft)
- Highest elevation: 170 m (560 ft)
- Lowest elevation: 22 m (72 ft)
- Population (2023): 27,292
  - Density: 3,220/km^{2} (8,340/sq mi)
- Time zone: UTC+01:00 (CET)
  - Summer (DST): UTC+02:00 (CEST)
- INSEE/Postal code: 95176 /95240
- ^{1} French Land Register data, which excludes lakes, ponds, glaciers > 1 km^{2} (0.386 sq mi or 247 acres) and river estuaries.

Cormeilles-en-Parisis (French pronunciation: [kɔʁmɛj ɑ̃ paʁizi], literally Cormeilles in Parisis) is a commune in the Val-d'Oise department in Île-de-France in Northern France.

Inhabitants are called Cormeillais(e).

== History ==
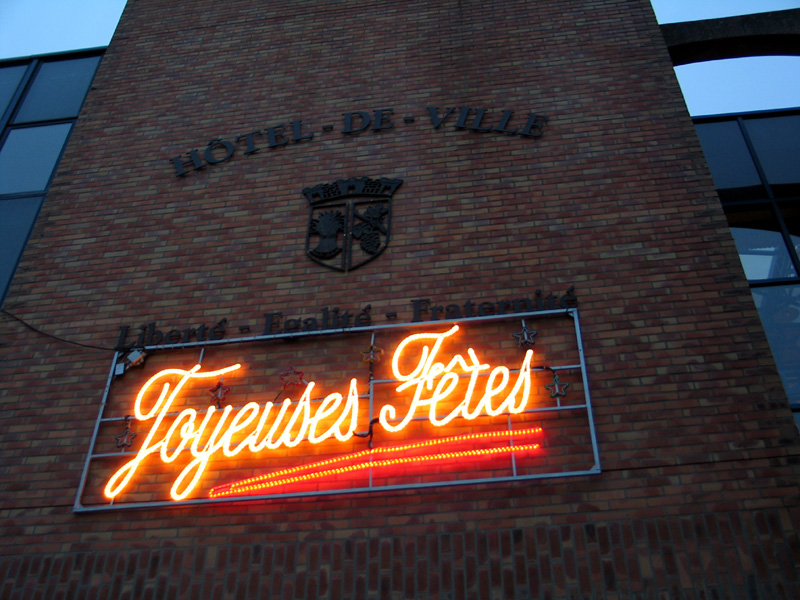
The extension to the Hôtel de Ville

The Hôtel de Ville was completed in 1869 and extended in 1983.

== Neighbouring communes ==
- Argenteuil
- La Frette-sur-Seine
- Franconville
- Herblay
- Montigny-lès-Cormeilles
- Sannois
- Sartrouville

== Population ==
Historical population

Year	Pop.	±% p.a.
1793	1,550	—
1800	1,330	−2.16%
1806	1,336	+0.08%
1821	1,280	−0.29%
1831	1,194	−0.69%
1836	1,255	+1.00%
1841	1,219	−0.58%
1846	1,242	+0.37%
1851	1,258	+0.26%
1856	1,275	+0.27%
1861	1,432	+2.35%
1866	1,560	+1.73%
1872	1,548	−0.13%
1876	2,070	+7.54%
1881	1,934	−1.35%
1886	1,836	−1.03%
1891	1,907	+0.76%
1896	2,285	+3.68%
1901	2,654	+3.04%

Year	Pop.	±% p.a.
1906	2,827	+1.27%
1911	3,240	+2.76%
1921	4,536	+3.42%
1926	6,169	+6.34%
1931	7,943	+5.19%
1936	8,460	+1.27%
1946	8,494	+0.04%
1954	10,638	+2.85%
1962	11,486	+0.96%
1968	13,829	+3.14%
1975	14,063	+0.24%
1982	14,484	+0.42%
1990	17,417	+2.33%
1999	19,643	+1.35%
2007	21,824	+1.32%
2012	23,369	+1.38%
2017	24,161	+0.67%
2023	27,292	+2.05%

Source: EHESS and INSEE (1968-2023)

== Transport ==
Cormeilles-en-Parisis is served by Cormeilles-en-Parisis station on the Transilien Paris-Saint-Lazare suburban rail line. It only takes 20 minutes to get to the station using ligne J from Paris Saint-Lazare.

== International relations ==
Cormeilles-en-Parisis is twinned with Ware, United Kingdom.

== Notable residents ==
Cormeilles-en-Parisis was the birthplace of:

- Louis Daguerre (1787–1851), artist and chemist who is recognized for his invention of the Daguerreotype process of photography
- Henri Cazalis (1840–1909), poet and man of letters
- Charles-Arthur Gonse (1838-1917), major general of the French Army, Figure in the Dreyfus affair.
- Robert Hue (born 1946), politician, former leader of French Communist Party (PCF)
- Boris Diaw (born 1982), former NBA player

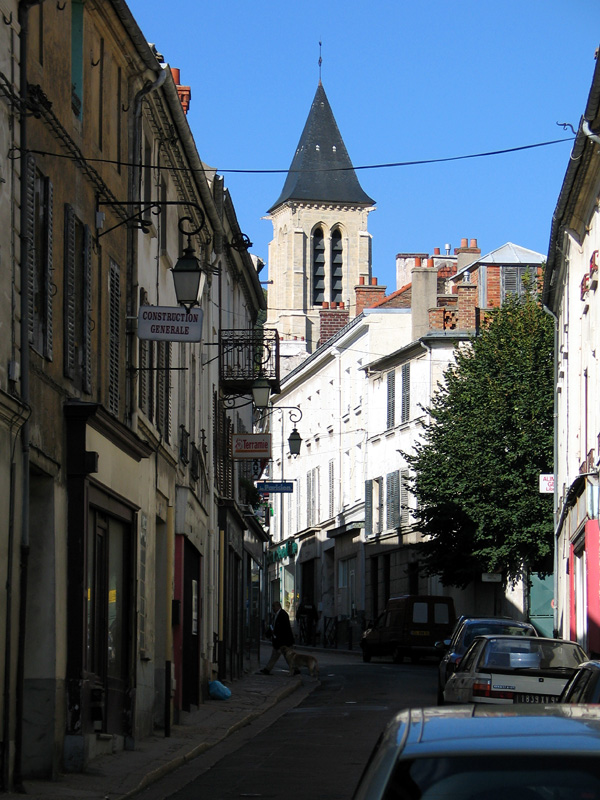
Rue Gabriel Péri

== See also ==
- Communes of the Val-d'Oise department
