= Taverny =

- Commune
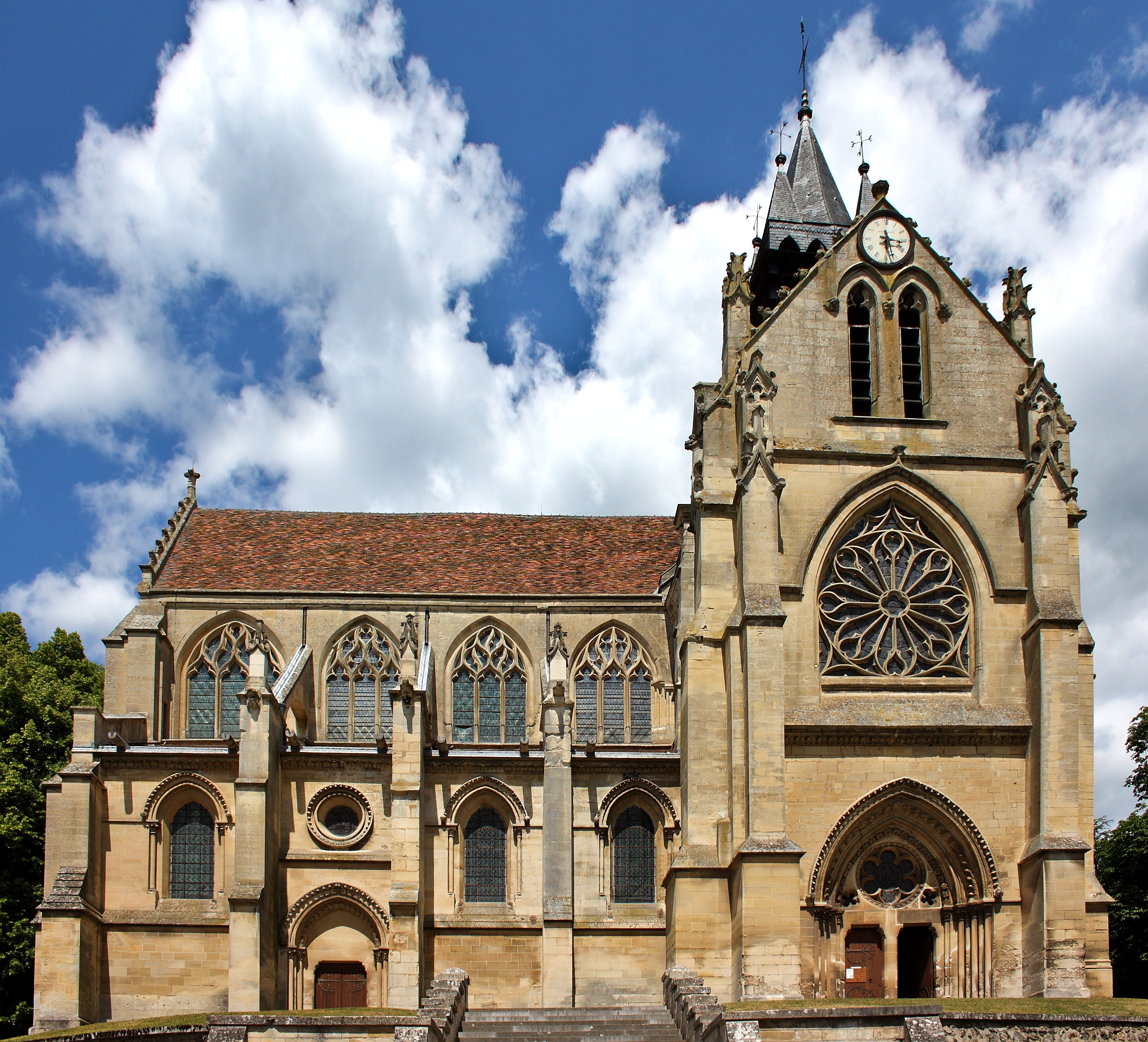
- The church of Our Lady, in Taverny

- Coat of arms

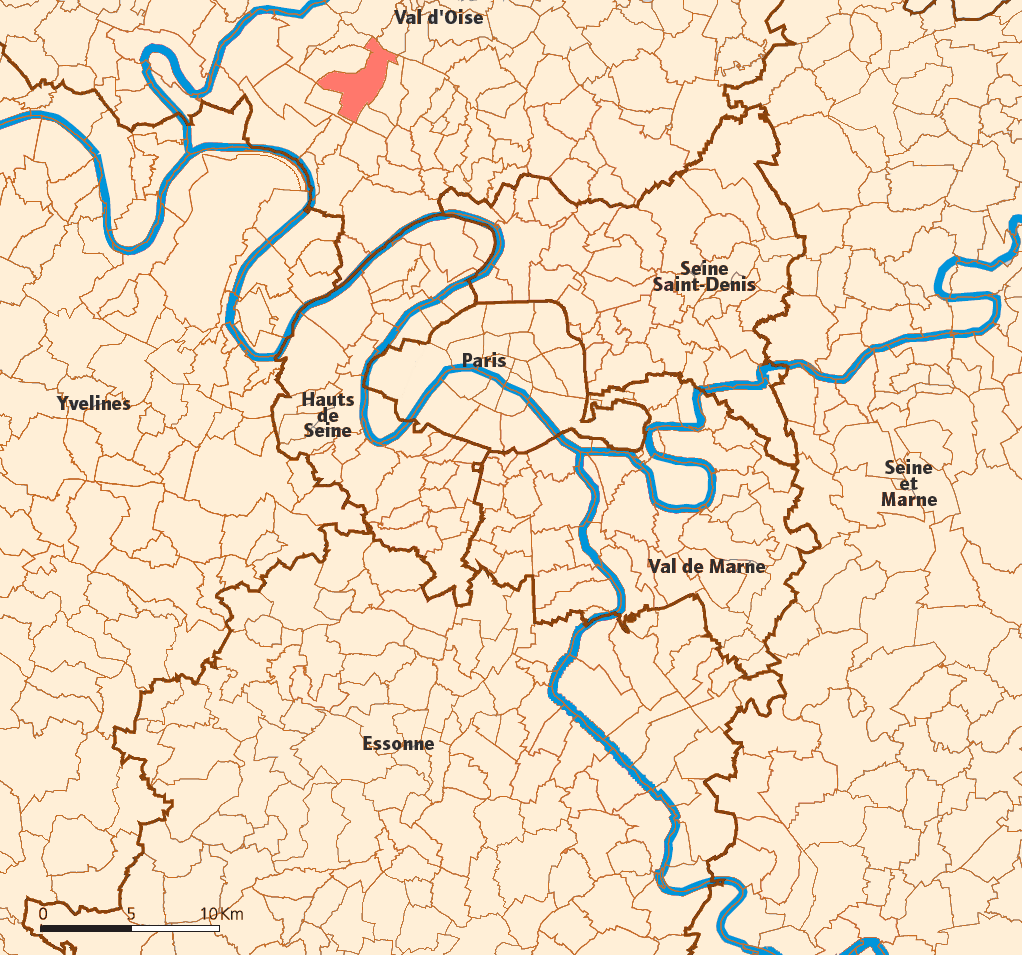
- Location (in red) within Paris inner and outer suburbs
- Location of Taverny
- Location within France Location within Île-de-France (region)
- Coordinates: 49°01′35″N 2°13′39″E
- Country: France
- Region: Île-de-France
- Department: Val-d'Oise
- Arrondissement: Argenteuil
- Canton: Taverny
- Intercommunality: CA Val Parisis

Government
  - Mayor (2020–2026): Florence Portelli (SL)
- Area^{1}: 10.48 km^{2} (4.05 sq mi)
- Highest elevation: 188 m (617 ft)
- Lowest elevation: 55 m (180 ft)
- Population (2023): 27,593
  - Density: 2,633/km^{2} (6,819/sq mi)
- Time zone: UTC+01:00 (CET)
  - Summer (DST): UTC+02:00 (CEST)
- INSEE/Postal code: 95607 /95150
- ^{1} French Land Register data, which excludes lakes, ponds, glaciers > 1 km^{2} (0.386 sq mi or 247 acres) and river estuaries.

Taverny (French pronunciation: [tavɛʁni]) is a commune in the northwestern suburbs of Paris, France. It is located 21.2 km (13.2 mi) from the center of Paris.

Inhabitants are called Tabernaciens.

== History ==
The name Taverny derives from the Latin tabernae, referring to a stall/shop.

In 1806 the commune of Taverny merged with the neighboring commune of Saint-Leu, resulting in the creation of the commune of Saint-Leu-Taverny.

In 1821 the commune of Saint-Leu-Taverny was demerged. Thus, Taverny and Saint-Leu were both restored as separate communes.

On 30 March 1922, a part of the territory of Taverny was detached and merged with a part of the territory of Montigny-lès-Cormeilles and a part of the territory of Pierrelaye to create the commune of Beauchamp.

Florence Portelli was elected Mayor of Taverny in 2014, and re-elected in 2020.

== Population ==
Historical population

Year	Pop.	±% p.a.
1793	1,375	—
1800	1,421	+0.47%
1831	1,269	−0.36%
1836	1,269	+0.00%
1841	1,229	−0.64%
1846	1,210	−0.31%
1851	1,225	+0.25%
1856	1,318	+1.47%
1861	1,456	+2.01%
1866	1,608	+2.01%
1872	1,582	−0.27%
1876	1,676	+1.45%
1881	1,709	+0.39%
1886	2,057	+3.78%
1891	2,042	−0.15%
1896	2,415	+3.41%
1901	2,743	+2.58%
1906	3,260	+3.51%

Year	Pop.	±% p.a.
1911	3,619	+2.11%
1921	4,519	+2.25%
1926	4,472	−0.21%
1931	5,303	+3.47%
1936	5,546	+0.90%
1946	5,899	+0.62%
1954	7,080	+2.31%
1962	8,606	+2.47%
1968	12,902	+6.98%
1975	16,963	+3.99%
1982	21,299	+3.31%
1990	25,151	+2.10%
1999	25,909	+0.33%
2007	26,228	+0.15%
2012	26,094	−0.10%
2017	26,441	+0.26%
2023	27,593	+0.71%

Source: EHESS and INSEE (1968-2023)

== Transport ==
Taverny is served by two stations on the Transilien Paris-Nord suburban rail line: Vaucelles and Taverny.

== Air force base 921 ==
Air force base 921 which hosts the commanders of the French airborne nuclear dissuasion force is situated in former quarries under the Montmorency forest in the commune of Taverny.

== International relations ==
=== Twin towns – sister cities ===
- Bingerville, Ivory Coast
- Lüdinghausen, Germany
- Novi Sad, Serbia (2020)
- Punta Umbría, Spain
- Sedlčany, Czech Republic
- Tavira, Portugal

== See also ==
- Communes of the Val-d'Oise department
