= Arrondissement of Argenteuil =

Coordinates: 48°56′51″N 2°14′56″E

Argenteuil
- Arrondissement
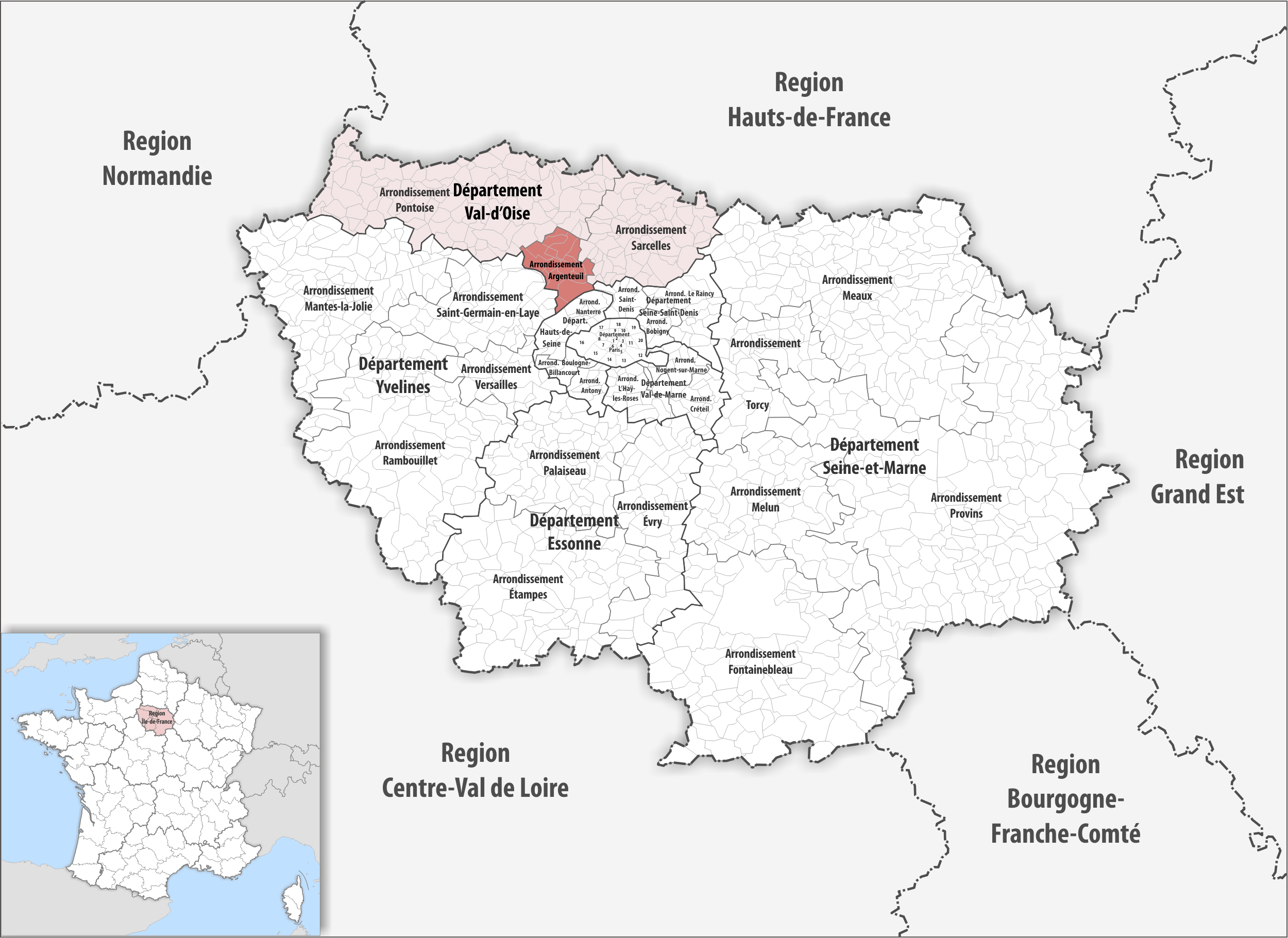
- Location within the region Île-de-France
- Country: France
- Region: Île-de-France
- Department: Val-d'Oise
- No. of communes: {{{nbcomm}}}
- Area: 108.6 km^{2} (41.9 sq mi)
- Population (2023): 433,454
  - Density: 3,991/km^{2} (10,340/sq mi)
- INSEE code: 951

The arrondissement of Argenteuil is an arrondissement of France in the Val-d'Oise department in the Île-de-France region. It has 17 communes. Its population is 425,515 (2021), and its area is 108.6 km^{2} (41.9 sq mi).

== Composition ==
The communes of the arrondissement of Argenteuil, and their INSEE codes, are:

1. Argenteuil (95018)
2. Beauchamp (95051)
3. Bessancourt (95060)
4. Bezons (95063)
5. Cormeilles-en-Parisis (95176)
6. Eaubonne (95203)
7. Ermont (95219)
8. Franconville (95252)
9. Frépillon (95256)
10. La Frette-sur-Seine (95257)
11. Herblay-sur-Seine (95306)
12. Montigny-lès-Cormeilles (95424)
13. Pierrelaye (95488)
14. Le Plessis-Bouchard (95491)
15. Saint-Leu-la-Forêt (95563)
16. Sannois (95582)
17. Taverny (95607)

== History ==
The arrondissement of Argenteuil was created in 1966 as part of the department Seine-et-Oise. In 1968 it became part of the new department Val-d'Oise. At the January 2017 reorganisation of the arrondissements of Val-d'Oise, it received 10 communes from the arrondissement of Pontoise.

As a result of the reorganisation of the cantons of France which came into effect in 2015, the borders of the cantons are no longer related to the borders of the arrondissements. The cantons of the arrondissement of Argenteuil were, as of January 2015:

1. Argenteuil-Est
2. Argenteuil-Nord
3. Argenteuil-Ouest
4. Bezons
5. Cormeilles-en-Parisis
6. Herblay
7. Sannois
