= Sylvie Oussenko =

French mezzo-soprano and writer

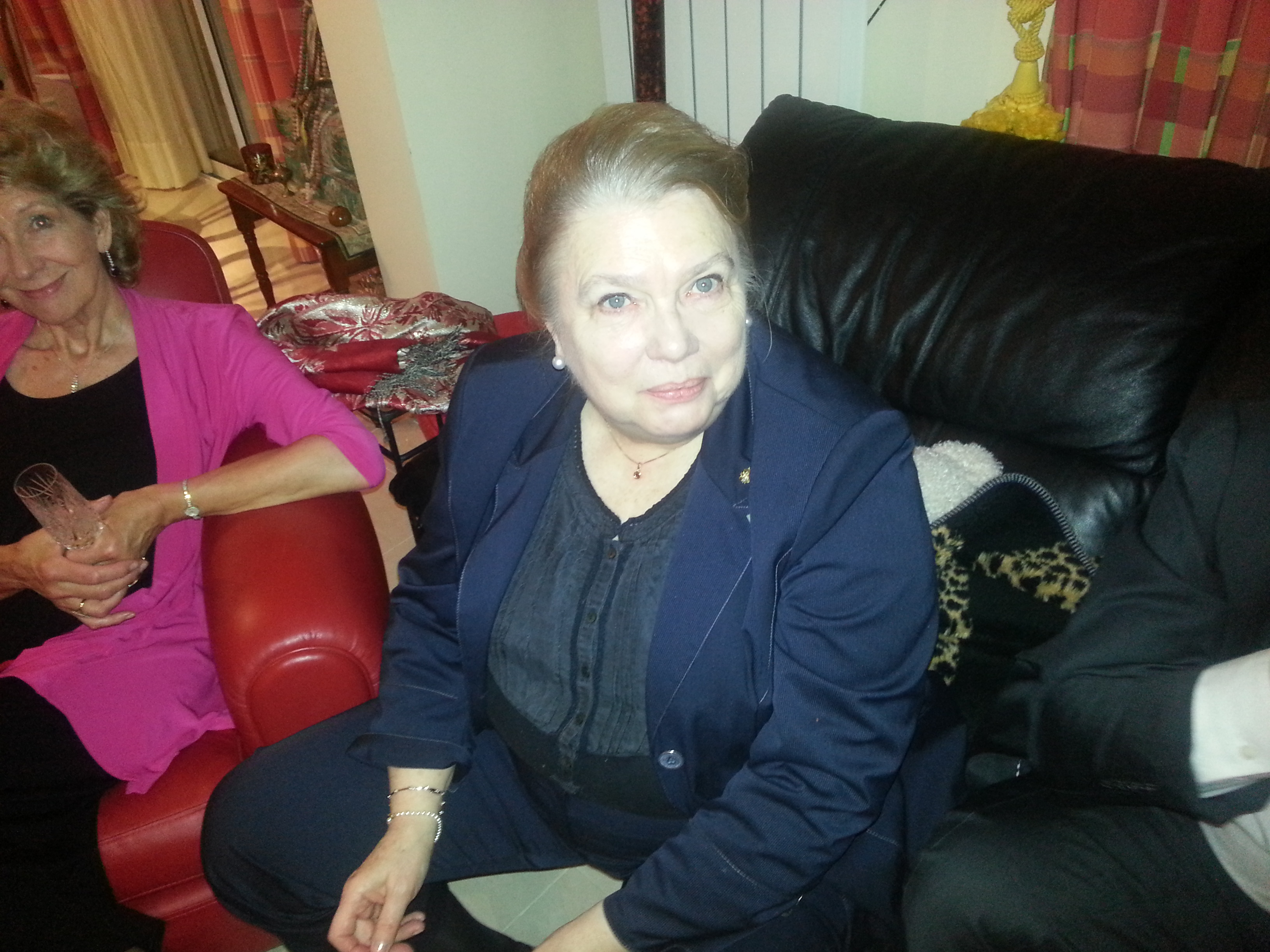
- Oussenko in 2013
- Born: June 5, 1945 (age 79); Saint-Leu-la-Forêt, France

Sylvie Oussenko (born 5 June 1945) is a contemporary French mezzo-soprano and writer.

== Biography ==
Born in Saint-Leu-la-Forêt, after a classical baccalaureate degree (Latin-Greek), Oussenko entered the Institut Catholique de Paris, then at the Sorbonne for a degree in philosophy, while taking singing lessons with Paul Derenne, then with Franz Müller-Heuser in Cologne and drama classes with Dominique Rozan, sociétaire of the Comédie-Française.

She made her stage debut in 1977 as Mélisande in Debussy's Pelléas et Mélisande at Besançon.

She worked on the repertoire with vocal coach Irène Aïtoff, with whom she gave her first recital devoted to lieder and melodies by Franz Liszt in 1978: many others followed. At the same time, she obtained a postgraduate diploma in musicology and psychology at the Paris-Sorbonne University.

Then, opting for recital and oratorio, she created many melodies by Roger Calmel, Georges Delerue, Lucie Robert-Diessel, Noël Lee, Pierrette Mari, etc. that she recorded for the Cologne radio station (WDR III).

She works on an ongoing basis with pianists Françoise Tillard, Noël Lee, Lucie Robert-Diessel, and conductor Dominique Fanal.

Since the 1990s, she has devoted part of her activities to pedagogy and literature: since 2007, she has published fiction, poetry and music writings on a regular basis. She is also the author of several plays.

In 2013, the Quatre Mythologiques are put on music by Michel Decoust, song cycle on poems by Sylvie Oussenko (excerpts from the collection Pèlerinages).

On 10 December 2013, she married baritone Gabriel Bacquier.

== Distinctions ==
- Chevalier of the Ordre des Arts et des Lettres

== Publications ==
- Les Madrigaux de Bellone (short stories), éditions France Univers, 2007
- Chopin, Eyrolles, 2009
- L'Opéra tout simplement, Eyrolles, 2009
- Schumann, Eyrolles - 2010
- Pèlerinages, preface and illustrations by Gabriel Bacquier (poem), France Univers, 2010.
- Gabriel Bacquier, le génie de l'Interprétation (biographical essay), éditions MJW Fédition, 2011.
- Richard Wagner, in collaboration with François Poncet, Eyrolles, 2013
- Verdi, in collaboration with Gabriel Bacquier, Eyrolles, 2013

Translations

- Ludwig Tieck: Les Fils Aymon, Les Amours de la Belle Maguelone et de Pierre de Provence, La légende de Mélusine, Montpellier, éditions Grèges, 2008

== Discography ==
- Mélodies italiennes with Thierry Macé, piano (Concord, 1997)
- Berlioz' Les nuits d'été and Wagner's Wesendonck Lieder with Noël Lee, piano (Tam Attitudes, 2001)
