= Bessancourt station =

French railway station

Bessancourt
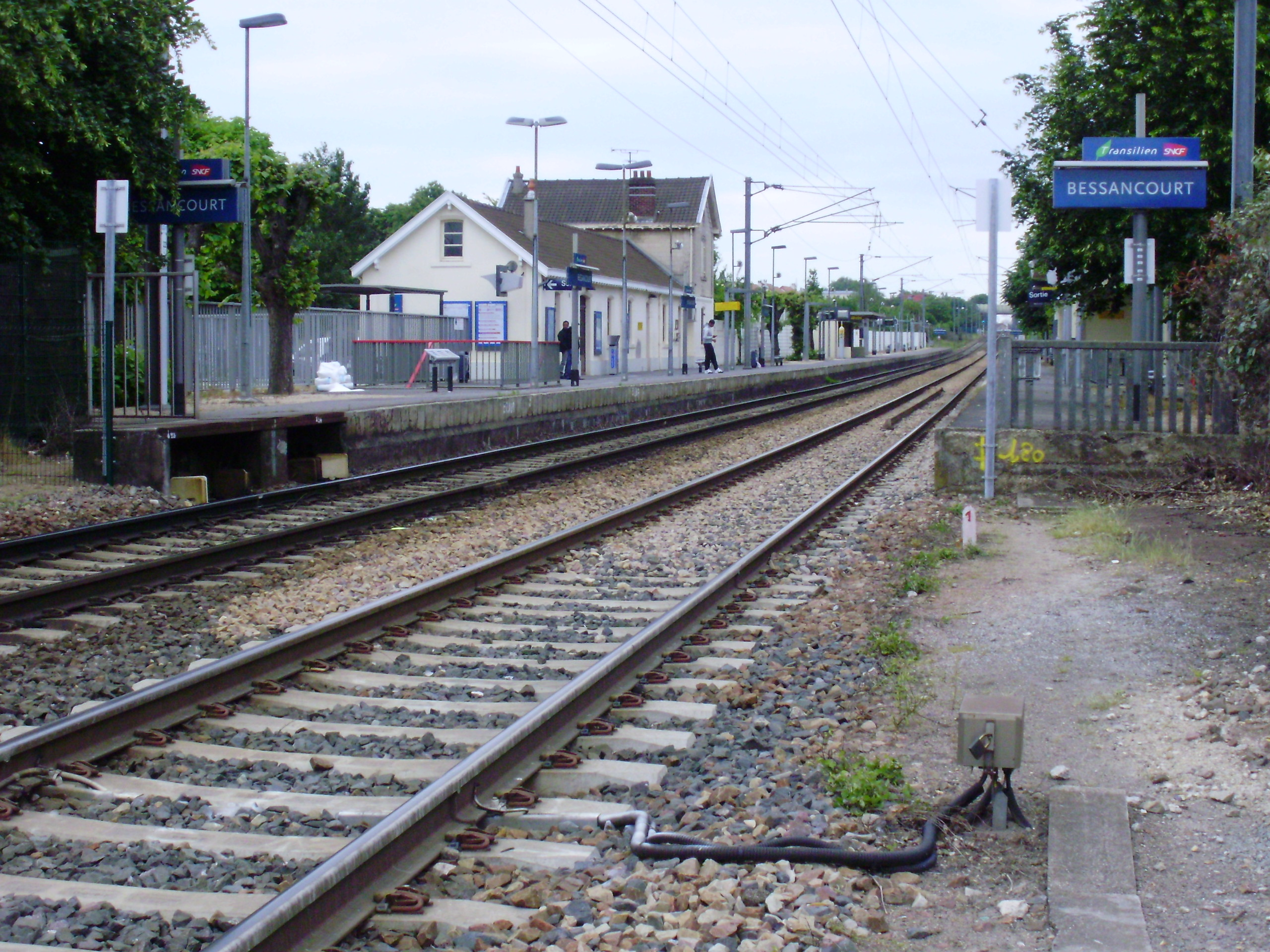

General information
- Location: Bessancourt, France
- Coordinates: 49°2′9″N 2°12′35″E
- Owner: SNCF
- Platforms: 2 platforms and 2 walkways

Other information
- Station code: 87276642
- Fare zone: 5

History
- Opened: 1876
- Electrified: 1970

Services
Preceding station	Transilien	Following station
Taverny towards Paris-Nord	Line H	Frépillon towards Persan–Beaumont
Location

Bessancourt is a railway station in the commune of Bessancourt (Val-d'Oise department), France. The station is served by Transilien H trains from Paris to Persan-Beaumont via Saint-Leu-la-Forêt. The daily number of passengers was between 500 and 2,500 in 2002. Bessancourt is located on the line from Ermont-Eaubonne to Valmondois, that was opened in 1876. The line was electrified in 1970.

== Bus connections ==
- Val Parisis: 30.18, 95.03A and B
- Haut Val-d'Oise : 1353

== See also ==
- List of SNCF stations in Île-de-France
