= Communauté d'agglomération Val Parisis =

Coordinates: 49.02°N 2.19°E

Val Parisis
- Communauté d'agglomération
- Country: France
- Region: Île-de-France
- Department: Val-d'Oise
- No. of communes: {{{nbcomm}}}
- Established: 2016
- Area: 87.2 km^{2} (33.7 sq mi)
- Population (2018): 278,166
  - Density: 3,190/km^{2} (8,260/sq mi)

The Communauté d'agglomération Val Parisis is the communauté d'agglomération, an intercommunal structure, in the northwestern suburbs of Paris. It is located in the Val-d'Oise department, in the Île-de-France region, northern France. It was created in January 2016. Its seat is in Beauchamp. Its area is 87.2 km^{2}. Its population was 278,166 in 2018.

== Composition ==
The communauté d'agglomération consists of the following 15 communes:

1. Beauchamp
2. Bessancourt
3. Cormeilles-en-Parisis
4. Eaubonne
5. Ermont
6. Franconville
7. Frépillon
8. La Frette-sur-Seine
9. Herblay-sur-Seine
10. Montigny-lès-Cormeilles
11. Pierrelaye
12. Le Plessis-Bouchard
13. Saint-Leu-la-Forêt
14. Sannois
15. Taverny
