= Route nationale 184 =

Road in France

The RN184 is a trunk road (nationale) in France linking Saint-Germain-en-Laye and the A16 near L'Isle-Adam. The road is for much of its course a dual carriageway.

== Route ==
The road runs through two forests; the Forest of Saint-Germain-en-Laye and the Forest of L'Isle-Adam, it also runs through the built up area of Cergy-Pontoise.

The RN184 is a dual carriageway between Saint-Germain-en-Laye and the Croix de Noailles, the Étang de Corra and L'Isle-Adam. It is a Limited-access road between Saint-Ouen-l'Aumône and the A16.

It traverses the following communes:

- Saint-Germain-en-Laye
- Conflans-Sainte-Honorine
- Éragny
- Saint-Ouen-l'Aumône
- Méry-sur-Oise
- Frépillon
- Villiers-Adam
- L'Isle-Adam
