= Hôtel de Ville, Cormeilles-en-Parisis =

Town hall in Cormeilles-en-Parisis, France

Hôtel de Ville
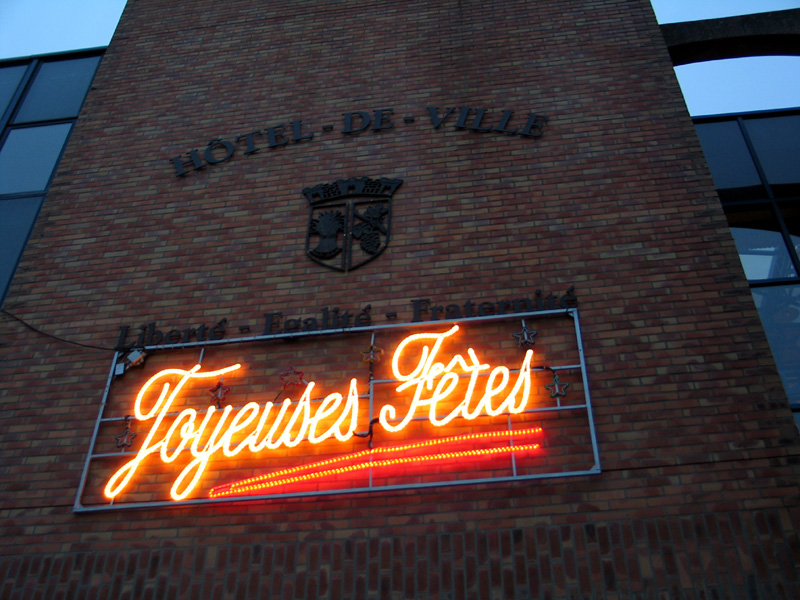
- The extension to the Hôtel de Ville in 2003
- Interactive map of the Hôtel de Ville area

General information
- Type: City hall
- Architectural style: Modern style
- Location: Cormeilles-en-Parisis, France
- Coordinates: 48.9760°N 2.1996°E
- Completed: 1983

The Hôtel de Ville (French pronunciation: [otɛl də vil], City Hall) is a municipal building in Cormeilles-en-Parisis, Val-d'Oise, in the northwestern suburbs of Paris, standing on Avenue Maurice Berteaux.

== History ==
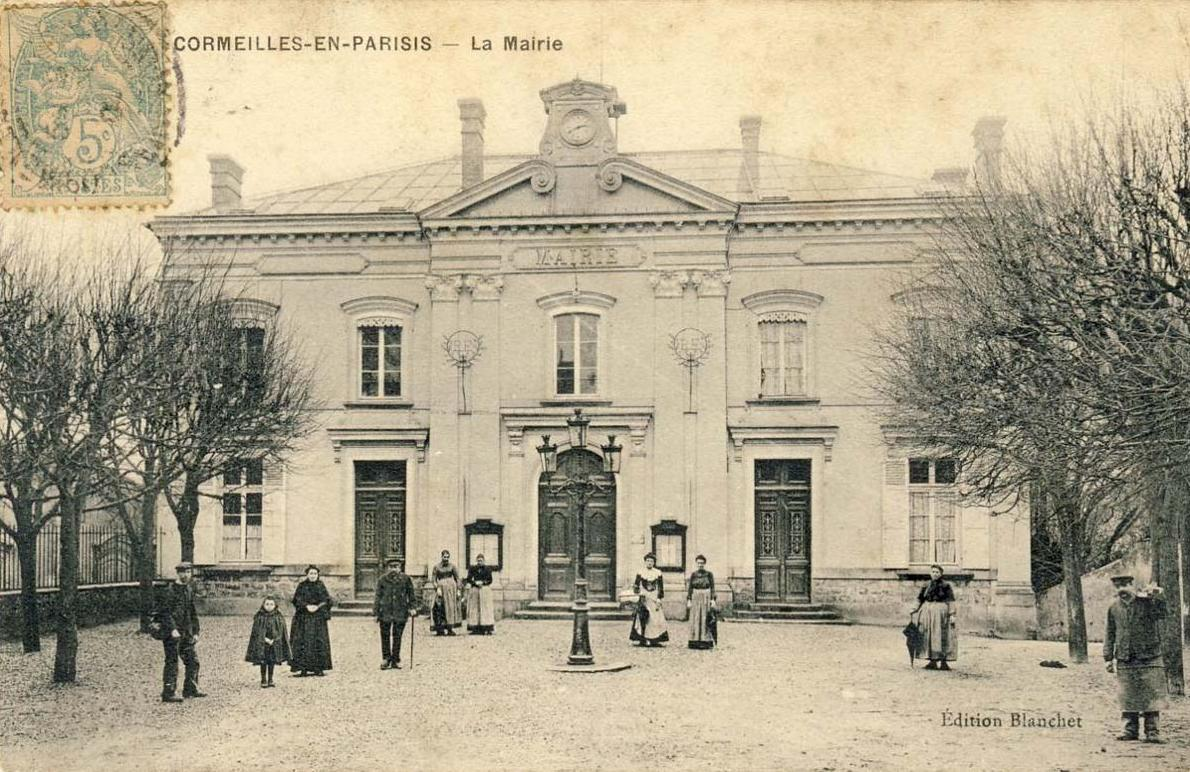
The combined town hall and school

Following the French Revolution, the new town council established a town hall on Rue Principale (now Rue Gabriel Péri). In 1868, a local notary, Jean Victor Thibault, agreed to give his house and garden to the town in accordance with the wishes of his deceased wife, Anne Emilie Gabrielle Chabrand. The house was converted into a hospital and the north end of the garden was identified as a site suitable for a combined town hall and school. The new building was designed in the neoclassical style, built in ashlar stone and was officially opened by the mayor, Sieur Montalant, on 24 October 1869.

The design involved a symmetrical main frontage of five bays facing onto what is now Rue Thibault Chabrand. The central bay featured a round headed doorway with a keystone flanked by pilasters supporting a cornice. There was a segmental headed window with a hood mould on the first floor and the whole bay was flanked by full-height pairs of Ionic order pilasters supporting an entablature, a pediment and a clock. The other bays were fenestrated by casement windows with cornices on the ground floor and by segmental-headed windows with hood moulds on the first floor. Internally, there was a classroom and a post office on the ground floor and a municipal office on the first floor.

After the postal service relocated to Rue Daguerre in 1880, the girls relocated a new school on what is now Avenue Maurice Berteaux in 1909, and the boys also relocated there in 1913, the town hall was used exclusively for municipal purposes. The classroom was then converted for use as the Salle des Mariages (wedding room).

In the early 1980s, following significant population growth, the council led by the mayor, Jean Ferrier, decided to commission a large extension to the east of the existing building. The new building was designed in the modern style, built in red brick and glass and was completed in 1983. The design of the three-storey extension involved an asymmetrical main frontage facing onto Avenue Maurice Berteaux. The first section of two bays was fenestrated by casement windows on all floors. The second section was faced in brick and was blind. The third section of three bays was arcaded on the ground floor and fenestrated by casement windows on the upper floors. The fourth section contained a glass doorway on the ground floor and was faced in brick on the upper floors and was surmounted by a hip roof. The right-hand section of two bays was fenestrated by recessed Diocletian windows on the ground floor and was faced in brick on the upper floors. The extension contained a new Salle du Conseil (council chamber).

A bust depicting President Charles de Gaulle was unveiled on the east side of the square in front of the original building by the mayor, Yannick Boëdec, on 17 June 2001. The police service, which had also been accommodated in the extension, relocated to a site near the train station in May 2023.
