= Frépillon station =

French railway station

Frépillon
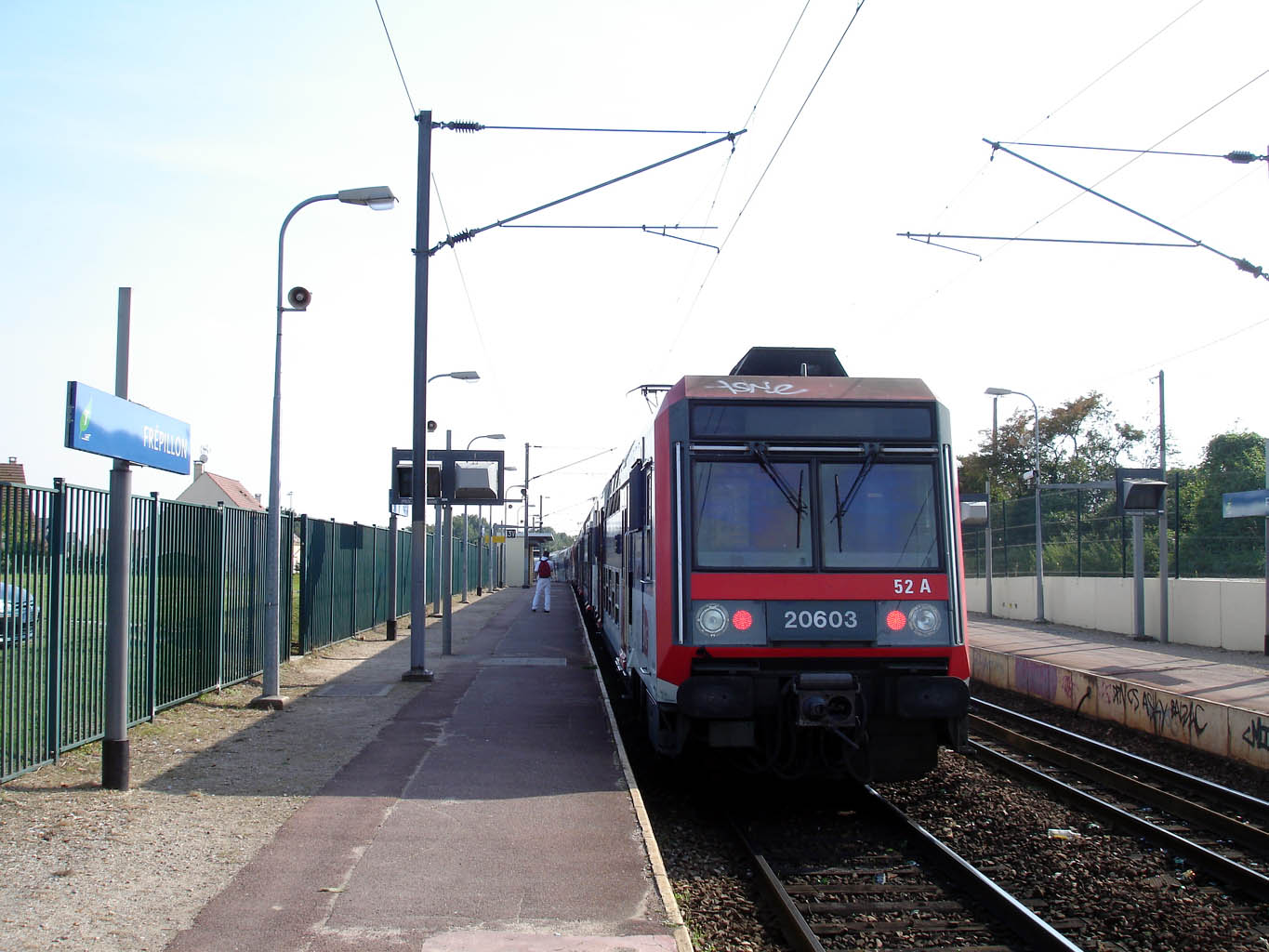

General information
- Location: Frépillon, France
- Coordinates: 49°2′47″N 2°11′49″E
- Owner: SNCF
- Platforms: 2 platforms and 2 walkways

Other information
- Station code: 87276659
- Fare zone: 5

History
- Opened: 1876

Services
Preceding station	Transilien	Following station
Bessancourt towards Paris-Nord	Line H	Méry-sur-Oise towards Persan–Beaumont
Location

Frépillon is a railway station in the commune of Frépillon (Val-d'Oise department), France. The station is served by Transilien H trains from Paris to Persan-Beaumont via Saint-Leu-la-Forêt. The daily number of passengers was less than 500 in 2002. Frépillon is located on the line from Ermont-Eaubonne to Valmondois, that was opened in 1876. The line was electrified in 1970.

== Bus connections ==
- Val Parisis: 95.03A and B
- Haut Val-d'Oise : 1353

== See also ==
- List of SNCF stations in Île-de-France
