= Le Plessis-Bouchard =

- Commune
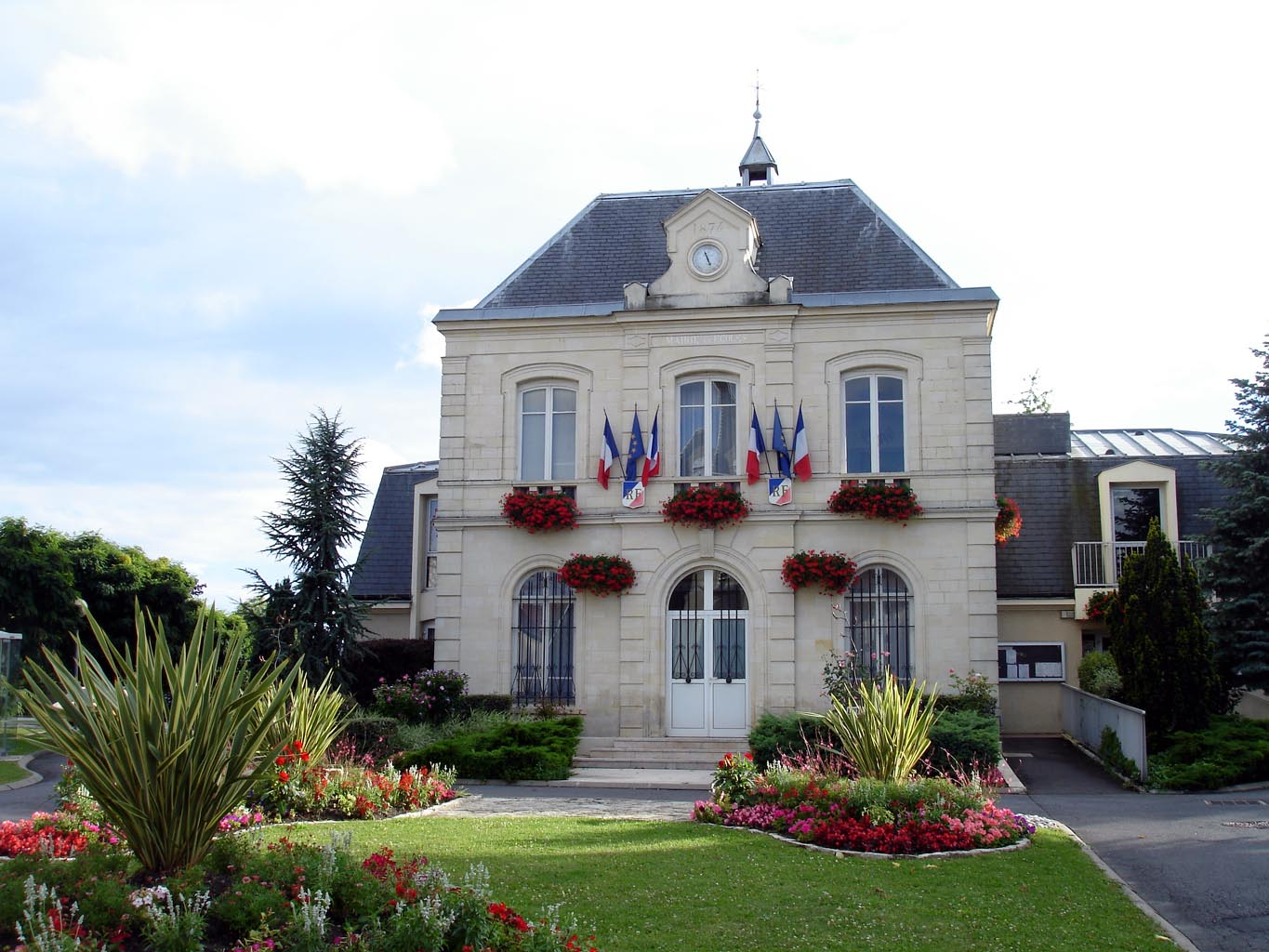
- Town hall

- Coat of arms
- Location of Le Plessis-Bouchard
- Location within France Location within Île-de-France (region)
- Coordinates: 49°00′12″N 2°14′15″E
- Country: France
- Region: Île-de-France
- Department: Val-d'Oise
- Arrondissement: Argenteuil
- Canton: Domont
- Intercommunality: CA Val Parisis

Government
  - Mayor (2020–2026): Gérard Lambert-Motte
- Area^{1}: 2.69 km^{2} (1.04 sq mi)
- Highest elevation: 81 m (266 ft)
- Lowest elevation: 57 m (187 ft)
- Population (2023): 8,518
  - Density: 3,170/km^{2} (8,200/sq mi)
- Time zone: UTC+01:00 (CET)
  - Summer (DST): UTC+02:00 (CEST)
- INSEE/Postal code: 95491 /95130
- ^{1} French Land Register data, which excludes lakes, ponds, glaciers > 1 km^{2} (0.386 sq mi or 247 acres) and river estuaries.

Le Plessis-Bouchard (French pronunciation: [lə plɛsi buʃaʁ]) is a commune in the Val-d'Oise department in Île-de-France in northern France.

== Population ==
Historical population
Year	Pop.	±% p.a.
1968	3,820	—
1975	5,600	+5.62%
1982	5,400	−0.52%
1990	6,138	+1.61%
1999	7,006	+1.48%
2007	7,623	+1.06%
2012	7,840	+0.56%
2017	8,408	+1.41%
2023	8,518	+0.22%
Source: INSEE

== History ==
=== Antiquity and the Middle Ages ===
At an undetermined time, the first inhabitants of Le Plessis-Bouchard settled in a rather inhospitable environment of woods, heathland, and marshes. To protect themselves from wildlife coming from the nearby Forest of Boissy (deer, roe deer, wild boar, etc.), they surrounded their hamlet with hurdles or hedges (plaisses), from which the village takes its name. However, they had one advantage, perhaps the reason for their settlement: the proximity of the Julius Caesar road, built in the first quarter of the 1st century.

In the 12th century, the hamlet of Le Plessis was part of the parish of Saint-Leu, in the Diocese of Paris. In 1192, Maurice de Sully, Bishop of Paris, established Le Plessis-Bouchard as a parish. The existing chapel then became the Church of Saint-Nicolas. According to the customs of the time, it was surrounded by a cemetery.

The oldest known mention of the name Le Plessis-Bouchard therefore dates back to the end of the 12th century.

=== Early Modern Period ===
Sparsely populated, the village of Le Plessis did not constitute a seigneury or a fief in itself, which explains the absence of a resident lord and a castle. There is also no record of a mill, forcing the inhabitants to use the mill of the lord of Saint-Leu-la-Forêt to grind their grain. He also exercised high, middle, and low justice. He shared the lands of Le Plessis with the Templar commandery of Cernay.

In the 14th century, Nicolas Louviers, provost of the merchants of Paris, built up a vast estate in the heart of the village through successive acquisitions.

At the beginning of the French Revolution, the inhabitants’ cahier de doléances (list of grievances) stated: “We are in extreme misery and unable to meet our tax obligations, given the high price of wheat” (Art. 9). Their grievances were numerous: impassable roads, incursions of forest wildlife, lack of access to drinking water, and more.

The first mayor of Le Plessis-Bouchard, a certain Roch Alline, was quickly dismissed (1794). The church, closed in 1793, did not reopen until 1804.

=== Contemporary Period ===
In the 19th century, Le Plessis-Bouchard underwent significant changes: creation of the first town hall–school (1840), relocation of the cemetery (1851), construction of a fountain (1862), and more. In 1874, the new town hall–school welcomed around fifty pupils, boys and girls together, gathered in a single classroom. By the end of the century, the population was estimated at nearly 400 inhabitants.

The town’s growth is fairly recent, beginning in the early 20th century, mainly due to the arrival of the railway nearby (Franconville).

== Twin towns ==
- Niederstetten (Germany).

== See also ==
- Communes of the Val-d'Oise department
