= Canton of Herblay-sur-Seine =

Coordinates: 49.00°N 2.16°E

The canton of Herblay-sur-Seine (before 2021: Herblay) is an administrative division of the Val-d'Oise department, Île-de-France region, northern France. Its borders were modified at the French canton reorganisation which came into effect in March 2015. Its seat is in Herblay-sur-Seine.

It consists of the following communes:

1. La Frette-sur-Seine
2. Herblay-sur-Seine
3. Montigny-lès-Cormeilles
