= Saint-Leu-la-Forêt =

- Commune
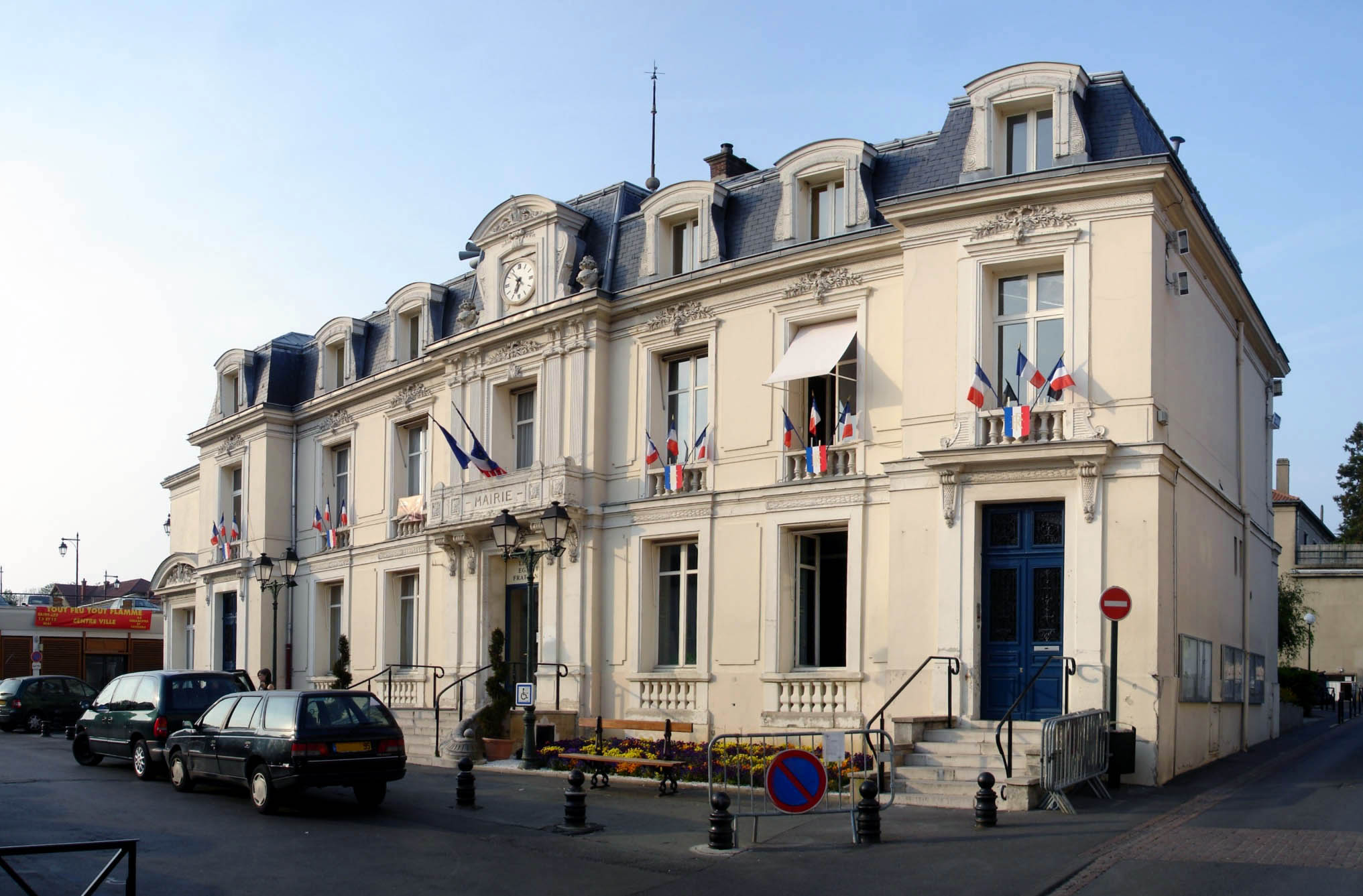
- Town hall

- Coat of arms

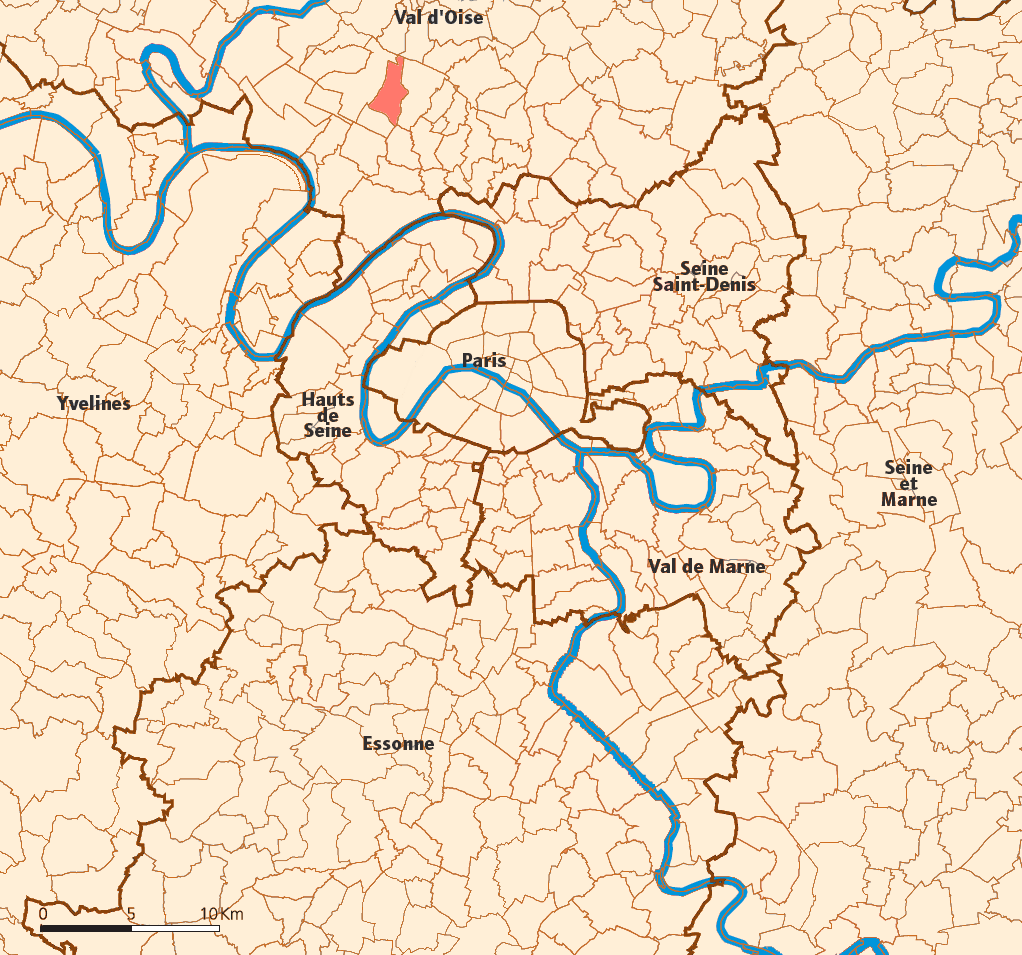
- Location (in red) within Paris inner and outer suburbs
- Location of Saint-Leu-la-Forêt
- Location within France Location within Île-de-France (region)
- Coordinates: 49°01′03″N 2°14′50″E
- Country: France
- Region: Île-de-France
- Department: Val-d'Oise
- Arrondissement: Argenteuil
- Canton: Domont
- Intercommunality: CA Val Parisis

Government
  - Mayor (2026–32): Loïc Vidal
- Area^{1}: 5.24 km^{2} (2.02 sq mi)
- Highest elevation: 191 m (627 ft)
- Lowest elevation: 57 m (187 ft)
- Population (2023): 16,138
  - Density: 3,080/km^{2} (7,980/sq mi)
- Demonym: Saint-Loupiens
- Time zone: UTC+01:00 (CET)
  - Summer (DST): UTC+02:00 (CEST)
- INSEE/Postal code: 95563 /95320
- Website: www.saint-leu-la-foret.fr
- ^{1} French Land Register data, which excludes lakes, ponds, glaciers > 1 km^{2} (0.386 sq mi or 247 acres) and river estuaries.

Saint-Leu-la-Forêt (French pronunciation: [sɛ̃ lø la fɔʁɛ]) is a commune in the Val-d'Oise department, in the northwestern outer suburbs of Paris, France. It is located 19.9 km (12.4 mi) from the centre of Paris.

== History ==
In 1806, the commune of Saint-Leu-la-Forêt merged with the neighboring commune of Taverny, resulting in the creation of the commune of Saint-Leu-Taverny.

In 1821, the commune of Saint-Leu-Taverny was demerged. Thus, Saint-Leu-la-Forêt and Taverny were both restored as separate communes.

== Population ==
Historical population
| Year | Pop. | ±% p.a. |
|---|---|---|
| 1968 | 10,004 | — |
| 1975 | 9,664 | −0.49% |
| 1982 | 11,627 | +2.68% |
| 1990 | 14,489 | +2.79% |
| 1999 | 15,127 | +0.48% |
| 2007 | 14,667 | −0.39% |
| 2012 | 14,748 | +0.11% |
| 2017 | 15,798 | +1.39% |
| 2023 | 16,138 | +0.36% |
Source: INSEE

== Transport ==
Saint-Leu-la-Forêt is served by Saint-Leu-la-Forêt station on the Transilien Paris-Nord suburban rail line.

== Cultural connections ==
- Louis Henri Joseph de Bourbon (1756–1830), the last Prince of Condé, was found dead, probably by suicide, at the Château de Saint-Leu on 27 August 1830.
- Louis Bonaparte, brother to Napoleon I and father to Napoleon III, is buried at Saint-Leu-la-Forêt.
- Wanda Landowska's villa in Saint-Leu-la-Forêt became a center for the performance and study of early music, particularly of the Baroque era.
- Eyvind Johnson lived in rue de Boissy from 1926 to 1930.
- Sylvie Oussenko (born in 1945), mezzo-soprano and writer, was born in Saint-Leu-la-Forêt.
- In Patrick Modiano's book So You Don't Get Lost in the Neighborhood, the narrator spends part of his childhood in the care of a teenage girl living in a mysterious house in Saint-Leu-la-Forêt.

== International relations ==
=== Twin towns – sister cities ===
- Wendlingen am Neckar, Germany
- Culcheth, United Kingdom

=== Partner cities ===
- Novi Sad, Serbia

== See also ==
- Communes of the Val-d'Oise department
- Castle of Saint-Leu
