= Bessancourt =

- Commune
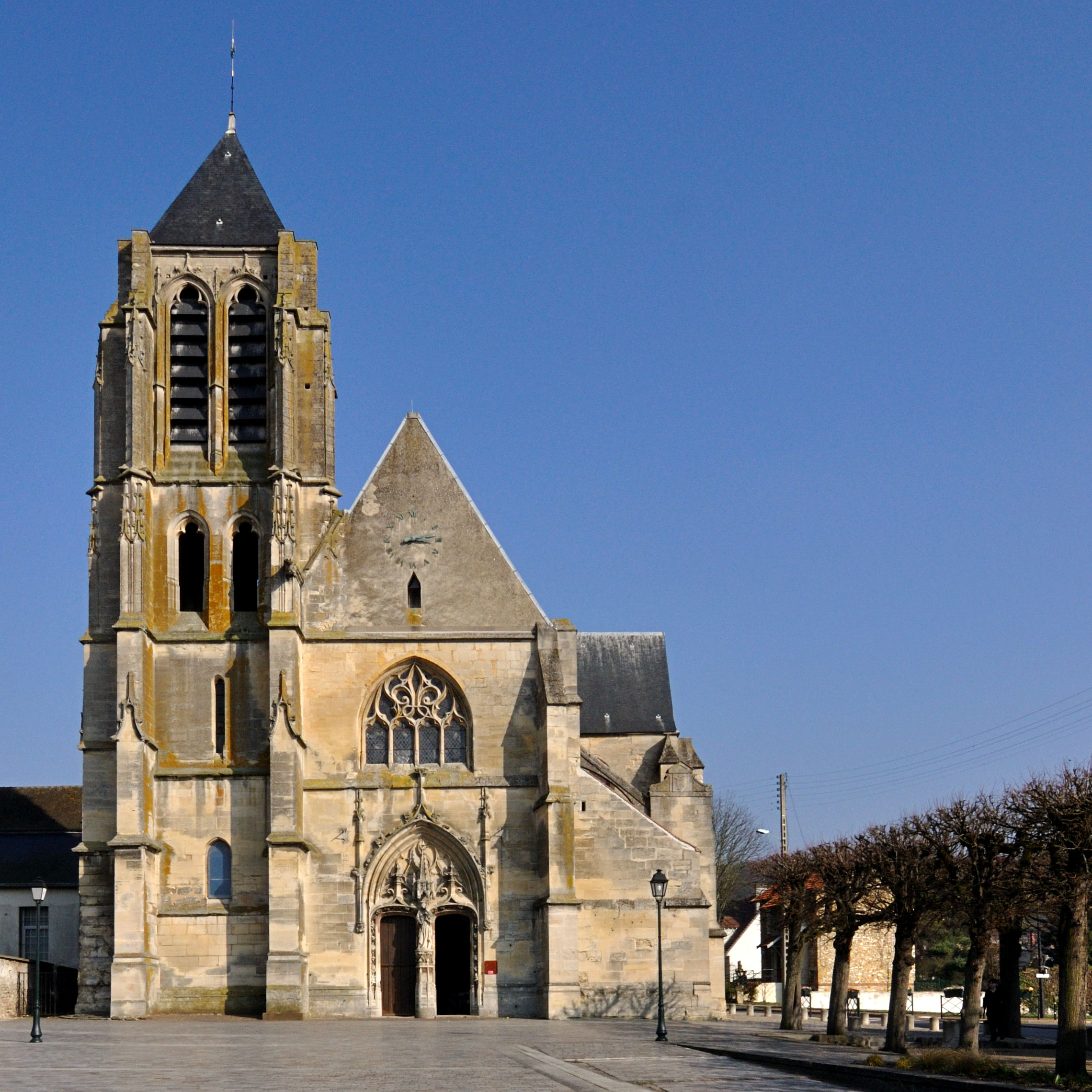
- The church St Gervais and St Protais in Bessancourt

- Coat of arms
- Location of Bessancourt
- Location within France Location within Île-de-France (region)
- Coordinates: 49°02′19″N 2°12′51″E
- Country: France
- Region: Île-de-France
- Department: Val-d'Oise
- Arrondissement: Argenteuil
- Canton: Taverny
- Intercommunality: CA Val Parisis

Government
  - Mayor (2020–2026): Jean-Christophe Poulet
- Area^{1}: 6.39 km^{2} (2.47 sq mi)
- Highest elevation: 171 m (561 ft)
- Lowest elevation: 49 m (161 ft)
- Population (2023): 8,869
  - Density: 1,390/km^{2} (3,590/sq mi)
- Time zone: UTC+01:00 (CET)
  - Summer (DST): UTC+02:00 (CEST)
- INSEE/Postal code: 95060 /95550
- ^{1} French Land Register data, which excludes lakes, ponds, glaciers > 1 km^{2} (0.386 sq mi or 247 acres) and river estuaries.

Bessancourt (French pronunciation: [bɛsɑ̃kuʁ]) is a commune in the Val-d'Oise department in Île-de-France in northern France. Bessancourt station has rail connections to Persan, Saint-Leu-la-Forêt and Paris.

== Population ==
Historical population
Year	Pop.	±% p.a.
1968	3,781	—
1975	5,978	+6.76%
1982	5,758	−0.53%
1990	6,429	+1.39%
1999	6,999	+0.95%
2007	7,231	+0.41%
2012	6,629	−1.72%
2017	7,318	+2.00%
2023	8,869	+3.26%
Source: INSEE

== Twin Towns ==
Bessancourt is twinned with:

- Holmes Chapel, Cheshire, United Kingdom since 1979

== See also ==
- Communes of the Val-d'Oise department
