= Frépillon =

- Commune
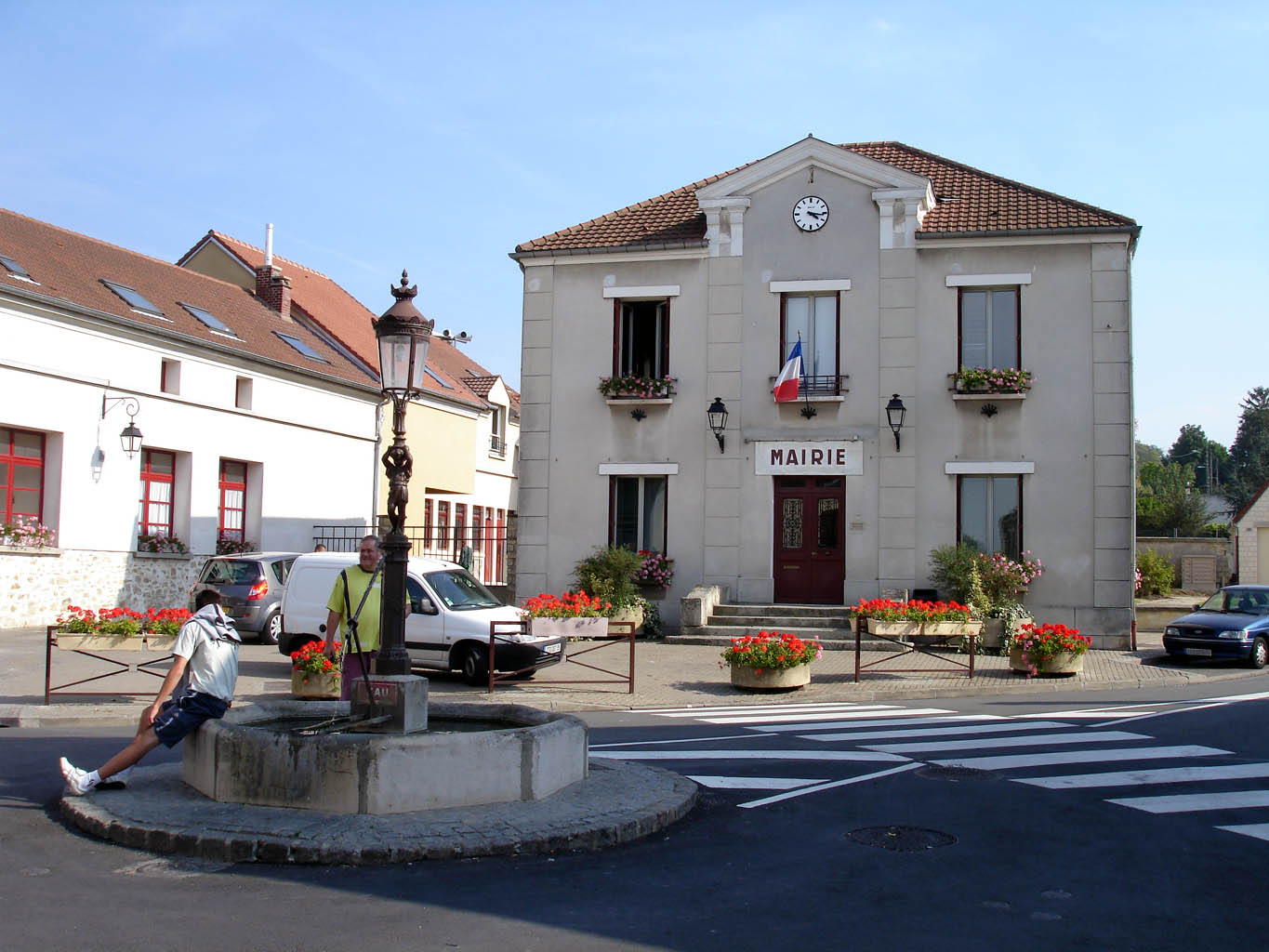
- Town hall

- Coat of arms
- Location of Frépillon
- Location within France Location within Île-de-France (region)
- Coordinates: 49°03′08″N 2°12′20″E
- Country: France
- Region: Île-de-France
- Department: Val-d'Oise
- Arrondissement: Argenteuil
- Canton: Saint-Ouen-l'Aumône
- Intercommunality: CA Val Parisis

Government
  - Mayor (2020–2026): Patricia Zeiss
- Area^{1}: 3.35 km^{2} (1.29 sq mi)
- Highest elevation: 165 m (541 ft)
- Lowest elevation: 60 m (200 ft)
- Population (2023): 3,317
  - Density: 990/km^{2} (2,560/sq mi)
- Time zone: UTC+01:00 (CET)
  - Summer (DST): UTC+02:00 (CEST)
- INSEE/Postal code: 95256 /95740
- ^{1} French Land Register data, which excludes lakes, ponds, glaciers > 1 km^{2} (0.386 sq mi or 247 acres) and river estuaries.

Frépillon (French pronunciation: [fʁepijɔ̃]) is a commune in the Val-d'Oise department and Île-de-France region of France. Frépillon station has rail connections to Persan, Saint-Leu-la-Forêt and Paris.

== Population ==
Historical population
Year	Pop.	±% p.a.
1968	1,229	—
1975	1,877	+6.24%
1982	2,033	+1.15%
1990	2,211	+1.05%
1999	2,262	+0.25%
2007	2,605	+1.78%
2012	2,860	+1.89%
2017	3,337	+3.13%
2023	3,317	−0.10%
Source: INSEE

== See also ==
- Communes of the Val-d'Oise department
