= Herblay-sur-Seine =

- Commune
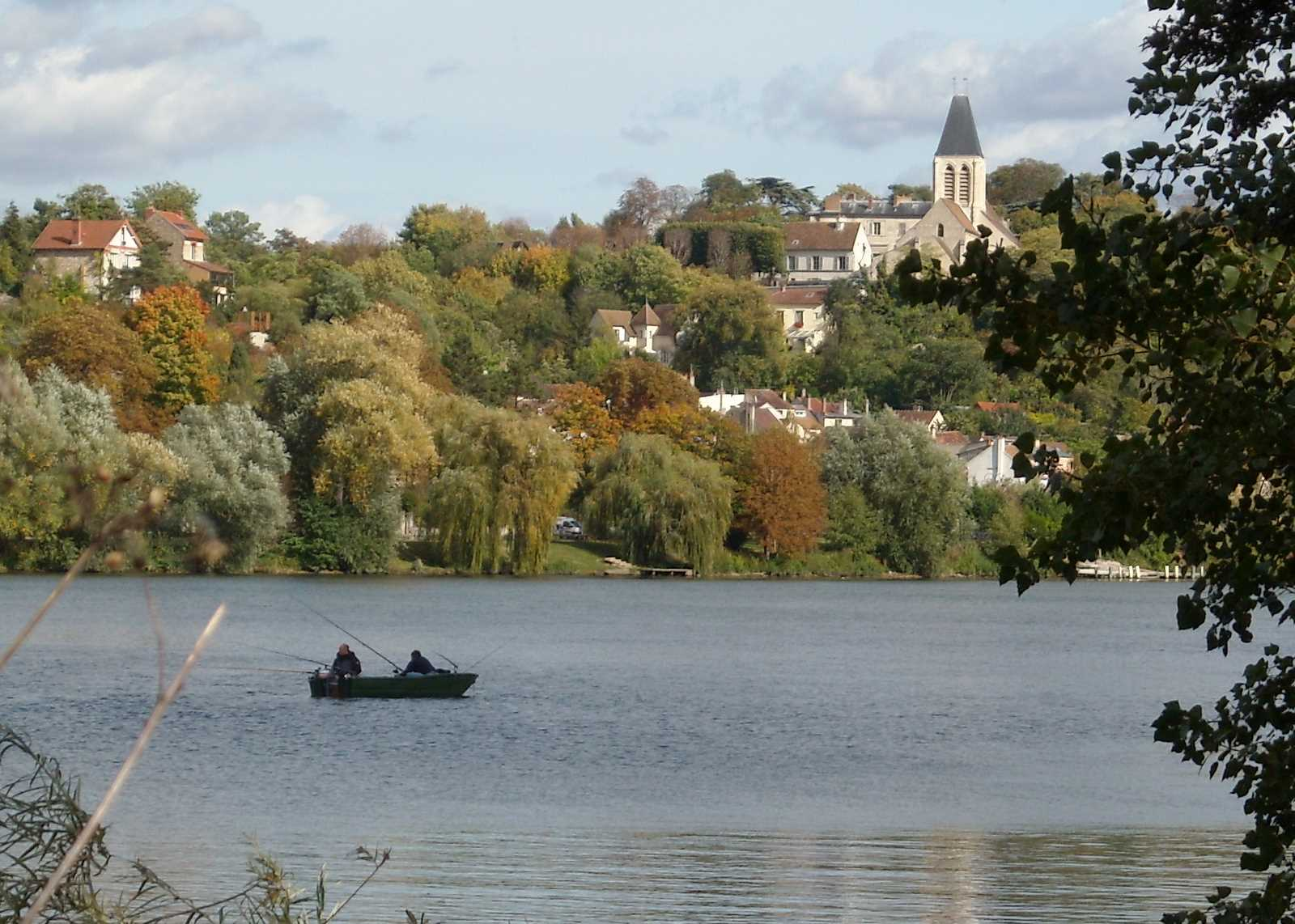
- The old village of Herblay, alongside the River Seine

- Coat of arms

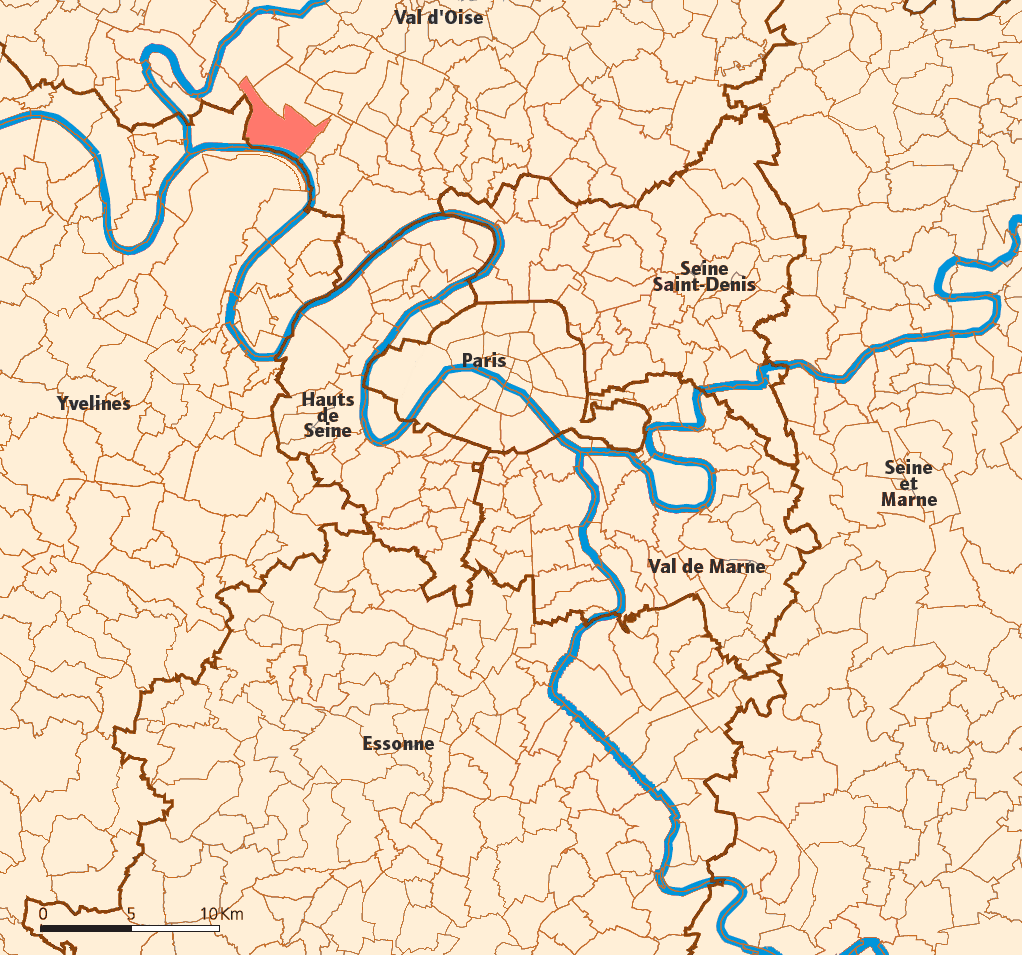
- Location (in red) within Paris inner and outer suburbs
- Location of Herblay-sur-Seine
- Location within France Location within Île-de-France (region)
- Coordinates: 48°59′27″N 2°09′59″E
- Country: France
- Region: Île-de-France
- Department: Val-d'Oise
- Arrondissement: Argenteuil
- Canton: Herblay-sur-Seine
- Intercommunality: CA Val Parisis

Government
  - Mayor (2020–2026): Philippe Rouleau (LR)
- Area^{1}: 12.74 km^{2} (4.92 sq mi)
- Highest elevation: 91 m (299 ft)
- Lowest elevation: 20 m (66 ft)
- Population (2023): 31,779
  - Density: 2,494/km^{2} (6,461/sq mi)
- Demonym: Herblaysiens
- Time zone: UTC+01:00 (CET)
  - Summer (DST): UTC+02:00 (CEST)
- INSEE/Postal code: 95306 /95220
- Website: www.herblaysurseine.fr
- ^{1} French Land Register data, which excludes lakes, ponds, glaciers > 1 km^{2} (0.386 sq mi or 247 acres) and river estuaries.

Herblay-sur-Seine (French pronunciation: [ɛʁblɛ syʁ sɛn]; lit. 'Herblay-on-Seine'; before 2018: Herblay) is a commune in the Val-d'Oise department in the Île-de-France region in Northern France. It is located 20.2 km (12.6 mi) from the centre of Paris, in its northwestern outer suburbs, on the departmental border with Yvelines. It is twinned with Yeovil, England.

== Geography ==
=== Climate ===
Herblay-sur-Seine has an oceanic climate (Köppen climate classification Cfb). The average annual temperature in Herblay-sur-Seine is 11.8 °C (53.2 °F). The average annual rainfall is 612.5 mm (24.11 in) with October as the wettest month. The temperatures are highest on average in July, at around 19.7 °C (67.5 °F), and lowest in December, at around 4.6 °C (40.3 °F). The highest temperature ever recorded in Herblay-sur-Seine was 40.1 °C (104.2 °F) on 6 August 2003; the coldest temperature ever recorded was −13.5 °C (7.7 °F) on 7 January 2009.

Climate data for Herblay-sur-Seine (1981−2010 normals, extremes 1989−2014)
| Month | Jan | Feb | Mar | Apr | May | Jun | Jul | Aug | Sep | Oct | Nov | Dec | Year |
|---|---|---|---|---|---|---|---|---|---|---|---|---|---|
| Record high °C (°F) | 16.0 (60.8) | 20.5 (68.9) | 24.6 (76.3) | 27.0 (80.6) | 32.5 (90.5) | 36.8 (98.2) | 37.2 (99.0) | 40.1 (104.2) | 32.5 (90.5) | 29.4 (84.9) | 19.0 (66.2) | 17.7 (63.9) | 40.1 (104.2) |
| Mean daily maximum °C (°F) | 7.2 (45.0) | 8.8 (47.8) | 12.8 (55.0) | 15.4 (59.7) | 19.8 (67.6) | 22.7 (72.9) | 25.1 (77.2) | 25.1 (77.2) | 21.2 (70.2) | 16.1 (61.0) | 10.7 (51.3) | 7.0 (44.6) | 16.0 (60.8) |
| Daily mean °C (°F) | 4.6 (40.3) | 5.5 (41.9) | 8.6 (47.5) | 10.6 (51.1) | 14.6 (58.3) | 17.4 (63.3) | 19.7 (67.5) | 19.6 (67.3) | 16.1 (61.0) | 12.4 (54.3) | 7.7 (45.9) | 4.6 (40.3) | 11.8 (53.2) |
| Mean daily minimum °C (°F) | 2.1 (35.8) | 2.2 (36.0) | 4.3 (39.7) | 5.8 (42.4) | 9.5 (49.1) | 12.2 (54.0) | 14.2 (57.6) | 14.1 (57.4) | 11.1 (52.0) | 8.5 (47.3) | 4.7 (40.5) | 2.1 (35.8) | 7.6 (45.7) |
| Record low °C (°F) | −13.5 (7.7) | −12.8 (9.0) | −9.7 (14.5) | −3.0 (26.6) | 0.3 (32.5) | 2.1 (35.8) | 5.9 (42.6) | 5.2 (41.4) | 2.3 (36.1) | −3.5 (25.7) | −9.9 (14.2) | −11.6 (11.1) | −13.5 (7.7) |
| Average precipitation mm (inches) | 45.3 (1.78) | 44.2 (1.74) | 45.2 (1.78) | 50.7 (2.00) | 53.2 (2.09) | 51.8 (2.04) | 54.6 (2.15) | 51.7 (2.04) | 42.8 (1.69) | 61.3 (2.41) | 51.4 (2.02) | 60.3 (2.37) | 612.5 (24.11) |
| Average precipitation days (≥ 1.0 mm) | 9.0 | 9.3 | 9.9 | 10.0 | 9.0 | 8.6 | 7.9 | 8.1 | 8.1 | 9.6 | 10.8 | 11.1 | 111.0 |
Source: Météo-France

== Demographics ==
Historical population

| Year | Pop. | ±% p.a. |
|---|---|---|
| 1793 | 1,524 | — |
| 1800 | 1,364 | −1.57% |
| 1806 | 1,377 | +0.16% |
| 1821 | 1,396 | +0.09% |
| 1831 | 1,564 | +1.14% |
| 1836 | 1,576 | +0.15% |
| 1841 | 1,574 | −0.03% |
| 1846 | 1,605 | +0.39% |
| 1851 | 1,582 | −0.29% |
| 1856 | 1,592 | +0.13% |
| 1861 | 1,641 | +0.61% |
| 1866 | 1,611 | −0.37% |
| 1872 | 1,699 | +0.89% |
| 1876 | 1,631 | −1.02% |
| 1881 | 1,625 | −0.07% |
| 1886 | 1,681 | +0.68% |
| 1891 | 1,798 | +1.35% |
| 1896 | 2,033 | +2.49% |
| 1901 | 1,990 | −0.43% |

| Year | Pop. | ±% p.a. |
|---|---|---|
| 1906 | 2,190 | +1.93% |
| 1911 | 2,339 | +1.33% |
| 1921 | 2,898 | +2.17% |
| 1926 | 4,258 | +8.00% |
| 1931 | 5,471 | +5.14% |
| 1936 | 5,800 | +1.17% |
| 1946 | 5,937 | +0.23% |
| 1954 | 7,452 | +2.88% |
| 1962 | 10,220 | +4.03% |
| 1968 | 12,264 | +3.09% |
| 1975 | 16,397 | +4.24% |
| 1982 | 19,647 | +2.62% |
| 1990 | 22,135 | +1.50% |
| 1999 | 23,083 | +0.47% |
| 2007 | 26,137 | +1.57% |
| 2012 | 26,944 | +0.61% |
| 2017 | 29,342 | +1.72% |
| 2023 | 31,779 | +1.34% |

Source: EHESS and INSEE (1968–2023)

== Transport ==
Herblay-sur-Seine is served by Herblay station on the Transilien Paris-Saint-Lazare suburban rail line.

== Education ==
Schools in Herblay-sur-Seine:

- Six primary school : Jean-Louis Etienne, Jean Moulin, Buttes Blanches, Chênes, Tournade, Saint-Exupéry
- Seven public preschools (maternelles): Jean Moulin, Buttes Blanches, Chênes, Tournade, Saint-Exupéry, Louis Pergaud, Jean Jaurès
- Seven public elementary schools: Jean Moulin, Pasteur, Buttes Blanches, Chênes, Saint Exupéry, Marie Curie, Jean Jaurès
- Two public junior high schools (collèges): Georges Duhamel and Jean Vilar
- Lycée Montesquieu (public senior high school/sixth-form college)
- Three private schools: Sainte Jeanne d'Arc, Montaigne, Léonard de Vinci

The commune has a municipal library.

== People from Herblay ==
See Category:People from Herblay

- Pierre Pincemaille (1956-2018), musician and organist.

== See also ==
- Communes of the Val-d'Oise department
