= La Frette-sur-Seine =

- Commune
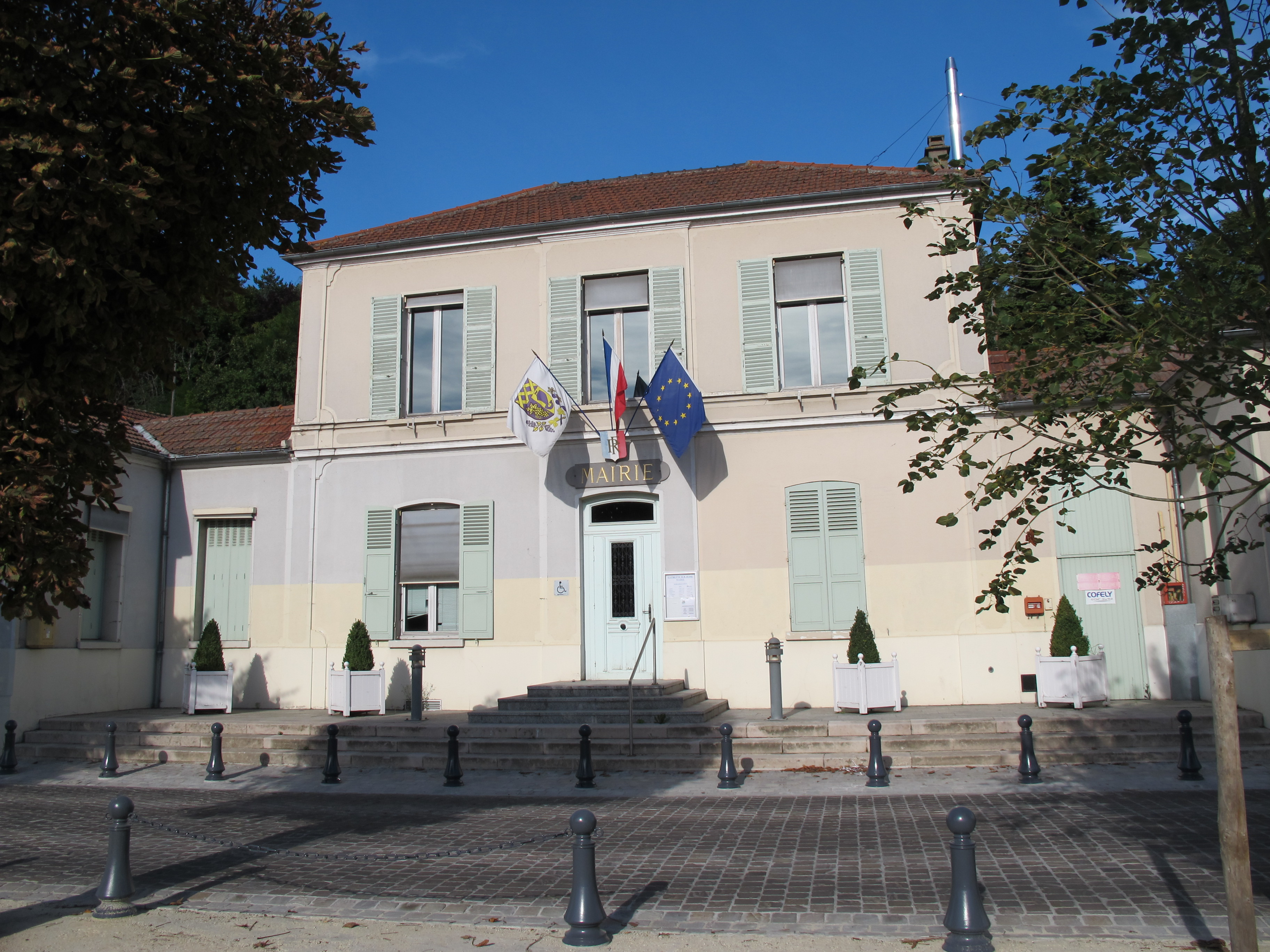
- The town hall of La Frette

- Coat of arms
- Location of La Frette-sur-Seine
- Location within France Location within Île-de-France (region)
- Coordinates: 48°58′30″N 2°10′46″E
- Country: France
- Region: Île-de-France
- Department: Val-d'Oise
- Arrondissement: Argenteuil
- Canton: Herblay-sur-Seine
- Intercommunality: CA Val Parisis

Government
  - Mayor (2020–2026): Philippe Audebert
- Area^{1}: 2.02 km^{2} (0.78 sq mi)
- Highest elevation: 81 m (266 ft)
- Lowest elevation: 22 m (72 ft)
- Population (2023): 4,570
  - Density: 2,260/km^{2} (5,860/sq mi)
- Time zone: UTC+01:00 (CET)
  - Summer (DST): UTC+02:00 (CEST)
- INSEE/Postal code: 95257 /95530
- ^{1} French Land Register data, which excludes lakes, ponds, glaciers > 1 km^{2} (0.386 sq mi or 247 acres) and river estuaries.

La Frette-sur-Seine (French pronunciation: [la fʁɛt syʁ sɛn], literally La Frette on Seine) is a commune in the Val-d'Oise department in Île-de-France in northern France.

== Population ==
Historical population
Year	Pop.	±% p.a.
1968	3,573	—
1975	3,681	+0.43%
1982	3,829	+0.56%
1990	4,126	+0.94%
1999	4,378	+0.66%
2007	4,520	+0.40%
2012	4,572	+0.23%
2017	4,686	+0.49%
2023	4,570	−0.42%
Source: INSEE

== See also ==
- Communes of the Val-d'Oise department
