= Pierrelaye =

- Commune
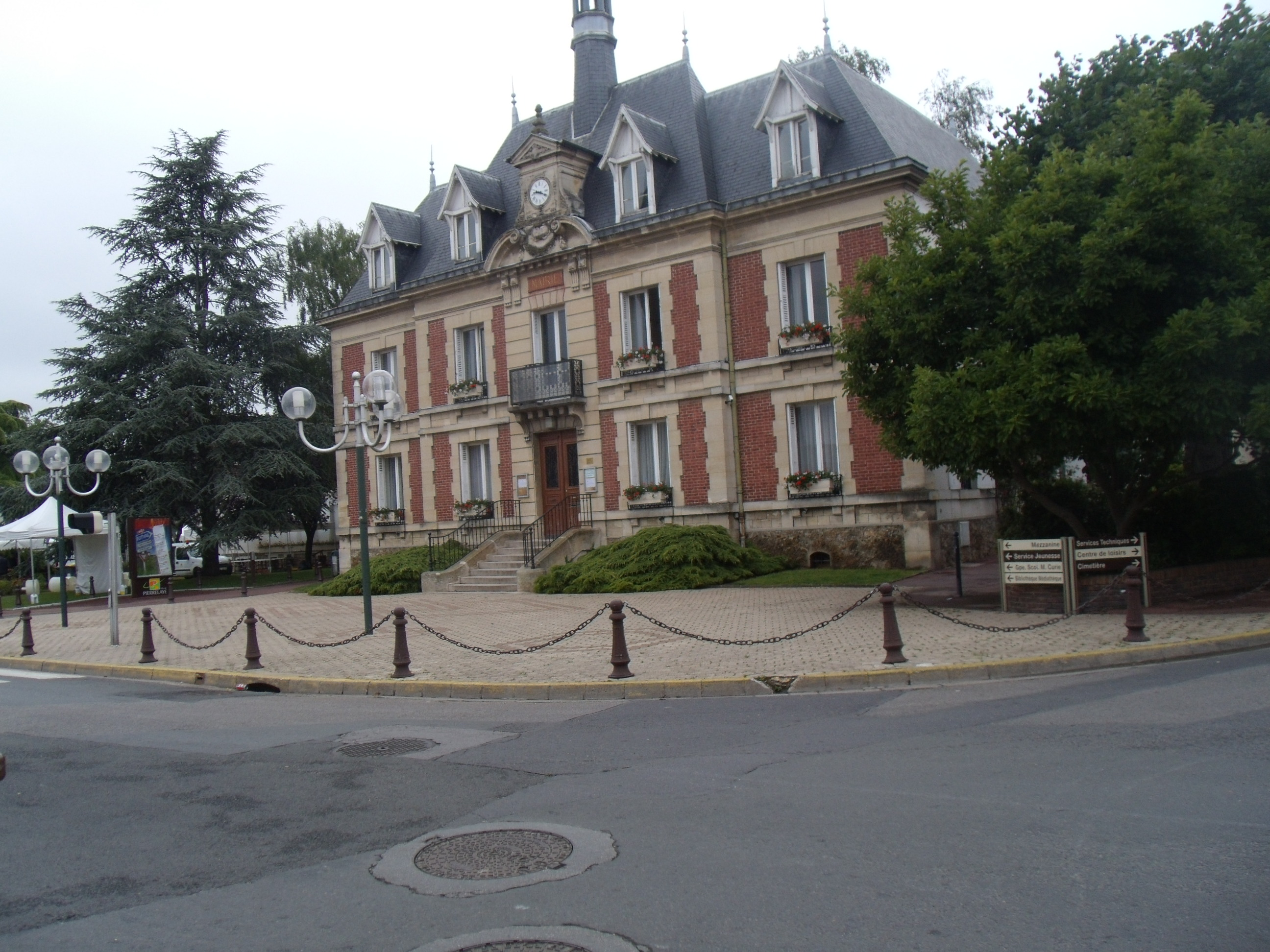
- The town hall of Pierrelaye
- Location of Pierrelaye
- Location within France Location within Île-de-France (region)
- Coordinates: 49°01′24″N 2°09′03″E
- Country: France
- Region: Île-de-France
- Department: Val-d'Oise
- Arrondissement: Argenteuil
- Canton: Taverny
- Intercommunality: CA Val Parisis

Government
  - Mayor (2020–2026): Michel Vallade
- Area^{1}: 9.21 km^{2} (3.56 sq mi)
- Highest elevation: 78 m (256 ft)
- Lowest elevation: 35 m (115 ft)
- Population (2023): 10,130
  - Density: 1,100/km^{2} (2,850/sq mi)
- Time zone: UTC+01:00 (CET)
  - Summer (DST): UTC+02:00 (CEST)
- INSEE/Postal code: 95488 /95480
- ^{1} French Land Register data, which excludes lakes, ponds, glaciers > 1 km^{2} (0.386 sq mi or 247 acres) and river estuaries.

Pierrelaye (French pronunciation: [pjɛʁlɛ]) is a commune in the Val-d'Oise department in Île-de-France in northern France. Pierrelaye station has rail connections to Pontoise and Paris.

== Population ==
Historical population
Year	Pop.	±% p.a.
1968	4,606	—
1975	5,586	+2.79%
1982	5,548	−0.10%
1990	6,251	+1.50%
1999	6,923	+1.14%
2007	7,635	+1.23%
2012	8,218	+1.48%
2017	8,393	+0.42%
2023	10,130	+3.18%
Source: INSEE

== See also ==
- Communes of the Val-d'Oise department
