= Beauchamp, Val-d'Oise =

Beauchamp
- Commune
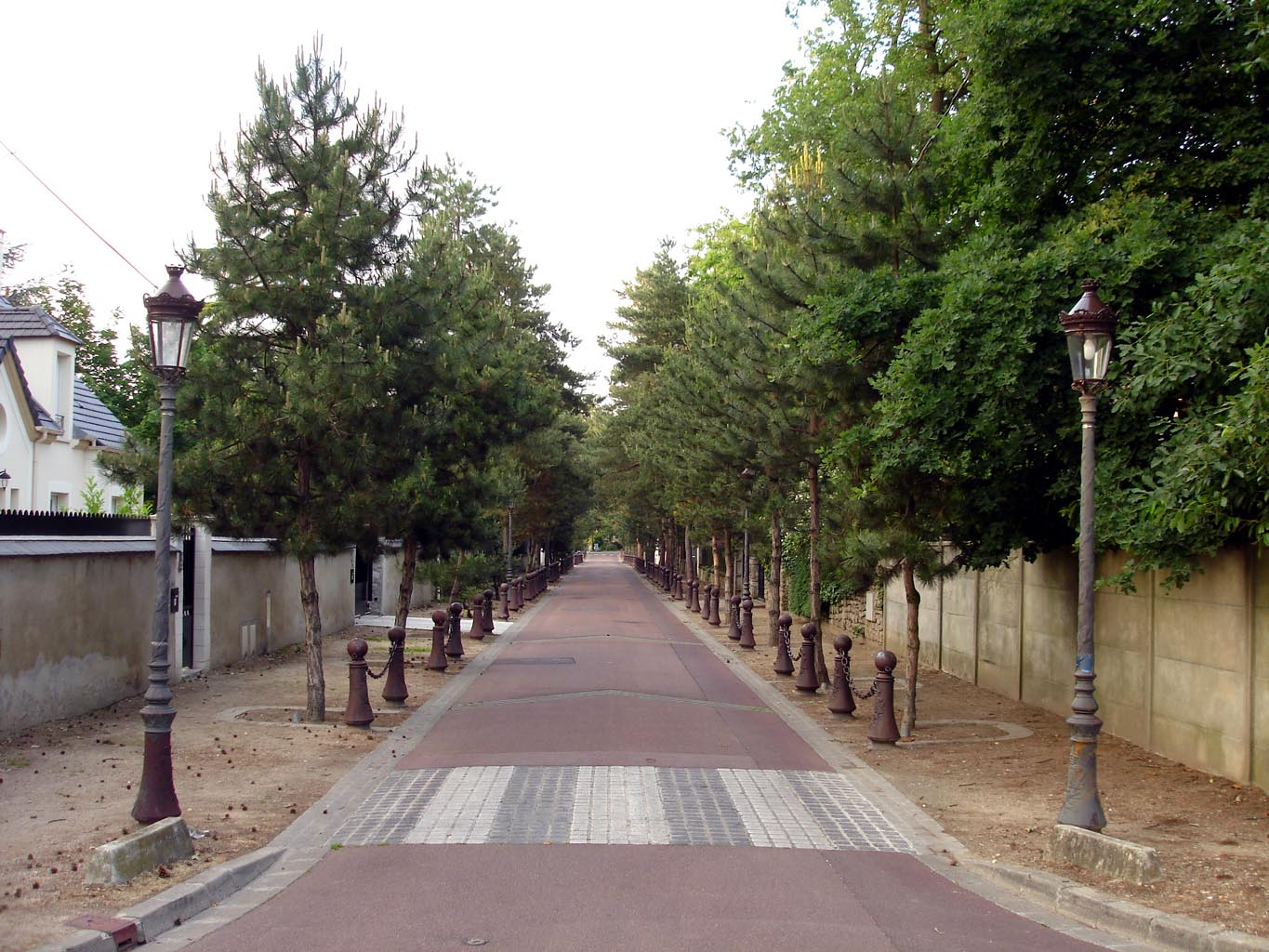
- The Avenue des Sapins, in Beauchamp

- Coat of arms
- Location of Beauchamp
- Location within France Location within Île-de-France (region)
- Coordinates: 49°00′52″N 2°11′26″E
- Country: France
- Region: Île-de-France
- Department: Val-d'Oise
- Arrondissement: Argenteuil
- Canton: Taverny
- Intercommunality: CA Val Parisis

Government
  - Mayor (2020–2026): Françoise Nordmann
- Area^{1}: 3.02 km^{2} (1.17 sq mi)
- Highest elevation: 73 m (240 ft)
- Lowest elevation: 47 m (154 ft)
- Population (2023): 9,849
  - Density: 3,260/km^{2} (8,450/sq mi)
- Time zone: UTC+01:00 (CET)
  - Summer (DST): UTC+02:00 (CEST)
- INSEE/Postal code: 95051 /95250
- ^{1} French Land Register data, which excludes lakes, ponds, glaciers > 1 km^{2} (0.386 sq mi or 247 acres) and river estuaries.

Beauchamp (French pronunciation: [boʃɑ̃]) is a commune in the Val-d'Oise department in Île-de-France in northern France.

== Population ==
Historical population
Year	Pop.	±% p.a.
1968	6,324	—
1975	7,798	+3.04%
1982	8,319	+0.93%
1990	8,934	+0.90%
1999	8,986	+0.06%
2007	8,843	−0.20%
2012	8,753	−0.20%
2017	8,683	−0.16%
2023	9,849	+2.12%
Source: INSEE

== See also ==
- Communes of the Val-d'Oise department
