= Grade I listed buildings in Pembrokeshire =

Pembrokeshire shown within Wales

This is a list of Grade I-listed buildings in the county of Pembrokeshire, Wales.

In the United Kingdom, the term listed building refers to a building or other structure officially designated as being of special architectural, historical, or cultural significance; Grade I structures are those considered to be "buildings of exceptional interest". Listing was begun by a provision in the Town and Country Planning Act 1947. Once listed, strict limitations are imposed on the modifications allowed to a building's structure or fittings. In Wales, the authority for listing under the Planning (Listed Buildings and Conservation Areas) Act 1990 rests with Cadw.

== Buildings ==
Name	Location Grid Ref. (Note: Sometimes known as OSGB36, the grid reference is based on the British national grid reference system used by the Ordnance Survey.) Geo-coordinates	Date Listed	Function	Notes	Reference Number	Image
Pele Tower	Angle; SM8660702994; 51°41′06″N 5°05′18″W	14 May 1970	Pele tower	About 100 m N of St Mary's Church, close to Castle Farm.	5923	See more images
Caldey Priory	Tenby; SS1408596316; 51°38′05″N 4°41′16″W	14 May 1970	Priory	Situated some 300m S of the Abbey, on the W side of the road to the lighthouse.	5932	See more images
Carew Castle	Carew; SN0450003769; 51°41′55″N 4°49′49″W	14 May 1970	Castle	At the W of Carew Castle, 600 m N of the A477	5937	See more images
Carew Cross	Carew; SN0467603708; 51°41′53″N 4°49′40″W	14 May 1970	Cross	In Carew village, in a small roadside enclosure taken from Castle Green opposite the Carew Inn.	5938	See more images
Old Mortuary Chapel	Carew; SN0453302831; 51°41′24″N 4°49′46″W	14 May 1970	Chapel	In St Mary's Churchyard, about 30m NW of the Church.	5945	See more images
St Michael's Church	Castlemartin; SR9106098880; 51°38′59″N 5°01′18″W	14 May 1970	Church	In a lane NW of Castlemartin village.	5948	See more images
St James's Church	Manorbier; SS0650197645; 51°38′39″N 4°47′53″W	14 May 1970	Church	Dating from the 12th century, the church was granted to Monkton Priory by Sir John de Barri in 1301. Following the Dissolution it became the Parish Church in Manorbier.	5975	See more images
Manorbier Castle	Manorbier; SS0639597793; 51°38′44″N 4°47′59″W	14 May 1970	Castle	Prominently sited at the S end of Manorbier village this early medieval castle was owned by the de Barri family.	5976	See more images
Lydstep Palace	Manorbier; SS0863098375; 51°39′05″N 4°46′04″W	14 May 1970	Bishop's palace	At N of the A4139 in the centre of Lydstep Village, immediately opposite to Lydstep Tavern.	5991	See more images
St Mary's Church	Carew; SN0456902804; 51°41′23″N 4°49′44″W	14 May 1970	Church	In Carew Cheriton, 300m S of the A477.	6007	See more images
St Elidyr's Church	Stackpole Elidor, Stackpole and Castlemartin; SR9872597303; 51°38′18″N 4°54′36″W	14 May 1970	Church	Mediaeval church in the hamlet of Cheriton (or Stackpole Elidor) dating to the 12th century or earlier, with restoration by George Gilbert Scott in 1851.	6020	See more images
Upton Chapel	Cosheston; SN0209104699; 51°42′22″N 4°51′57″W	14 May 1970	Chapel	A small chapel in close proximity to Upton Castle. It is reached by a private path from the Castle.	6032	See more images
Amroth Castle	Amroth; SN1697007241; 51°44′02″N 4°39′07″W	4 December 1951	Country House	At the N side of the unclassified coast road about ? km E of the village of Amroth. A high wall screens the castle grounds from the road, with an entrance archway at the SW corner. A tree-lined drive leads to the Castle.	6041	See more images
Picton Castle	Slebech; SN0107613430; 51°47′03″N 4°53′07″W	21 June 1971	Castle	2 km S of the A40(T) road, in extensive private grounds overlooking the Daugleddau confluence.	6043	See more images
Llawhaden Castle	Llawhaden; SN0730317465; 51°49′21″N 4°47′51″W	21 June 1971	Castle	To the W of Llawhaden Village, standing within a wide dry moat, at the head of a steep slope above the Eastern Cleddau.	6065	See more images
St Mary's Church	Tenby; SN1342400447; 51°40′18″N 4°41′59″W	19 March 1951	Church	In a prominent position on the SW side of the High Street just NW of Tudor Square.	6177	See more images
Tudor Merchant's House	Tenby; SN1353000440; 51°40′18″N 4°41′53″W	19 March 1951	House	Situated on the W side of Quay Hill facing down Bridge Street.	6226	See more images
Pembroke Castle	Pembroke; SM9816401620; 51°40′37″N 4°55′15″W	2 October 1951	Castle	Situated prominently at the high W end of the ridge on which the old town of Pembroke is built.	6314	See more images
St Nicholas' Church	Monkton, Pembroke; SM9796201451; 51°40′31″N 4°55′25″W	2 October 1951	Church	In a prominent position in Monkton approximately 200m SW of Pembroke Castle. Now parish church known as St Nicholas & St John, Monkton.	6330	See more images
Monkton Old Hall	Monkton, Pembroke; SM9805401432; 51°40′31″N 4°55′20″W	2 October 1951	Hall	On the N side of Church Terrace in Monkton some 60m E of the Priory Church of Saint Nicholas.	6332	See more images
St Mary's Church	Pembroke; SM9835801540; 51°40′35″N 4°55′04″W	2 October 1951	Church	In a prominent position on the N side of Main Street just E of its junction with Northgate Street.	6400	See more images
St Daniel's Church	Pembroke; SM9821200476; 51°40′00″N 4°55′10″W	2 October 1951		In a prominent position on a hill some 1.1km S of Pembroke Castle.	6453	See more images
Narberth Castle	Narberth; SN1097814392; 51°47′46″N 4°44′33″W	25 September 1951	Castle	Built soon after 1257, and rebuilt after being burnt in 1299, the castle overlooks the valley and river crossing on the southern approaches to the town	6473	See more images
St Decuman's Church	Rhoscrowther, Hundleton; SM9039502204; 51°40′46″N 5°02′00″W	14 May 1970	Church	Medieval parish church situated in the centre of the village, with 19th and early 20th century restorations.	6591	See more images
Eastington Manor Tower	Rhoscrowther, Hundleton; SM9009702512; 51°40′55″N 5°02′16″W	14 May 1970	Farmhouse	Medieval tower house situated 0.75 km NW of Rhoscrowther Church.	6594	See more images
Ffynone House	Manordeifi; SN2422338605; 52°01′05″N 4°33′47″W	16 January 1952	Country House	Country house designed by John Nash, 1792-9 situated 1.5km SE of Newchapel, overlooking Dulas valley. Repaired by W Hoare and Son in 1828 and remodelled by F Inigo Thomas 1902-7.	11980	See more images
Ffynone House Stables and Kitchen Court	Manordeifi; SN2426738641; 52°01′06″N 4°33′45″W	16 January 1952	House	Part of the Ffynone estate. The narrow kitchen court is to the immediate East of the house and the larger stable court lies beyond on the North ridge.	15122	Upload Photo
Roch Castle	Roch, Nolton and Roch; SM8802921212; 51°50′57″N 5°04′44″W	13 December 1951	Castle	Situated in centre of Roch village, on a rocky knoll visible from considerable distances.	11982	See more images
St Michael's Church	Rudbaxton; SM9602720561; 51°50′47″N 4°57′46″W	1 March 1963	Church	Situated some 600m E of the A40 in the centre of Rudbaxton just NW of Great Rudbaxton.	12009	See more images
Haverfordwest Castle	Haverfordwest; SM9534315728; 51°48′09″N 4°58′11″W	12 October 1951	Castle	Situated on hill in centre of the town.	12031	See more images
St Mary's Church	Haverfordwest; SM9519115569; 51°48′04″N 4°58′19″W	12 October 1951	Church	Situated at the head of the High Street.	12226	See more images
Haverfordwest Priory	Haverfordwest; SM9569115219; 51°47′53″N 4°57′52″W	1 July 1974	Priory (ruined)	Situated on the riverside at the end of Quay Street.	12240	See more images
St Davids Cathedral	St David's and the Cathedral Close; SM7515625430; 51°52′55″N 5°16′06″W	1 March 1963	Cathedral	The principal cathedral of Wales is built on the site of the monastery founded by Saint David c.520. The present building was built mainly between 1180 and 1220 with numerous additions and restorations.	12537	See more images
St David's Cathedral Hall	St David's and the Cathedral Close; SM7514425474; 51°52′56″N 5°16′07″W	13 December 1951	Chapel	Founded 1365 by John of Gaunt and Bishop Adam Houghton, the former chapel of College of Saint Mary is situated on N side of former cathedral cloister, N of cathedral nave.	12538	See more images
Porth-y-Tŵr	St Davids and the Cathedral Close; SM7520425363; 51°52′53″N 5°16′03″W	1 March 1963	Gateway	Large 14th century two-stage octagonal bell-tower and attached gate situated at entrance to The Cathedral Close from The Pebbles and restored in 1929 by W D Caroe.	12541	See more images
Cloister Hall	St David's and the Cathedral Close; SM7517825487; 51°52′57″N 5°16′05″W	1 March 1963	Cloister hall	Situated to N of cathedral in walled enclosure on E side of River Alun, approached by unmetalled track from Treasurer's House.	12553	Cloister Hall
Outbuilding to the north of the Cloister Hall	St David's and the Cathedral Close; SM7518525499; 51°52′57″N 5°16′05″W	1 March 1963	Outbuilding	Situated to N of cathedral in walled enclosure on E side of River Alun, approached by unmetalled track from Treasurer's House.	12554	Upload Photo
Undercrofts of the former St Mary's College, beneath and to the rear of the Cloister Hall	St David's and the Cathedral Close; SM7516125496; 51°52′57″N 5°16′06″W	1 March 1963	Undercroft	Situated to N of cathedral in walled enclosure on E side of River Alun, approached by unmetalled track from Treasurer's House.	12555	Upload Photo
Enclosing wall and gateway on the north side of the rear yard of the Cloister Hall	St David's and the Cathedral Close; SM7515925507; 51°52′57″N 5°16′06″W	1 March 1963	Wall/Gateway	Situated to N of cathedral in walled enclosure on E side of River Alun, approached by unmetalled track from Treasurer's House.	12556	Upload Photo
Bishop's Palace	St David's and the Cathedral Close; SM7502825469; 51°52′56″N 5°16′13″W	1 March 1963	Bishop's palace	Situated W of the Cathedral on the opposite bank of the River Alun.	12558	See more images
St Justinian's Chapel	St Justinian's; SM7231525240; 51°52′45″N 5°18′34″W	1 March 1963	Chapel (ruined)	Ruined early 16th century chapel reputedly the burial place of St Justinian.	12692	See more images
St David's Church	Hubberston, Milford Haven; SM8906806233; 51°42′54″N 5°03′17″W	17 July 1951	Church	Situated in churchyard behind C20 shops in Gelleswick Road.	12925	See more images
Newport Castle	Newport; SN0570838870; 52°00′51″N 4°49′58″W	16 January 1952	Castle	Anglo-Norman castle situated prominently overlooking town. In 1859 the major surviving part, the gatehouse, was incorporated into a house.	13083	See more images
St Dogmaels Abbey	St Dogmaels (part); SN1640445855; 52°04′50″N 4°40′51″W	15 November 1993	Abbey (ruined)	Ruins of medieval abbey of the Order of Tiron situated to the South of the parish church.	13102	See more images
Paterchurch Tower	Pembroke Dock; SM9576303558; 51°41′37″N 4°57′23″W	14 July 1981	Tower	This medieval tower stood outside the dockyard walls prior to realignment of the walls in 1844.	14341	See more images
Cilgerran Castle	Cilgerran; SN1949843135; 52°03′26″N 4°38′03″W	15 April 1994	Castle	13th century castle situated on a bluff where the Afon Plysgog joins the River Teifi.	14491	See more images
West Tarr Mediaeval House	Penally; SN0889600800; 51°40′24″N 4°45′55″W	26 April 1996	House	At the rear of West Tarr farmhouse, 0.5 km SE of St Florence village.	16920	Upload Photo
Whitewell Ruins: Structure A	Penally; SS0948499060; 51°39′29″N 4°45′21″W	14 May 1970	Manor house (ruined)	At the N side of the A4139 about 1 km E of Lydstep. The ruins are situated at the S of a caravan park behind Whitewell Farm.	6004	Upload Photo
Whitewell Ruins: Structure B	Penally; SS0948999035; 51°39′28″N 4°45′21″W	26 April 1996	Ruin	At the N side of the A4139 about 1 km E of Lydstep. The ruins are situated at the S of a caravan park behind Whitewell Farm.	16922	Upload Photo
Whitewell Ruins: Structure C	Penally; SS0947299053; 51°39′28″N 4°45′21″W	26 April 1996	Ruin	At the N side of the A4139 about 1 km E of Lydstep. The ruins are situated at the S of a caravan park behind Whitewell Farm.	16923	Upload Photo
Sailors' Chapel	Angle; SM8663902926; 51°41′04″N 5°05′17″W	14 May 1970	Chapel	At N side of St Mary's Church, within the Churchyard.	17147	See more images
Lamphey Bishop's Palace	Lamphey; SN0185000895; 51°40′18″N 4°52′01″W	14 May 1970	Bishop's palace	Reached by minor road at N of Lamphey village.	17393	See more images
St Govan's Chapel	Stackpole, Stackpole and Castlemartin; SR9670592962; 51°35′55″N 4°56′12″W	8 February 1996	Chapel	Early mediaeval chapel built where Saint Govan was believed to have hidden from pirates. The chapel and its well became a pilgrimage site with a reputation for the miraculous cure of lameness and eye-disease.	17980	See more images
Tenby Town Walls	Tenby; SN1334600380; 51°40′16″N 4°42′03″W	28 March 2002	Town walls	The walls run W along White Lion Street from corner of Upper Frog St, and then S along South Parade and St Florence Parade to the sea.	26434	See more images
Wiston Castle	Wiston; SN0226118180; 51°49′38″N 4°52′15″W	16 June 2004	Castle	In a prominent position near the centre of Wiston some 200m N of the Church of Saint Mary.	82851	See more images

== See also ==
- Grade II* listed buildings in Pembrokeshire
- Listed buildings in Wales
- Scheduled monuments in Pembrokeshire
- Registered historic parks and gardens in Pembrokeshire
