= Eastington Manor Tower =

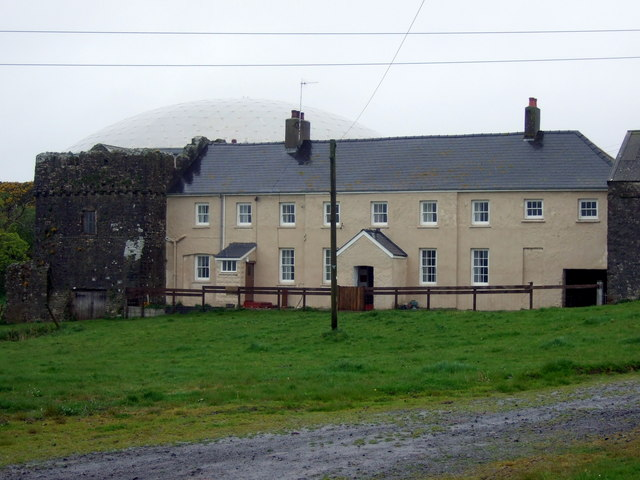
- Tower to the left with attached farmhouse range, a dome of the Pembroke Refinery is visible immediately behind the tower

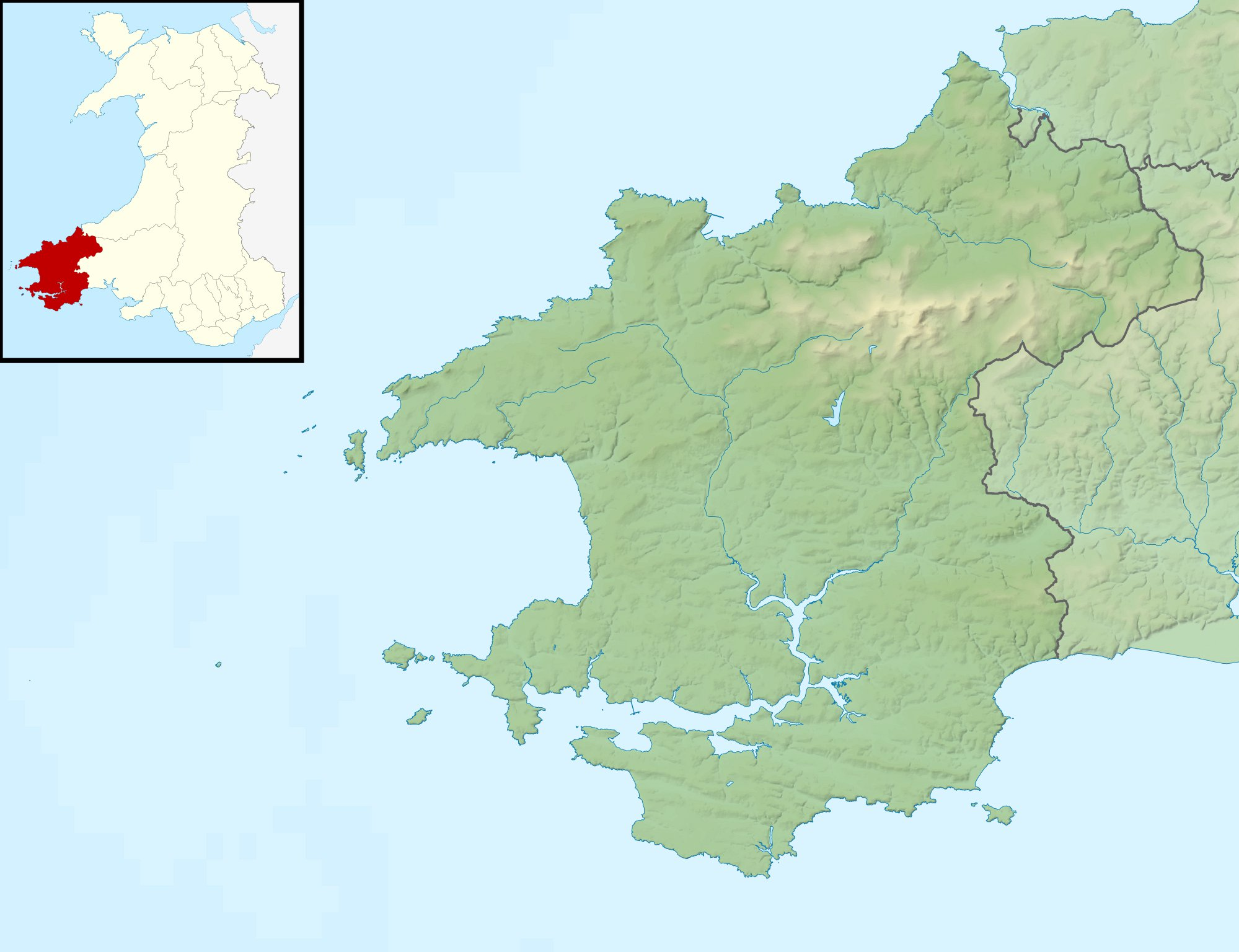
- Location within Pembrokeshire
- 51.682°N 5.0377°W
- Type: Tower House
- Location: Rhoscrowther, Pembrokeshire

History
- Built: 14th or 15th centuries

Site notes
- Architectural style: Mediaeval
- Governing body: Cadw

Listed Building – Grade I
- Official name: Tower at Eastington Manor
- Designated: 14 May 1970
- Reference no.: 6594

Scheduled monument
- Official name: Eastington Manor House
- Designated: 31 October 1951
- Reference no.: PE263

Listed Building – Grade II
- Official name: Eastington Farmhouse including range of outbuildings to south east
- Designated: 29 September 1993
- Reference no.: 6595

The Tower at Eastington Manor is a historic site south of the village of Rhoscrowther, in the community of Angle, Pembrokeshire, Wales. The tower is to a tower house plan and dates from the 14th or 15th centuries. A range of later buildings is attached. The tower is a Grade I listed building and a Scheduled monument. The range is listed at Grade II.

== History and description ==
In their Pembrokeshire volume in the Buildings of Wales series, Thomas Lloyd, Julian Orbach and Robert Scourfield describe Rhoscrowther as a "strange and unhappy village". Almost the whole village was acquired by Pembroke Refinery after an explosion and fire in the 1990s, and was largely evacuated. Eastington Tower stands next to the refinery. The Royal Commission on the Ancient and Historical Monuments of Wales describes it as of the pele tower type, dating either from the 14th or 15th centuries. Cadw suggests the 14th or early 15th centuries. The tower clearly had a defensive purpose. In a paper for the Pembrokeshire Historical Society Gerralt Nash considered another such medieval house identified in Haverfordwest and, noting similar types of near-coastal fortified dwellings in the vicinity such as Carswell Medieval House, West Tarr Mediaeval House and Whitewell Ruins, suggests that the defensive nature of such structures was a response to piracy. (Note: The Haverfordwest house has been reconstructed at the St Fagans National Museum of History.) Lloyd, Orbach and Scourfield suggest that the greater prevalence of such structures in the richer south of the county, particularly in locations proximate to the coast, indicated a need for the inhabitants to protect themselves from pirates making excursions along the navigable rivers.

The medieval house was owned by a branch of the Perrot family of Haverfordwest and later by the Meares and the Leaches. In the 18th century the Meares built a large mansion adjacent to the tower, but this was demolished in 1868. Cadw suggests that the farm range which remains may have been the service wing to this larger house. The layout of the mansion's gardens can still be seen, including a ha ha.

The tower consists of a vaulted undercroft with a chamber above. The rooms were connected with an external stair. The roof is castellated. The construction material is mainly rubble stone. The west wall of the tower has marks indicating the presence of an additional gabled structure which is now gone. Lloyd, Orbach and Scourfield posit two alternatives; either the gabled block was subsequently added to the tower, or that the tower itself was the cross-wing to a larger medieval hall. Eastington Manor Tower is a Grade I listed building and a Scheduled monument. The ancillary building is listed at Grade II.

== See also ==
- Carswell Medieval House
- West Tarr Mediaeval House
- Whitewell Ruins

== Sources ==
- Lloyd, Thomas; Orbach, Julian; Scourfield, Robert (2004). Pembrokeshire. Buildings of Wales. New Haven, US and London: Yale University Press. ISBN 978-0-300-10178-2. OCLC 52946802.
- Nash, Gerralt (2022). "A Tudor Trader's House From Haverfordwest". Journal of the Pembrokeshire Historical Society. Haverfordwest: Pembrokeshire Historical Society.
