= Anna Ryder Richardson =

British interior designer and television presenter

- Born: Anna Caroline Ryder Richardson; 29 January 1964 (age 61); Swansea, Wales
- Known for: Interior design, wildlife conservation and television presenting
- Spouse: Colin MacDougall (m. 2005, separated)
- Children: 2

Anna Caroline Ryder Richardson (born 29 January 1964) is a British interior designer and television presenter. She is known for being a designer on the BBC shows Changing Rooms and the subject of Chaos at the Zoo, which documents her ownership of Manor House Wildlife Park in Pembrokeshire. She also appeared on CBBC show Hider in the House alongside Cameron Biswas.

== Personal life ==
Anna Ryder Richardson was born in Swansea in 1964. Her father was a Malaysian student, and her mother English. At six weeks of age, she was adopted by Colin and Jill Ryder Richardson, and raised in Surrey with her adopted sister Sarah. Her adoptive father was a World War II evacuee who survived the sinking of the SS City of Benares by a German U-boat; he spent his career as a Lloyd's underwriter. She was introduced to her partner, restaurateur Colin MacDougall, by Gregg Wallace at his restaurant on New Year's Eve 2000, and they married at a private ceremony in the Canadian Rockies. Their first child, Bean, was born prematurely and died less than 60 minutes after birth.

== Interior design ==
After an early career in modelling, Ryder Richardson became a fitness instructor. She managed children's interior shop Squidgy Things, where she started designing and decorating children's bedrooms; this work launched her career as an interior designer. She describes her own style as evolving, but "[preferring] the bolder colours". She cites Kelly Hoppen among her influences.

Her breakthrough moment was on a design segment on GMTV in 1996, after which Ainsley Harriott introduced her to the producers of short-lived documentary show Change That. She was cast as one of the interior designers on Changing Rooms where she sprang to fame for her bold interior design choices. She worked on a number of smaller shows, including House Invaders, Staying Put and Trading Spaces. None of these had the same mainstream success as Changing Rooms, and in 2006, reconsidered the direction of her career.

In 2017, it was announced that she would return to interior design, appearing as a designer on Peter Andre's 60 Minute Makeover.

== Wildlife park ==
Ryder Richardson appeared in a string of reality TV shows to fund a lifetime ambition of owning a zoo. She appeared on the BBC Sport Relief event Only Fools on Horses, and the 2007 series of I'm a Celebrity... Get Me Out of Here! (where she was the sixth person to leave). She said she was "unprepared" for these experiences and described her experiences as "unpleasant", but that she developed a good relationship with co-star Christopher Biggins. She would later team up with Biggins on a Celebrity Version of the ITV show Who wants to be a Millionaire?, where they shared a £50,000 prize for their chosen charities.

In 2008, she purchased Manor House Wildlife Park in Pembrokeshire for £1 million. Her experiences at the zoo have been the subject of a number of television series, including Chaos at the Zoo, Anna's Welsh Zoo and Wild Welsh Zoo. She was charged for health and safety violations in 2012, after a mother and son were injured by a falling tree, but acquitted after her husband admitted that work fell under his remit.

In 2015, she set up a charity called 'The Nature Foundation' to transport neglected lionesses from an abandoned zoo in Gyumri to Peak Wildlife Park. She successfully raised £25,000 to transport the animals, but the high-profile nature of the campaign ensured that locals provided adequate facilities for the lionesses in their native Armenia. The funds instead went to breeding facilities for the endangered Sumatran Tiger. As of 2020, she still owns the park.
