= Lydstep =

Coastal settlement in Pembrokeshire, Wales

Coordinates: 51.650556°N 4.767222°W

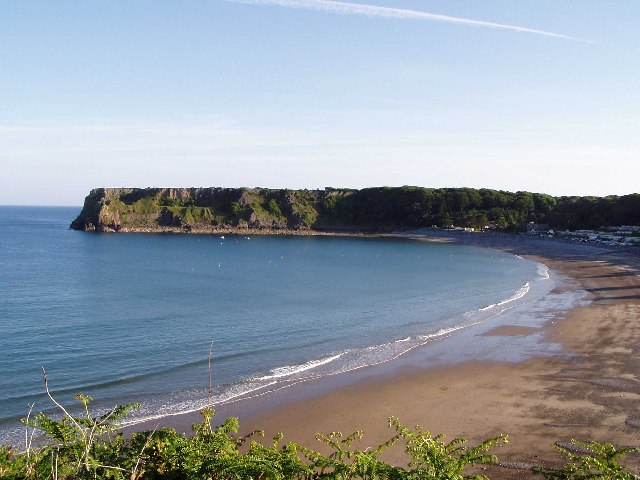
- Lydstep Haven

- Location within Pembrokeshire
- Principal area: Pembrokeshire
- Preserved county: Dyfed
- Country: Wales
- Sovereign state: United Kingdom
- Post town: TENBY
- Postcode district: SA
- Police: Dyfed-Powys
- Fire: Mid and West Wales
- Ambulance: Welsh
- UK Parliament: Mid and South Pembrokeshire
- Senedd Cymru – Welsh Parliament: Carmarthen West and South Pembrokeshire

Lydstep, known in ancient times as Lis Castell, is an area in Pembrokeshire, Wales, in the community of Manorbier. It can be reached via the A4139 from Tenby and Pembroke.

== Ancient history ==
A number of ancient artefacts have been recovered from the submerged forest near Lydstep Haven, while peat deposits are periodically exposed showing human and animal footprints radiocarbon dated to as early as 5,400-4,750 BC.

Lydstep is the location of the royal court of Aergol Lawhir, the semi-legendary king of Dyfed in the mid-fifth century.

His court (Llys in modern Welsh) was notorious for drinking and being unruly which was said to have resulted in frequent murders. As such, Aergol Lawhir sent for the holy saint Teilo, who commissioned two of his disciples to remain at the Llys and maintain order. From that time, no more murders were committed at Lis Castell and in return, Aergol Lawhir granted Teilo the land at Trefgarn.

=== Lydstep Palace ===
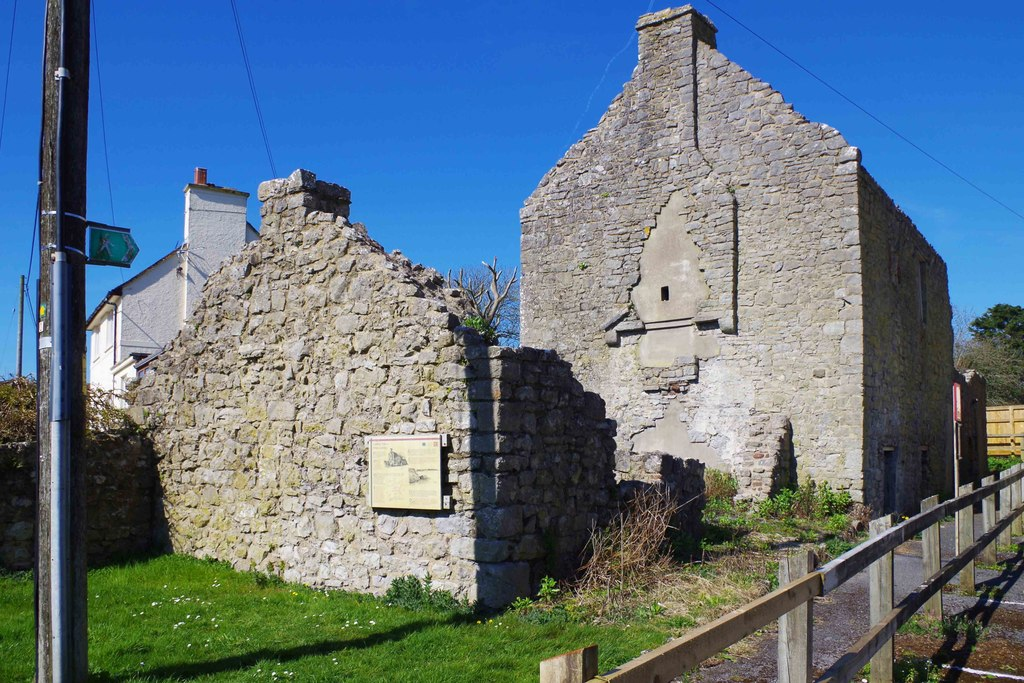
The ruins of Lydstep Palace

The site of Aergol Lawhir's Llys is associated with the later Lydstep Palace, The ruins are of a medieval house referred to locally as "the Palace", or "the Palace of Arms" and are remembered as a hunting-seat of Henry Gower, Bishop of St. Davids. The building was constructed of limestone masonry with slate roof and had a frontage of about 22 yards (20 meters). The ruins consist of a first-floor hall and possible parlour, with a barrel vaulted undercroft in two unequal sections. The vaults were mostly without windows or fireplaces, and were probably used as cellars.
