= Pembrokeshire Action To Combat Hardship =

Charitable organisation in Wales

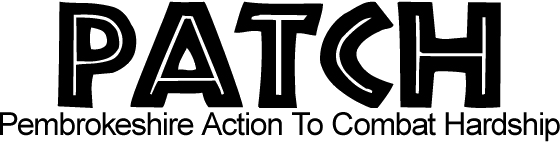
- Formation: June 3, 2008; 18 years ago
- Founder: Tracy Olin
- Founded at: Milford Haven
- Type: Food Bank, Poverty Alleviation
- Purpose: Poverty Alleviation
- Headquarters: Milford Haven
- Location: Milford Haven, Haverfordwest, Pembroke Dock, Tenby
- Region served: Pembrokeshire
- Volunteers: 10+
- Website: http://www.patchcharity.org.uk/
- Formerly called: MATCH (Milford Action To Combat Hardship)

Pembrokeshire Action To Combat Hardship (PATCH), formerly Milford Action To Combat Hardship (MATCH), is a British non-profit charitable organisation, founded in June 2008, that aims to help people who are in a financial crisis. They are based in Milford Haven, Pembrokeshire and have other 'bases' in Pembroke Dock, [Tenby] and Haverfordwest.

It is based on a similar charity in Southampton, SCRATCH.

== Aim ==
PATCH's main aim is to provide short term relief to people who find themselves in a financial crisis, regardless of circumstances. They work on a referral only bases, so only people who are genuinely in need can access their services.

As the name suggests, they currently only operate in the Pembrokeshire area. Although future expansion can not be ruled out based on their past (i.e. Going from just Milford Haven to Pembrokeshire as a whole).

== Projects ==
=== Basics Banks ===
PATCH was first started as a 'basics bank' providing non-perishable food along with clothing a baby bank and household items. The basics bank works on a referral only basis from outside agencies which give vouchers valid for use in the various PATCH basics banks. There are currently three basics banks in Pembrokeshire in Milford Haven, Pembroke Dock and Haverfordwest. However, food parcels are held in churches and other locations around the county in order to enable access to the services for those without transport.

=== Christmas Toy Appeal ===
A PATCH toy appeal has happened annually since 2010, whereby toys and other presents are donated to PATCH who then distribute them to families with children who are referred via outside agencies. The presents are then delivered, during school times, so the children are unaware. In 2013 over 500 children, in over 180 families were given 4-5 'good quality' gifts for each child.

== Support ==
PATCH receives support from numerous local business. The main contributors to the charity include Valero, Lidl and Tesco Milford Haven and Haverfordwest Stores. As well as support from the local media.

In 2014 the charity was named Milford Haven Port Authority/Port of Milford Haven charity of the year and received financial support and other services through the port authority.

== In media ==
Their first major media appearance was on the BBC documentary "The Mount: A Welsh Estate" where they visited the Milford Haven branch. In late 2011 they appeared on Channel 5 news due to a volunteer, Rosalyn Wild, being a finalist in "Britain's Kindest Kid".

In December 2012 PATCH was also a featured in a Christmas edition of the BBC show Songs of Praise.

== Official Visits ==
Along with the local MP's and AM's, PATCH has also had several official visits from members both the cabinet and shadow cabinet from both the Welsh and UK Governments.

In January 2014 the charity visited by Shadow Secretary of State for Wales Owen Smith who said he was 'astonished' by the degree of poverty in Wales.

In the same month it was visited by Jeff Cuthbert the Welsh government minister for Communities and Tackling Poverty in order to see the impact of its support from the Welsh Government's Communities 2.0 programme.

In March 2018, Labour MP Emily Thornberry visited the charity, as part of her visit to the local area.

== Awards ==
Award	Category	Result	Recipient	Source
2010 PAV's Award's	Group award for a group of volunteers working within one organisation (volunteers aged primarily over 25)	Commended	Volunteers aged 25 and over	
2010 PAV's Award's	Youth group award for a group of young volunteers within one organisation (volunteers aged primarily under 25)	Won	Volunteers aged under 25	
2011 PAV's Award's	Group Award for a group of volunteers working within one organisation (volunteers aged primarily under 25)	Highly Commended	Volunteers aged under 25	
2011 PAV's Award's	Youth Group Award for a group of young volunteers within one organisation (volunteers aged primarily over 25)	Highly Commended	Volunteers aged over 25	
2012 PAV's Award's	Youth Group Award for a group of young volunteers within one organisation (volunteers aged primarily under 25)	Won	Volunteers aged under 25	
2013 PAV's Award's	Group Under 25	Won	PATCH Youth Group	
2013 PAV's Award's	Group Over 25	Commended	PATCH	
2014 PAV's Award's	Group Under 25	Won	PATCH	
2014 PAV's Award's	Group Over 25	Won (Joint Winners)	PATCH	
2017 PAV's Award's	Group Under 25	Won	PATCH	

== See also ==
- Charitable organization
- Monkton, Pembroke
- Religion in the United Kingdom
