= Penally Abbey =

Old rectory hotel in Pembrokeshire, Wales

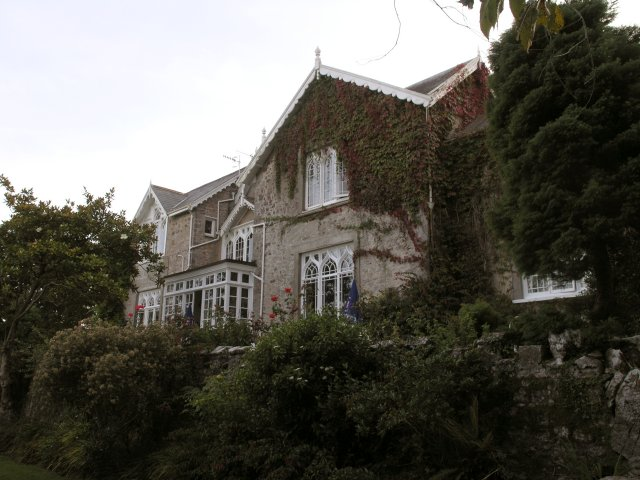

- Location in Pembrokeshire

General information
- Location: Penally, Pembrokeshire, Wales
- Coordinates: 51°39′38″N 4°43′24″W
- Opening: 1985

Other information
- Number of rooms: 11
- Number of suites: 11
- Number of restaurants: 1

Website
- www.penally-abbey.com

Penally Abbey is an old rectory, now the Penally Abbey Country House Hotel and Restaurant overlooking Carmarthen Bay in the village of Penally, about 1.5 miles from Tenby, Pembrokeshire, Wales. It was once owned by the Jameson family of Irish whiskey distillers.

== History ==
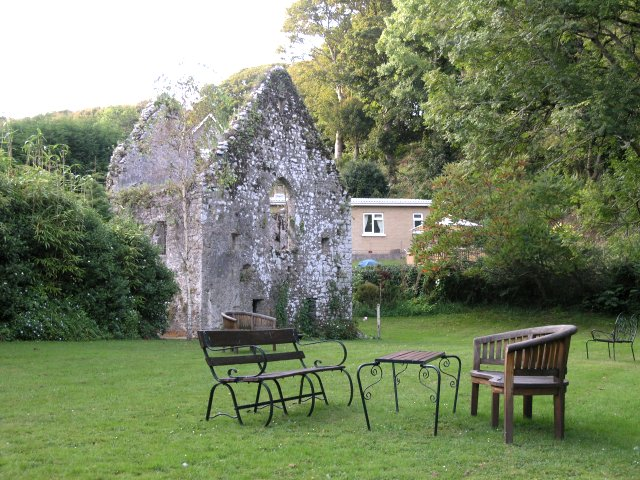
The 12th century ruined Norman church in the grounds

Little remains of the original monastic site except a ruined 12th century chapel in the grounds. It is called St. Deniol's church and has a Flemish chimney.

The monastery at Penally is believed to date back to around the 6th century when St Teilo and several other saints lived here, and it was located along the pilgrims' trail to St David's in North Pembrokeshire. A Celtic Cross created by pilgrims in the 10th century is located in Penally village church.

In 1301, the rectory was occupied by the nuns of Aconbury and for some time it housed eight nuns and their prioress until the dissolution of the monasteries in 1534 when the property and lands were seized by the Church of Wales. The rectors of the church at Penally used the building as their place of residence until the 1820s, when a new vicarage was erected. In the early 1800s the ruined chapel became a fernery and later a Victorian folly.

In the early 20th century, Penally Abbey became a private residence and it was occupied by the famous Jameson's Whiskey family from 1916 until 1925. It then housed numerous military personnel in subsequent decades, becoming a country club briefly in the 1950s. In 1985, the abbey was converted into a hotel.

== Architecture ==
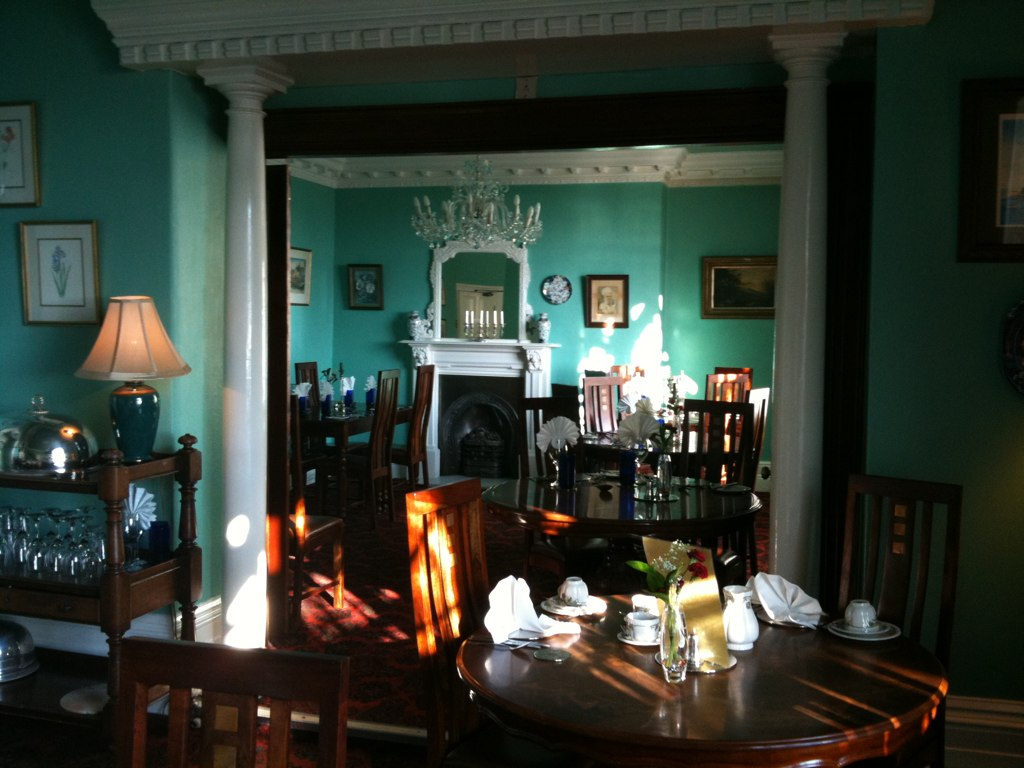
Dining room

Penally Abbey is built from Pembrokeshire limestone and consists of three buildings set in nearly 6 acres. It is noted for its large gothic windows and its ogee-headed doors.
