= Limekilns at Kiln Park, Pembrokeshire =

Coordinates: 51.6684°N 4.7192°W

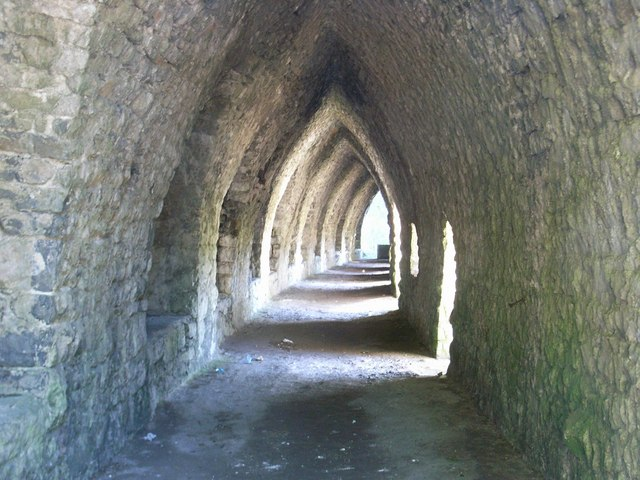
Vaulted interior passageway through the western limekilns

The limekilns at Kiln Park are heritage listed disused limekilns now located in the grounds of a holiday park, Kiln Park, near the village of Penally, Pembrokeshire, Wales. The western set of kilns have a Grade II* heritage listing.

== Description ==
The two sets of limekilns are located on the south side of a private access road to the Kiln Park holiday park, off the A4139 road between Tenby and the village of Penally. The main set of six large kilns (Grade II* listed) are built against the north face of a quarry and are faced with dressed limestone. The exterior wall has five arched entrances and four ventilation windows. A vaulted passageway runs the entire length of the interior, which used to contain a small railway.

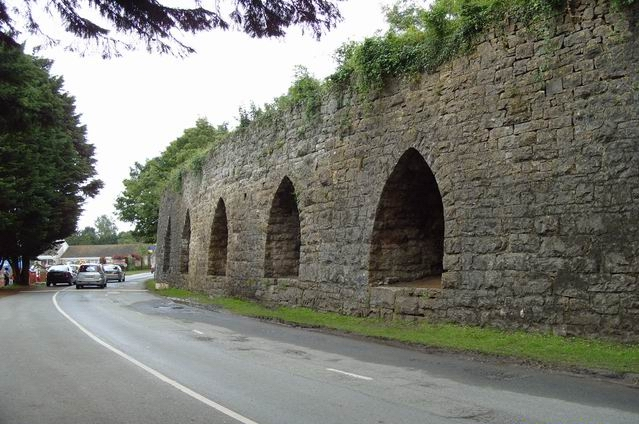
Eastern row of limekilns on the south side of the Kiln Park access road

The second set of six kilns (Grade II listed) are 250 metres to the east of the main group, following a bend of the park's access road. There are vaulted access spaces between each kiln.

The kilns are 9 metres high and the largest surviving limekilns in Pembrokeshire.

They have been a scheduled monument since 1989.

== History ==
Limekilns were originally built for the Black Rock limestone quarries circa 1800, but in 1811 the marshland was reclaimed behind Tenby's burrows and the lime industry lost its easy supply of water. The second (current) set of twelve kilns were built circa 1865, accessed by a branch of the Pembroke and Tenby Railway (which had been recently opened).

The later kilns are believed to be connected to Saundersfoot colliery blacksmith, John Nash, a substantial property holder in the area at the time.

The Black Rock quarry was still active till the early 1950s, and the Kiln Park caravan and camping park was developed after World War II, marking the end of industrial activity in the area.

The kilns received a heritage listing in 1996.
