= Manor House Wildlife Park =

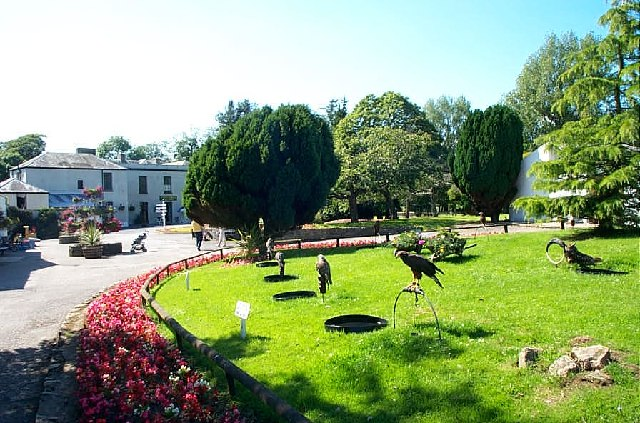
- Interactive map of Manor House Wildlife Park
- 51°41′8″N 4°45′51″W
- Location: Pembrokeshire, Wales
- Land area: 52 acres (21 ha)
- Website: Manor Wildlife Park

Manor House Wildlife Park is a 52-acre (21 ha) zoo located in Pembrokeshire, Wales, just north of the village of St Florence. It was bought in 2008 by television presenter Anna Ryder Richardson and Colin MacDougall and is more recently known as Manor Wildlife Park.

== Animal exhibits ==
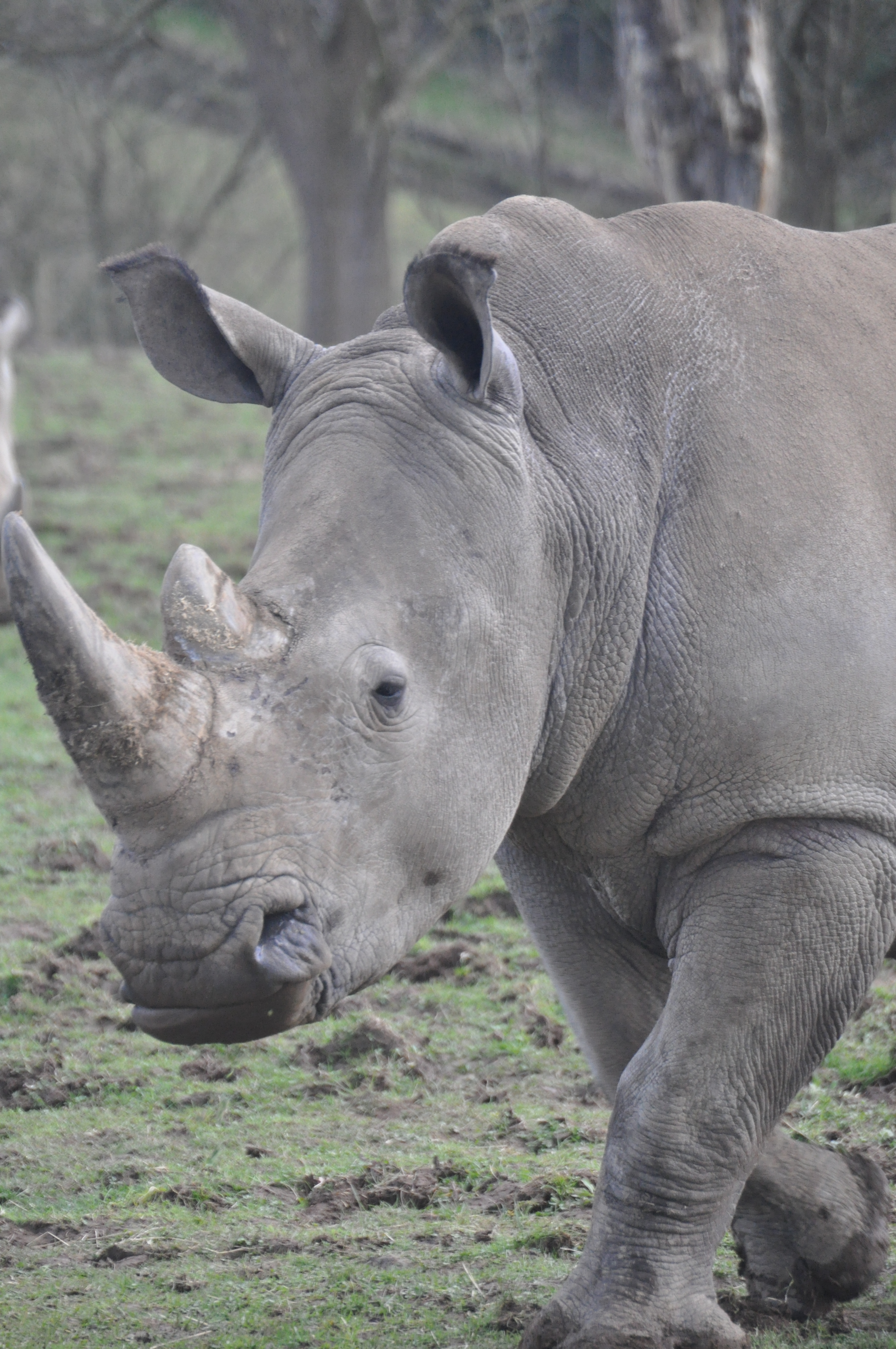
Rhino

Large animals include Southern white rhinos, oryxes, Damara zebras, tapirs, camels, llamas and Sumatran tigers; there are also smaller wild animals such as red pandas, meerkats, wallabies and three species of lemur (Black-and-white ruffed, Red-bellied and Ring-tailed), and a variety of birds, principally ostriches, emus, rheas and guinea fowl.

=== Endangered species ===
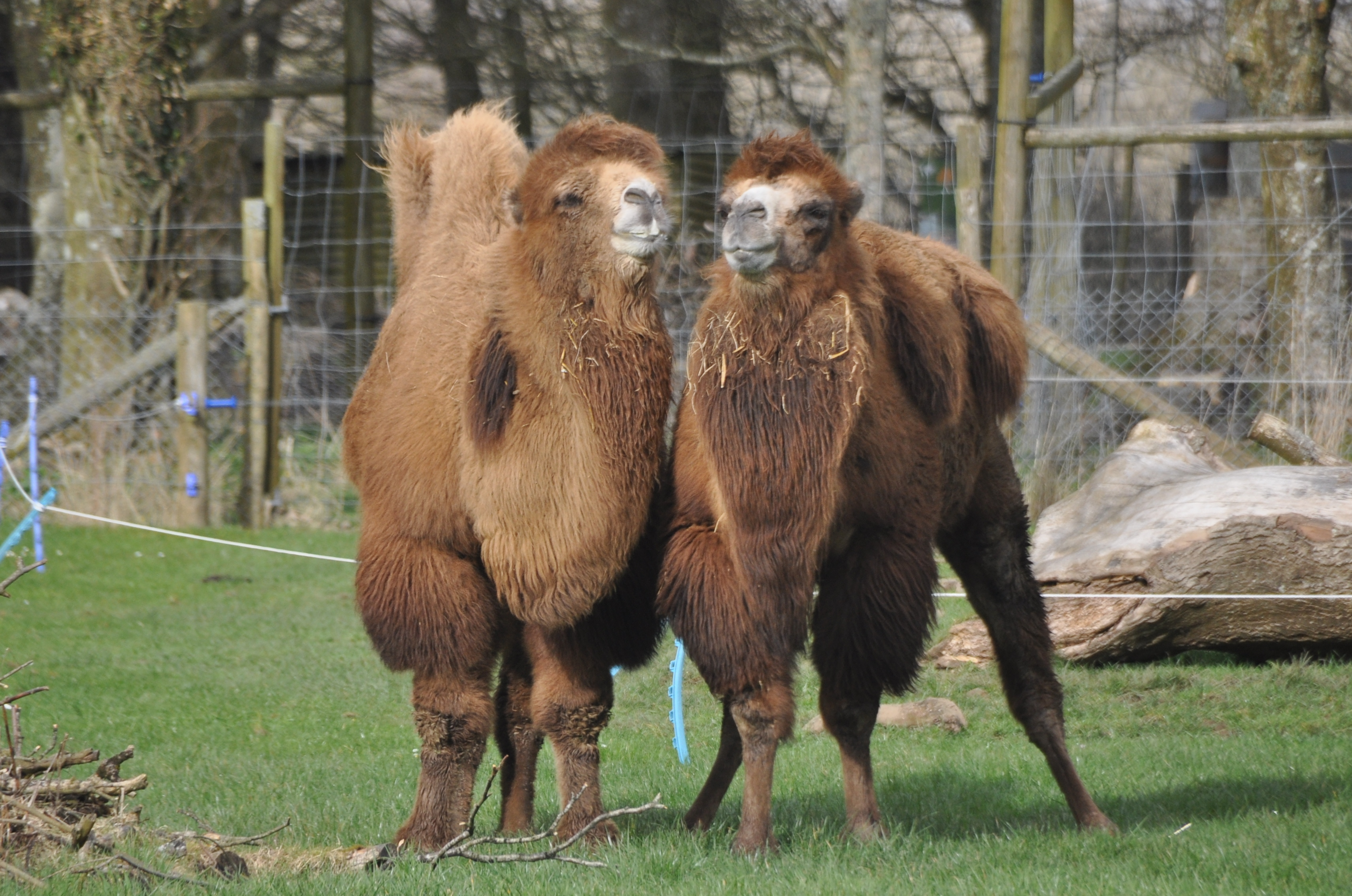
Camels

As well as the endangered Sumatran tigers, Siamang gibbons and Ring-tailed lemurs, the park is home to the white rhino "Zamba", one of three Southern white rhinos at the park, and the first to be bred from artificial insemination in the UK. Red ruffed lemurs are also critically endangered, according to IUCN, and are part of the zoo's collection. In 2015, the park learned that they had been allocated a pair of critically endangered Sumatran tigers to support the European Endangered Species Programme. In 2018, the park welcomed two endangered red panda sisters from Odense Zoo in Denmark, they now live in their own little forest in the heart of the park.

== History ==
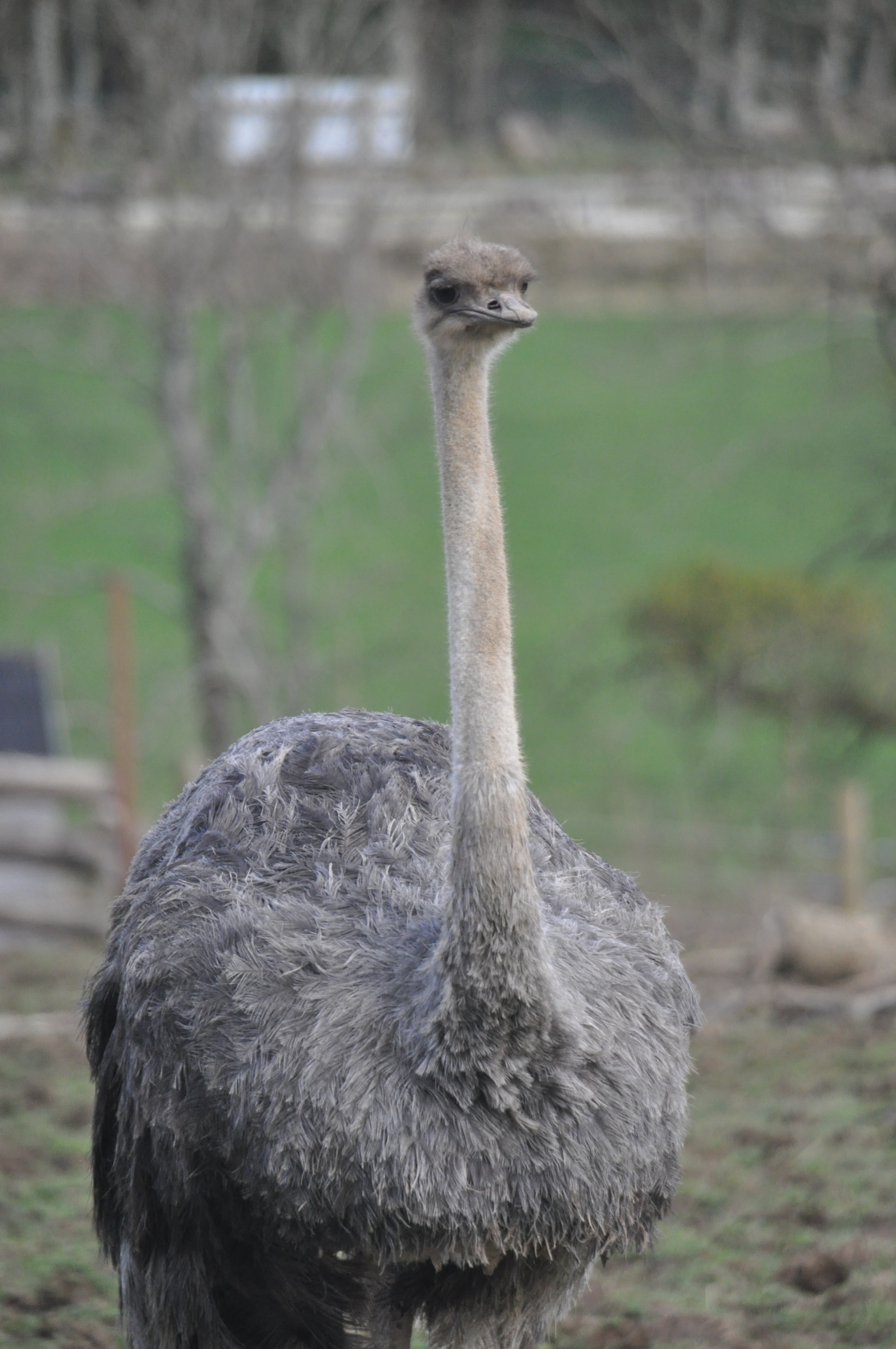
Ostrich

In 2002 the park was called Manor House Wild Animal Park and included a museum, souvenir shop and restaurant as well as animal exhibits.

TV presenter and property developer Anna Ryder Richardson and her then husband Colin MacDougall took over the zoo in 2008. In March 2012, it was announced that Richardson and her husband were to be prosecuted over alleged breaches of health and safety legislation after a mother and child were injured by a falling branch. Subsequently, charges against Richardson were dropped but her husband and the zoo pleaded guilty to four charges and were fined a total of £74,000, plus costs.

== Cultural references ==
In television

Anna Ryder Richardson made a video diary of the redevelopment of the zoo which became the TV film Chaos at the Zoo, narrated by Ruth Jones. Among the animals featured was a pair of endangered Siamang gibbons.
