= Porth-y-Tŵr =

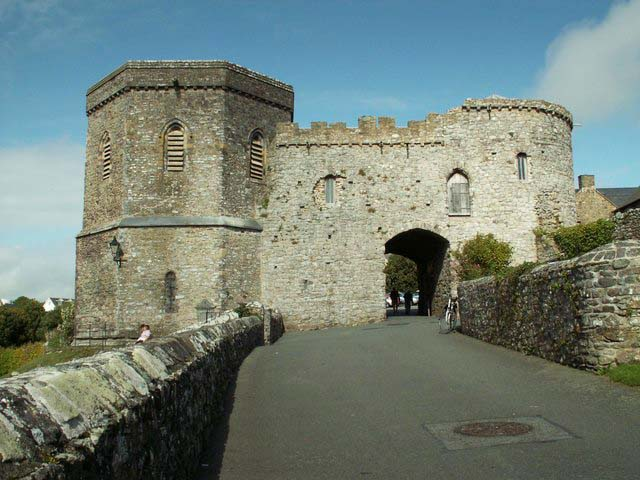

- Location within Pembrokeshire

General information
- Type: Bell Tower and Gatehouse
- Location: Cathedral Close, St Davids, Wales
- Coordinates: 51.8814°N 5.2676°W
- Renovated: 1929 (bell tower)

Listed Building – Grade I
- Type: Grade I listed
- Designated: 1963

Porth-y-Tŵr (Welsh for Tower Gate) is a gatehouse and bell tower overlooking St Davids Cathedral in the small city of St Davids, Pembrokeshire, Wales, UK. It is the sole survivor of four medieval gates to the walled Cathedral Close. The 13th-century octagonal tower, adjoining the gateway, now contains the cathedral's bells.

== Location and description ==
Porth-y-Tŵr is located less than 100m west of St Davids' main Cross Square and a similar distance southeast of the main south door of the cathedral. The bell tower to the north is a 60 feet (18 m) high two-storey octagonal stone building with pointed louvred windows. The gateway and rounded tower to the south are a lesser height and built from a rougher rubble stone.

It looks down on the cathedral from an elevated position. The Buildings of Wales describes the slope as setting "the cathedral and Bishop's Palace in a green bowl" with 39 steps leading down the steep incline from the gateway.

== History ==
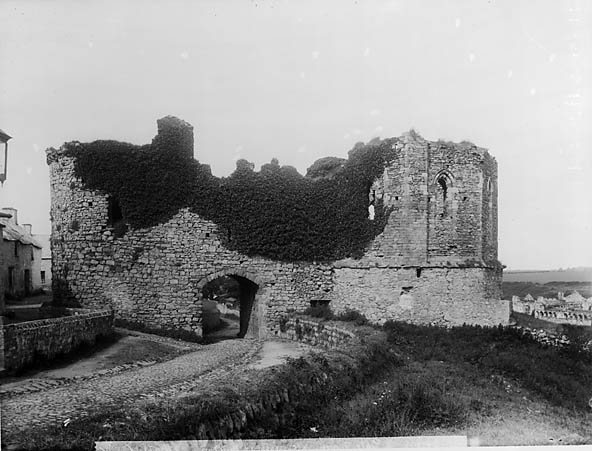
Porth-y-Twr (aka the Eastgate tower) before restoration

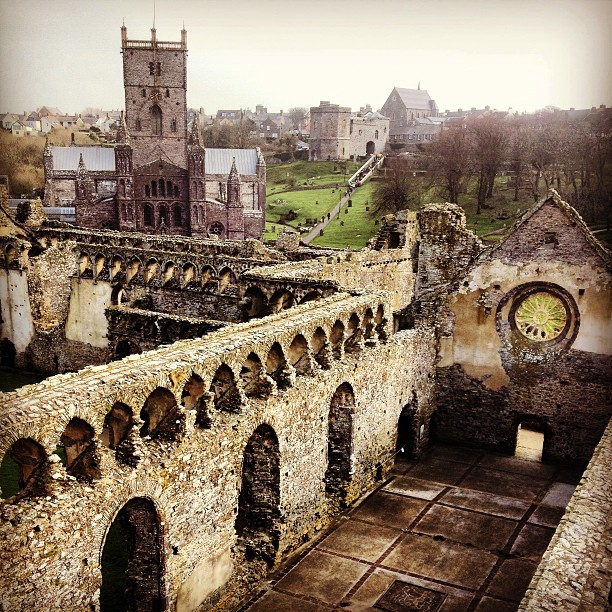
The ruined Bishops Palace with the Cathedral, Porth-y-Twr and the St Davids in the background

Porth-y-Tŵr is the sole survivor of four gates to the Cathedral Close, an ancient enclosure which dates back to at least the 12th century and has been described as an "ecclesiastical palladium" encircling the cathedral with a 1,200 yards (1,100 m) of crenellated parapet. The bell tower of Porth-y-Tŵr dates to the late 13th century, with the gateway and its south tower probably being added in the 14th century.

What is nowadays the bell tower was used by the bishops of St Davids for their consistory court and a record office for the episcopal see. The south tower and the range of rooms above the gate were used as a council chamber. Well appointed apartments, suitable for the mayor, were accessed via a doorway on the town side of the tower. Joseph Lord's 1720 map of the Cathedral Close clearly shows a plan of Porth-y-Tŵr, describing it as "The East gate and rooms adjoyning to it where the Bishop's & Mayor's courts were held".

Porth-y-Tŵr was in ruins by the 20th century and, in 1929, the octagonal tower was substantially restored by ecclesiastical architect W. D. Caroe, with funding coming from an anonymous donor.

In the 1930s a ring of bells were installed in the octagonal tower – the bells in the tower of St Davids Cathedral had been removed in 1730 to prevent the cathedral's tower collapsing. Two further bells were added in 2001, donated by the American Friends of St Davids Cathedral. There are ten bells in total, ranging from 269 kg to 1227 kg and hung for change ringing. One of the original cathedral bells is exhibited at Porth-y-Tŵr.

The towers and gateway gained a Grade I heritage listing in 1963.

== See also ==
- Grade I listed buildings in Pembrokeshire

== Sources ==
- Fenton, Richard (1811), A Historical Tour Through Pembrokeshire, London: Longman, Hurst, Rees, Orme & Co, pp. 60–61
- Lloyd, Thomas; Orbach, Julian; Scourfield, Robert (2004), The Buildings of Wales: Pembrokeshire, London and New Haven: Yale University Press, pp. 415–6, 419, ISBN 0-300-10178-3
