= Lydstep Palace =

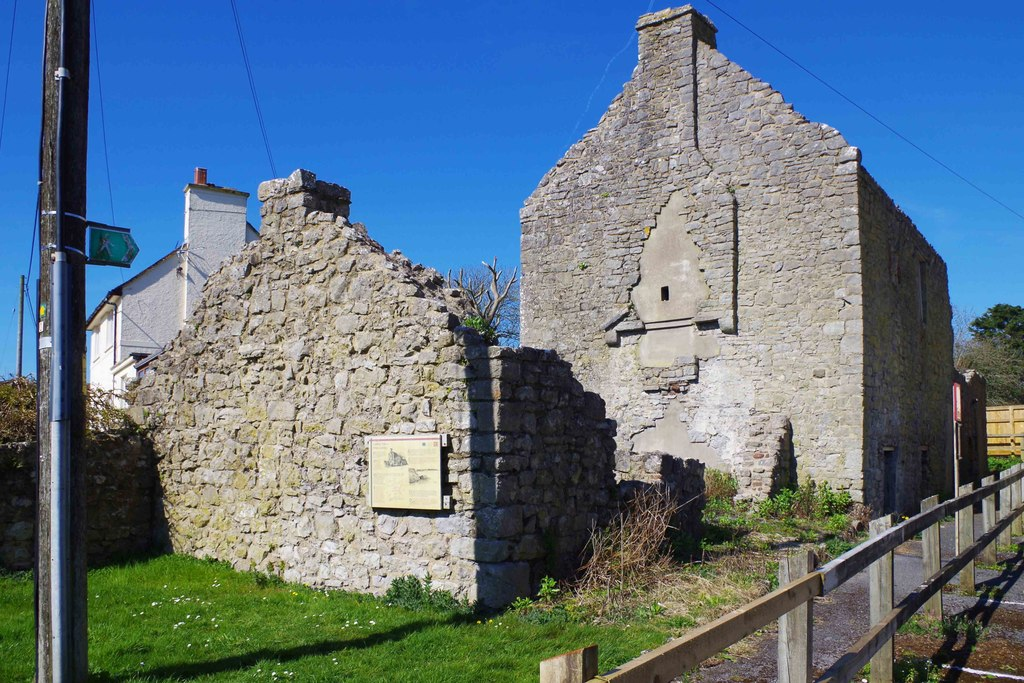
- The Lydstep Palace ruins

- Location within Pembrokeshire

General information
- Status: Ruinous
- Location: Lydstep, Pembrokeshire, Wales
- Coordinates: 51°39′05″N 4°46′04″W

Lydstep Palace (Welsh: Palas Lydstep) is a ruinous medieval hall house in the hamlet of Lydstep, Pembrokeshire, Wales.

Believed to have been built in the late 14th century or 15th century, the building was constructed from limestone and built in two levels, the upper floor containing a hall and the lower floor consisting of several barrel vaulted rooms, likely cellars. The two floors were not connected internally, only by external stone stairs. There has been speculation as to the purpose of the house; some sources attribute the building as a court of the Manor of Manorbier and Penally, but it has also been referred to as a hunting lodge of the Bishop Gower of St. Davids.

The house was traditionally known as the Place of Arms, and it is speculated that this became mutated to the Palace of Arms, leading to its current name of the Palace. The building is also referred to as The Old Palace.

The building was listed on May 14, 1970, given Grade I status, reserved for buildings of exceptional interest. The building is currently owned by Pembrokeshire County Council, who placed it up for sale in July 2013.
