= Saint Teilo =

Early medieval Welsh bishop and saint

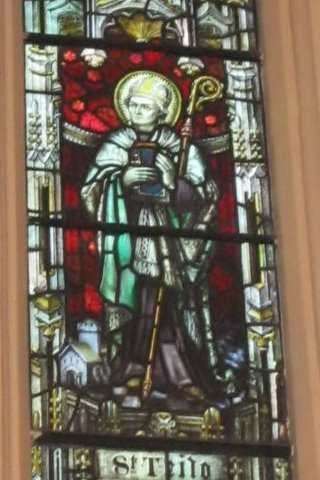
- St Teilo in Holy Trinity Church, Abergavenny
- Born: c. 500; Penally, Pembrokeshire, Wales
- Died: c. 560; Llandeilo Fawr
- Venerated in: Catholic Church; Eastern Orthodox Church
- Feast: 9 February (Wales); 25 November (Brittany); 29 November (Dol)
- Patronage: Cardiff

Saint Teilo (Latin: Teliarus or Teliavus; Breton: Teliau or Telo; French: Télo or Théleau; c. 500 – 9 February c. 560), also known as Eliud, was a British Christian monk, bishop, and founder of monasteries and churches. He was from Penalun (Penally) near Tenby in Pembrokeshire, south Wales.

Reputed to be a cousin, friend, and disciple of Saint David, he was bishop of Llandaff and founder of the first church at Llandaff Cathedral, where his tomb is. He also founded Llandeilo Fawr, as well as Penally Abbey at his place of birth.

== Biography ==
St Teilo may have been known as Eliau or Eilliau in Old Welsh. He was born at Penalun (Penally) around the year 500. Teilo's father is usually identified as Ensich ap Hydwn, and he was thought to be the brother of Anowed, and the uncle of Saints Ismael and Euddogwy. In some modern sources, he is accounted the grandson of Ceredig son of Cunedda and thus a member of the royal family of Gwynedd which later considered Saint David among its members. However, that rather dubious connection to a northern dynasty seems to depend on the Iolo Manuscripts now known to have been forged by Edward Williams.

Teilo's education took place at two institutions directed by saints. The first was established by the renowned Church leader and educator Dubricius (or Dyfrig), while the second was the school directed by Paulinus of Wales at "Wincdi-Lantquendi" (thought to be Whitland) where he met and became a close companion of St David (Dewi).

Like many founder-bishops, they appear to have had experience in battle. Along with companions Aeddan and Ysfael, he traveled to Mynyw (St. Davids), where Dewi founded his abbey, and ousted an Irish pirate named Bwya, killed his cattle and burnt his fortress to the ground. He succeeded Dubricius as Bishop of Llandaff after Dubricius retired to a hermitage on Bardsey Island. Teilo founded the first church in Llandaff, headed a monastic school, and become bishop over Glywysing & Gwent.

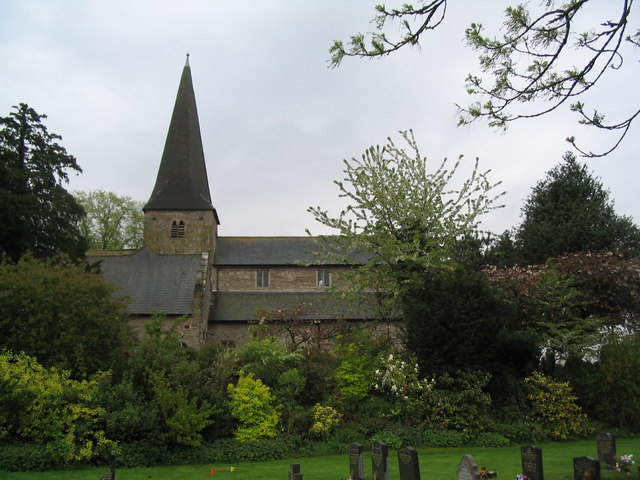
St Teilo's Church, Llantilio

In the 540s yellow plague, probably the Justinian plague, affected Britain. In 549 Teilo, with a small group of monks, moved to Dol in Brittany. He is reported to have stayed in Brittany for seven years and seven months and so must have left in 556 or 557, although some sources imply he returned in 554. They traveled through Dumnonia and were reported to have received the confession King Geraint and joined Samson of Dol at Dol: to this day the fruit groves they planted are known as the groves of Teilo and Samson. Legend has it that Teilo was asked by Budic II of Brittany to subdue a belligerent winged dragon, which he tamed and tied to a rock in the sea off Brittany.

After his return to Llandeilo Fawr, where he is documented to have died on 9 February, although the year, though probably around 560, is unknown, he became one of the most venerated men in Wales. At his death Teilo's body was said to have miraculously become three identical bodies, probably because his relics were claimed by three churches, Llandaff Cathedral, Llandeilo Fawr, and Penally Abbey. One tomb lies to the right of the altar of Llandaff Cathedral: his skull is kept in the south chapel in a reliquary, which was in the possession of the Mathew family from 1480 to 1658 after Sir David Mathew restored St. Teilo's shrine in Llandaff Cathedral, which was desecrated by pirates Briston. It was gifted by Bishop Marshall. It is stated that many miracles were witnessed there while he was alive and also later at his tomb. Relics are now even more widely distributed: they are venerated at Landeleau (Finistère), Plogonnec (Finistère), and Saint-Thélo (Côtes-du-Nord).

== Roman Martyrology ==
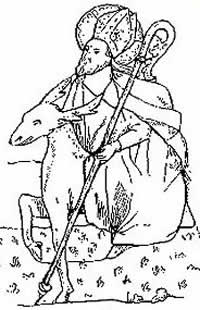
Saint Teilo, 15th-century France

In the 2004 edition of the Roman Martyrology, Teilo is listed under 9 February with the Latin name Teliávus. He is recognised as bishop and abbot at the monastery in Llandaf, Wales. He is said to have been canonized, though the exact date is not known, but he is acknowledged as one who undertook extraordinary labours in behalf of the church in Wales and Cornwall and who was also celebrated in Armorica (Brittany and surrounding provinces). He is not infrequently represented, as in many Breton churches, riding a stag.

== Legacy ==
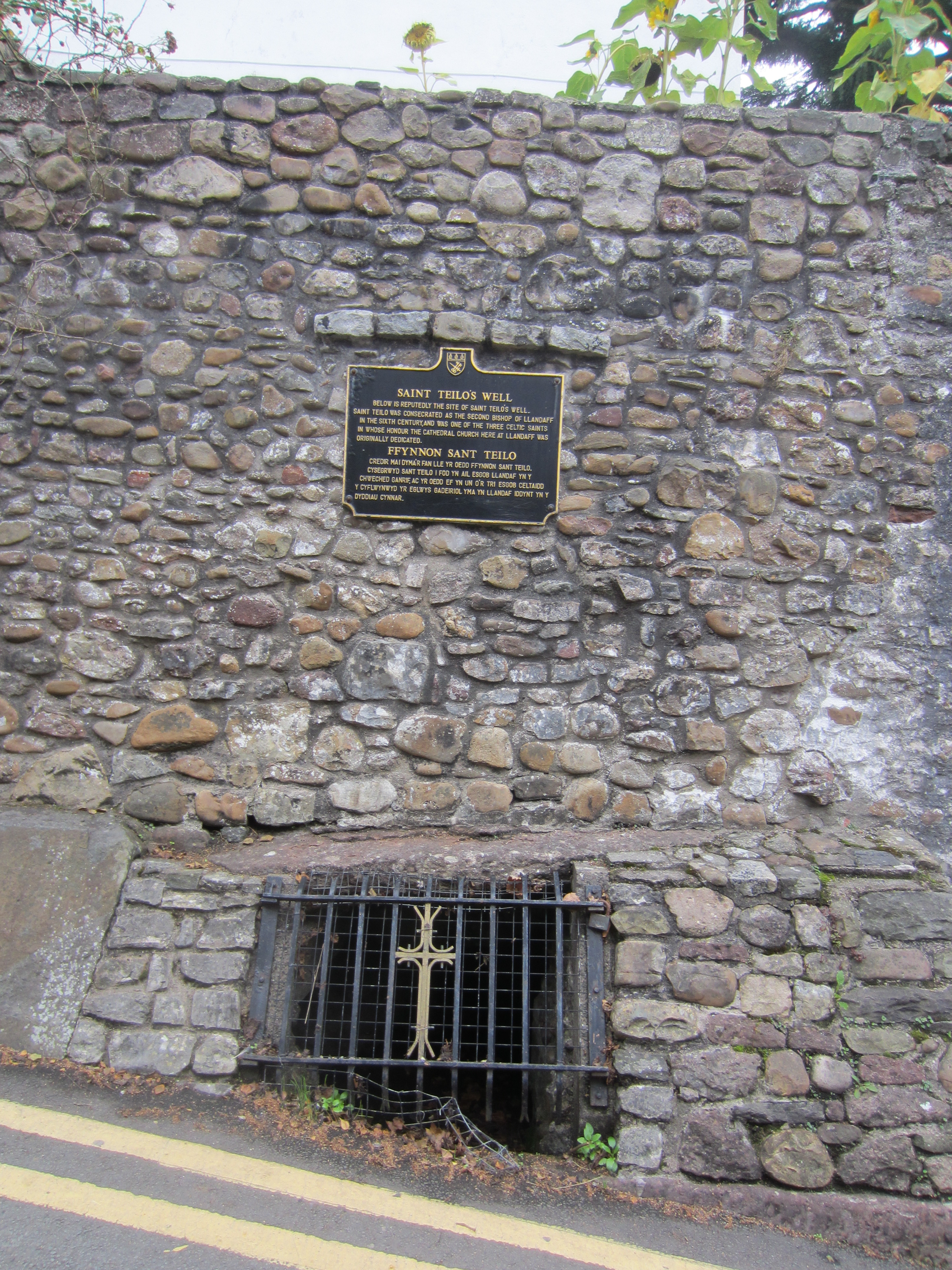
Saint Teilo's Well, outside Llandaff Cathedral

At least 25 churches and schools in Wales, Brittany, and Cornwall and Devon are dedicated to him including St Teilo's Church, Llandeloy, St Teilo's Church, Llantilio Pertholey, St Teilo's Catholic Church in Whitchurch, Cardiff and St Teilo's Church in Wales High School, Cardiff, while there are three villages in Brittany named Landeleau, Landêliau and Saint-Thélo after him.

St. Teilo is the Patron Saint of the city of Cardiff.

== Festival ==
The festival in honour of Saint Teilo is observed at different times of the year at different places: in Wales and at Saint Télo, on 9 February; at Dol, on 29 November; and on 25 November in the rest of the churches in Brittany. Following 1752, however, his fair at Llandeilo in Wales remained on the 9 OS, which was eleven days later on the Gregorian calendar i.e. 20 February NS, or on the Sunday following that date. The modern Two Saints Festival is run by Llandeilo Town Council in his honour and that of St David and runs from 22 February (9th OS) to 1 March.

== See also ==
- Merthyr Dyfan
