= Tudor Merchant's House =

Building in Tenby, Pembrokeshire, Wales

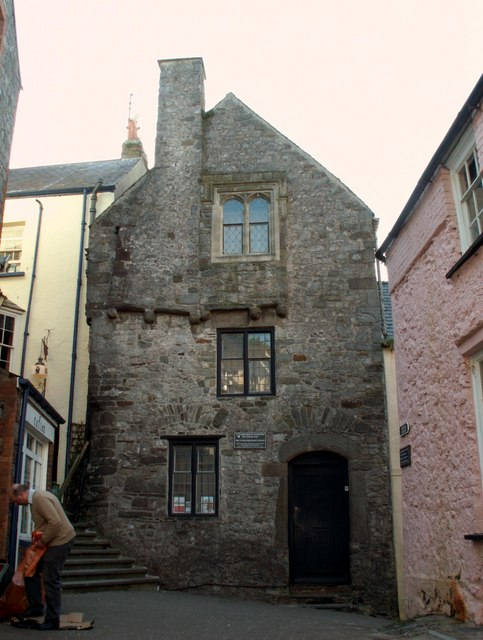
- Front exterior of the Tudor Merchant's House

- Location within Pembrokeshire

General information
- Location: Tenby, Pembrokeshire, Wales
- Coordinates: 51°40′18″N 4°41′53″W

The Tudor Merchant's House is a 15th-century town house located in Tenby, Pembrokeshire, in south west Wales.

The house was built in the late 15th century from stone. At the time, Tenby was a busy commercial port, and the occupant of this type of house would have been a merchant who'd trade goods that were brought into and out of the town's harbour. The building consists of three storeys; the lower floor was originally used as a shop by the merchant to conduct his business, the first floor as living quarters for the family and the upper floor for the sleeping quarters. The first floor would have been accessed by an external staircase and toilet facilities were located in a tower at the side of the house. The ceilings are supported by oak beams.

The building is the oldest house still standing in Tenby, and was listed with Grade I status (indicating a building of exceptional interest) on March 19, 1951. The building was donated by Tenby Corporation to the National Trust in 1938 who then repaired the building.

Today it is operated as a historic house museum, with the building furnished and decorated as it would have been in the year 1500 with a combination of period and reproduction items.
