= Whitewell Ruins =

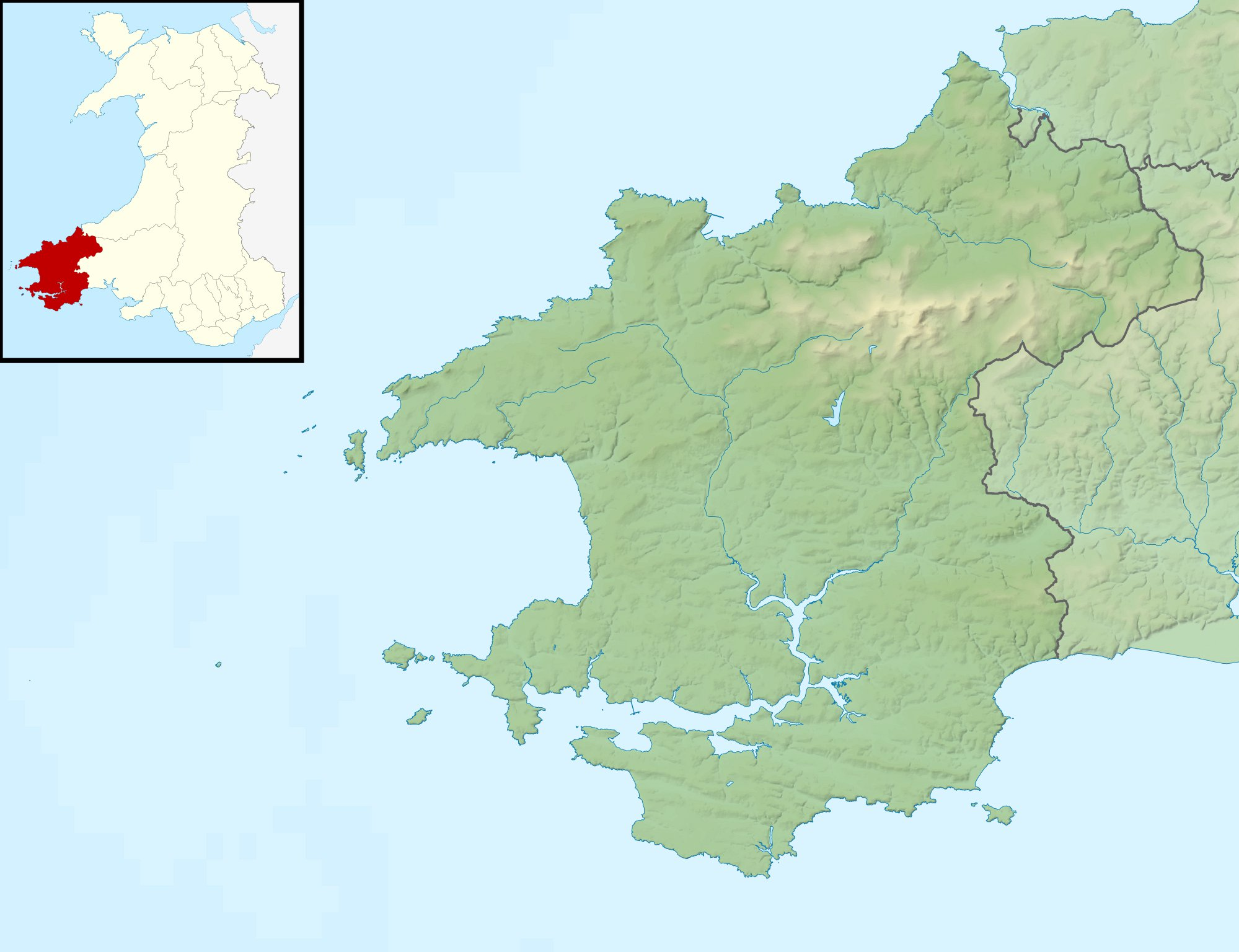
- Location within Pembrokeshire
- 51.658°N 4.7558°W
- Type: Manor house
- Location: Penally, Pembrokeshire

History
- Built: 14th/15th centuries

Site notes
- Architectural style: Medieval
- Governing body: Privately owned

Listed Building – Grade I
- Official name: Whitewell Ruins: Structure A
- Designated: 14 May 1970
- Reference no.: 6004

Listed Building – Grade I
- Official name: Whitewell Ruins: Structure B
- Designated: 26 April 1996
- Reference no.: 16922

Listed Building – Grade I
- Official name: Whitewell Ruins: Structure C
- Designated: 26 April 1996
- Reference no.: 16923

Scheduled monument
- Official name: Whitewell Ruins
- Reference no.: PE137

Whitewell Ruins is a historic site on the edge of the village of Penally, Pembrokeshire, Wales. The site consists of three structures, called A, B and C. The purposes of the structures are not fully understood, although sources agree that the largest, Whitewell Ruins: Structure A, was a medieval manor house and that Structures B and C served as ancillary buildings of some type. All three structures are Grade I listed buildings and the site is a Scheduled monument.

== History and description ==
Whitewell Ruins stands in the grounds of Whitewell Farm to the south-west of the village of Penally and north-east of the hamlet of Lydstep. (Note: Although Cadw term the three structures, Whitewell Ruins A, B and C, the Royal Commission on the Ancient and Historical Monuments of Wales terms them Whitewell Remains I, II and III on their Coflein database.) The site is largely surrounded by a caravan park.

Whitewell Ruins: Structure A, the largest element of the remains, is considered to be the remnant of a medieval manor house. Cadw dates it to the late 14th, or early 15th centuries. The Royal Commission on the Ancient and Historical Monuments of Wales dates it up to a century later, to the 15th or 16th centuries. It comprises a main building about 20m long and 7m wide, with a later wing. Structure B stands to the east of Structure A and is a much smaller building. Its purpose is unclear. Structure C stands to the west of the main block and consists of a single gable wall. The rest of the building has been lost, partly due to the building of the much later house, Whitewall in the Ruins, which dates from the 19th century. Cadw's scheduled monuments listing, while noting the "very ruinous" condition of the site, identifies the remains of fireplaces, lancet windows, and some masonry vaulting.

In their Pembrokeshire volume in the Buildings of Wales series, Thomas Lloyd, Julian Orbach and Robert Scourfield devote three lines to the "scant ruins" at Whitewell, and draw comparisons with the plans of West Tarr Medieval House and Carswell Medieval House, both of which are also located at Penally. Whitewell Ruins: Structures A, B, and C, are all Grade I listed buildings and the site is a Scheduled monument.

== See also ==
- Carswell Medieval House
- West Tarr Mediaeval House

== Sources ==
- Lloyd, Thomas; Orbach, Julian; Scourfield, Robert (2004). Pembrokeshire. Buildings of Wales. New Haven, US and London: Yale University Press. ISBN 978-0-300-10178-2. OCLC 52946802.
