= Peak Wildlife Park =

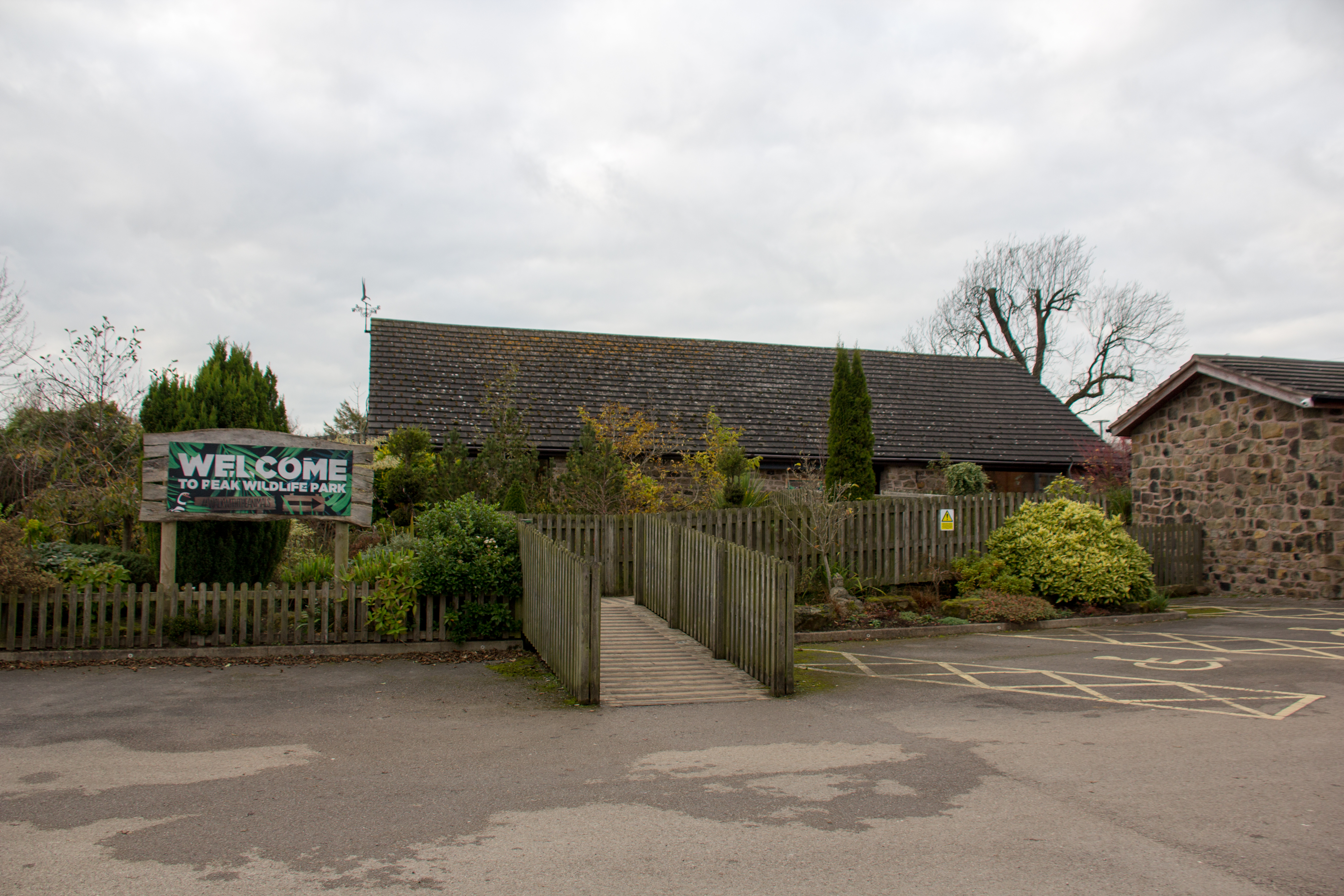
- The entrance to the park in 2017
- Interactive map of Peak Wildlife Park
- 53°03′40″N 1°55′25″W
- Date opened: 1991 (as Blackbrook Zoological Park); 2015 (as Peak Wildlife Park)
- Location: Winkhill, Staffordshire, England
- Land area: 75 acres (30 ha)
- No. of species: 17
- Website: peakwildlifepark.co.uk

Peak Wildlife Park is a zoo in central England. The nearest towns are Leek, Ashbourne and Stoke-on-Trent.

The zoo was originally known as Blackbrook Zoological Park, but entered administration in 2014 and closed. It was purchased by Jake Veasey and Colin MacDougall and reopened under its current name in 2015.

== History ==
Logo as Blackbrook Zoological Park

Blackbrook Zoological Park was established in 1991 by Diana Holloway and her son, Mark Rubery. Holloway was already experienced in running a wildlife visitor attraction, having owned and run Hillside Bird Oasis in Mobberley, Cheshire since 1974. Blackbrook quickly developed into a large bird collection in its own right. Following Diana Holloway's death in 2006, running of the zoo passed to her son Mark. Development and expansion continued in subsequent years: in 2006, a new entrance, gift shop and café were constructed, and in 2008, a £500,000 penguin exhibit was added. Hillside Bird Oasis was forced to close to the public in 2002 following complaints from local residents over increasing traffic levels, but it was still maintained by the owners as a private breeding facility. In 2008 the zoo became a charity and begun to focus on conservation and education. The zoo received no government grants.

Some of the animals that are exhibited are listed below:

=== Birds ===
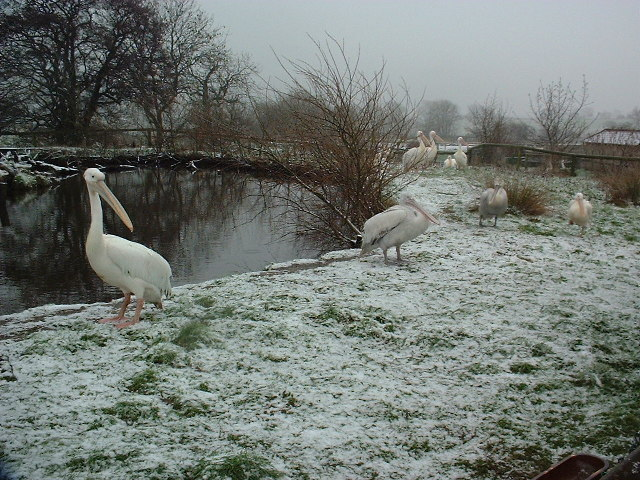
Pelicans at the zoo in winter

- Humboldt penguin
- Chickens

=== Mammals ===
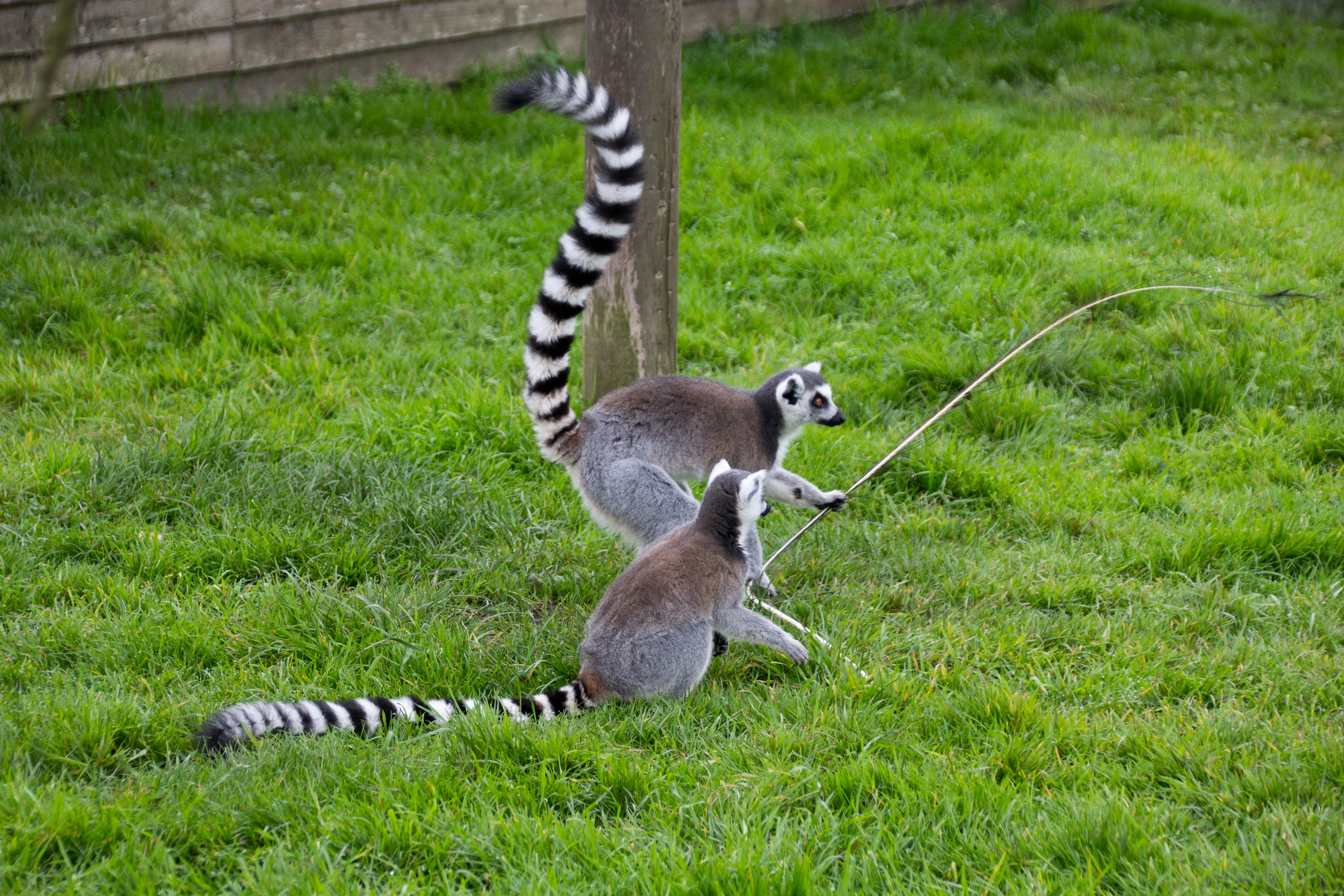
Lemurs playing in the park

- Meerkat
- Black-and-white ruffed lemur
- Wallaby
- Maneless zebra
- Brown lemur
- Flemish Giant rabbit
- Patagonian mara
- Ring-tailed lemur
- Red panda
- Cameroon sheep
- African pygmy goat
- Valais Blacknose sheep
- Dik-dik
- Asian short-clawed otter
- Polar bear
- Bush dog
- Red squirrel
- Dwarf mongoose

=== Reptiles ===
- African spurred tortoise
