= West Tarr Mediaeval House =

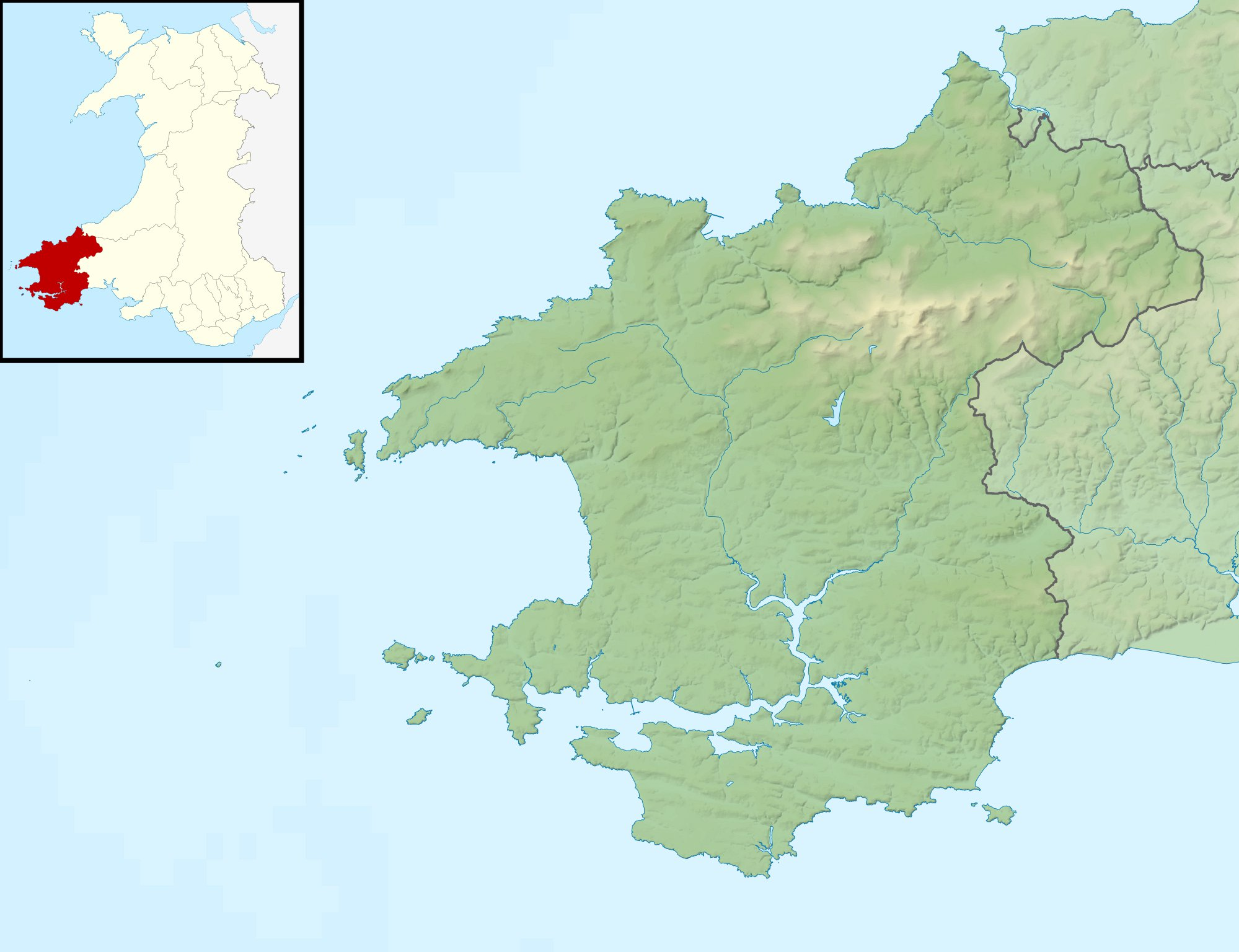
- Location within Pembrokeshire
- 51.6734°N 4.7652°W
- Type: House
- Location: Penally, Pembrokeshire

History
- Built: 14th century

Site notes
- Architectural style: Mediaeval
- Governing body: Cadw

Listed Building – Grade I
- Official name: West Tarr Medieval House
- Designated: 26 April 1996
- Reference no.: 16920

Scheduled monument
- Official name: West Tarr Vaulted Hall House
- Designated: 13 June 1985
- Reference no.: PE423

Listed Building – Grade II
- Official name: Old Building East of West Tarr Medieval House
- Designated: 26 April 1996
- Reference no.: 16921

West Tarr Mediaeval House is a historic site south of the village of St Florence, in the community of Penally, Pembrokeshire, Wales. The site consists of two structures, the remains of the house and an ancillary building. The house is a Grade I listed building and a Scheduled monument. The outbuilding is listed at Grade II.

== History and description ==
The Royal Commission on the Ancient and Historical Monuments of Wales suggests that West Tarr has elements of both a hall house and a tower house. Their Coflein database record draws comparison with such house types in Ireland. The Gatehouse Gazetteer suggests similarities to a Bastle house, a type more commonly found in the Scottish Borders. In a paper for the Pembrokeshire Historical Society Gerralt Nash considers another such medieval house identified in Haverfordwest and, noting similar types of near-coastal fortified dwellings in the vicinity such as Carswell Medieval House and Whitewell Ruins, suggests that the defensive nature of such structures was a response to piracy. (Note: The Haverfordwest house has been reconstructed at the St Fagans National Museum of History.) Cadw, in contrast, does not identify any defensive features at West Tarr. In their Pembrokeshire volume in the Buildings of Wales series, Thomas Lloyd, Julian Orbach and Robert Scourfield suggest that the defensive nature of the house was passive in character, i.e. it provided a place of refuge rather than offering offensive opportunities. The greater prevalence of such structures in the richer south of the county, particularly in locations proximate to the coast, indicates a need for the inhabitants to protect themselves from pirates making excursions along the navigable rivers. The earliest documented evidence for the building is a roll of 1324 which identifies the smallholding as equivalent in value to a tenth of a knight's fee. Such fees were payable to the Earls of Pembroke, the major landowners and the primary power in the area.

The house consists of two vaulted rooms, an upper storey and a lower undercroft. The construction material is mainly limestone rubble with some larger stones used for structural integrity. The structure is 7.5m long, 5m wide and 6.5m high. There is evidence of fireplaces at both levels and a small section of stair connecting the two. Cadw has undertaken restoration of the building's roof. West Tarr is a Grade I listed building and a Scheduled monument. The ancillary building is listed at Grade II.

== See also ==
- Carswell Medieval House
- Whitewell Ruins

== Sources ==
- Lloyd, Thomas; Orbach, Julian; Scourfield, Robert (2004). Pembrokeshire. Buildings of Wales. New Haven, US and London: Yale University Press. ISBN 978-0-300-10178-2. OCLC 52946802.
- Nash, Gerralt (2022). "A Tudor Trader's House From Haverfordwest". Journal of the Pembrokeshire Historical Society. Haverfordwest: Pembrokeshire Historical Society.
