= Monkton, Pembroke =

Village and parish in Pembrokeshire, Wales

Coordinates: 51.68°N 4.93°W

Monkton: Welsh: Cil-maen
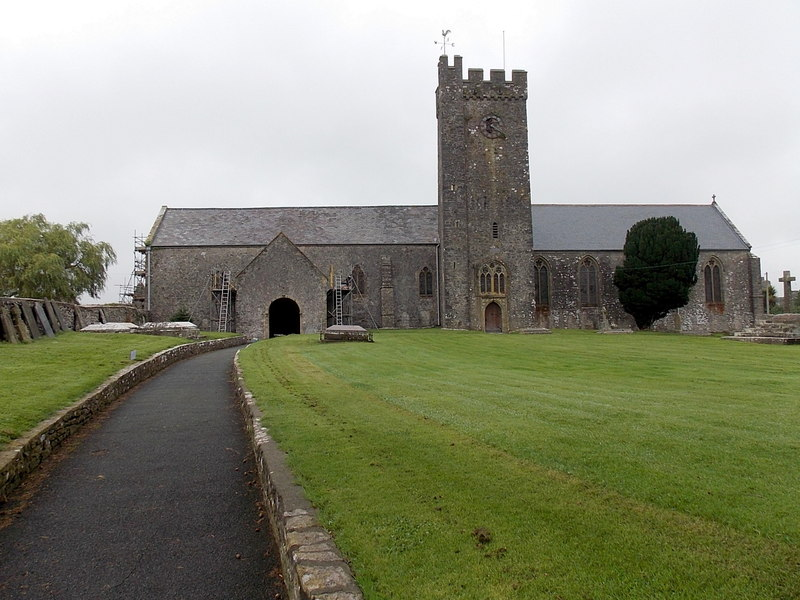
- Parish church of St Nicholas and St John

- Location within Pembrokeshire
- OS grid reference: SM973015
- Principal area: Pembrokeshire
- Country: Wales
- Sovereign state: United Kingdom
- Police: Dyfed-Powys
- Fire: Mid and West Wales
- Ambulance: Welsh

Monkton is a village and parish adjoining Pembroke, Pembrokeshire, Wales. According to the 2001 census, the population was 1,688.

== History ==
Monkton Priory, on a hill across the river from the Pembroke Castle, was founded in 1098 by Arnulf de Montgomery. Monkton Old Hall was originally a guest house for the Priory.

In 1833, the parish was part of the Hundred of Castlemartin, with a population of 1,128, and included Hundleton, Bentlass and other small settlements.

In 2000, Monkton was ranked the 14th most disadvantaged place in Wales and was given access to the Communities First programme. Pembrokeshire Action to Combat Hardship no longer has a base in the village, having closed due to repeated burglaries.

== Education ==
Monkton Priory Community Primary School has approximately 221 pupils. The village also has a dedicated centre for gypsy traveller learners, the Monkton Priory School Project.

== Worship ==
The Church of St Nicholas & St John is part-Norman and part early Welsh. It was a priory church until the Dissolution of the Monasteries. It is a Grade I listed building and has two chapels.

== Demographics ==
Monkton has a gypsy traveller site at Castle Quarry, formerly known as Catshole Quarry.
