= St Davids Bishop's Palace =

Ruined medieval palace in Pembrokeshire, Wales

Coordinates: 51.8821°N 5.2703°W

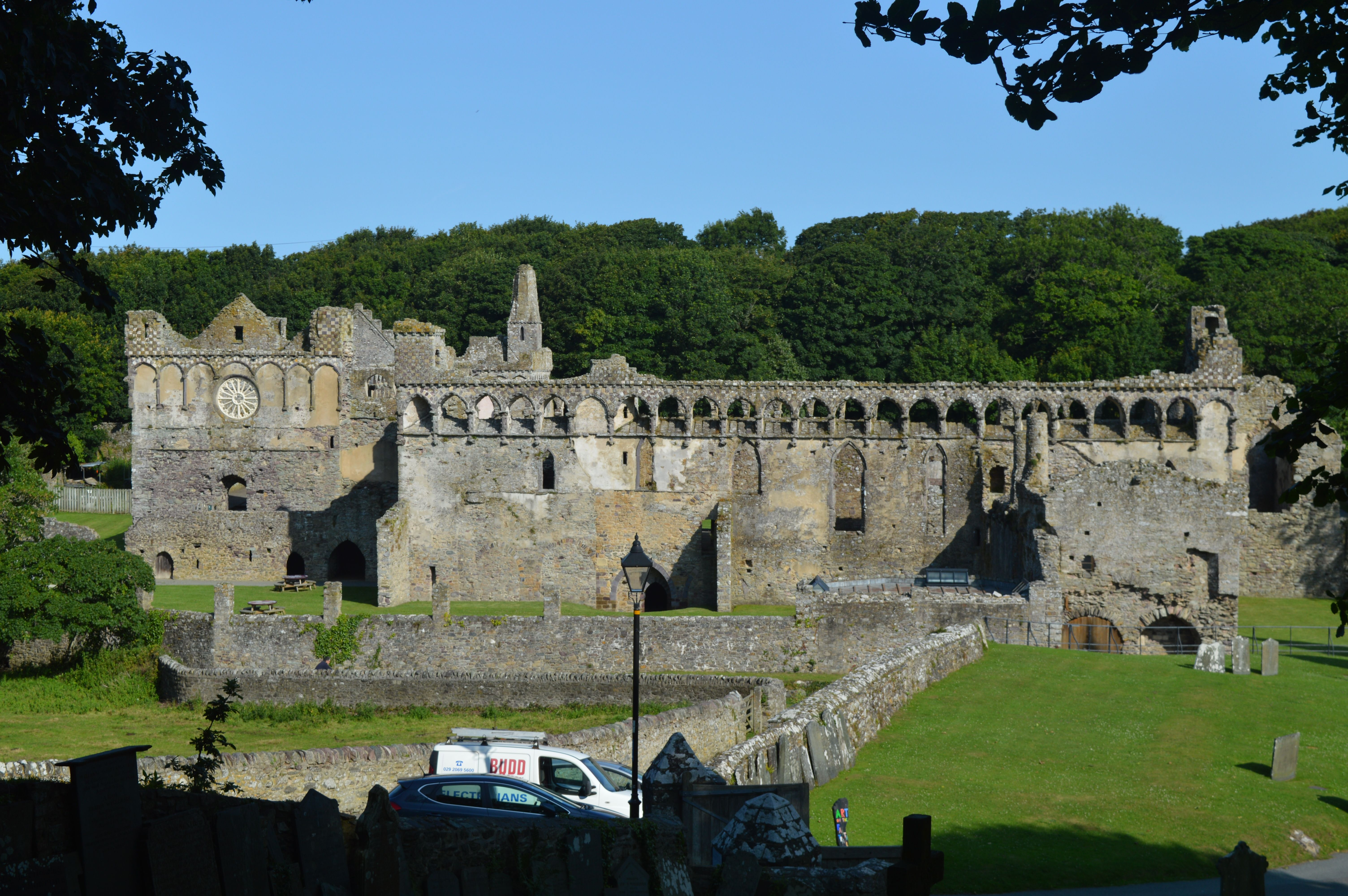
Bishop's Palace

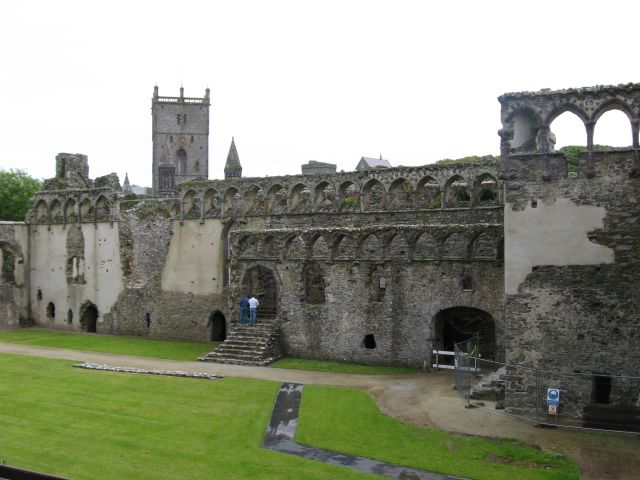
Courtyard and East Range, showing view to Cathedral behind

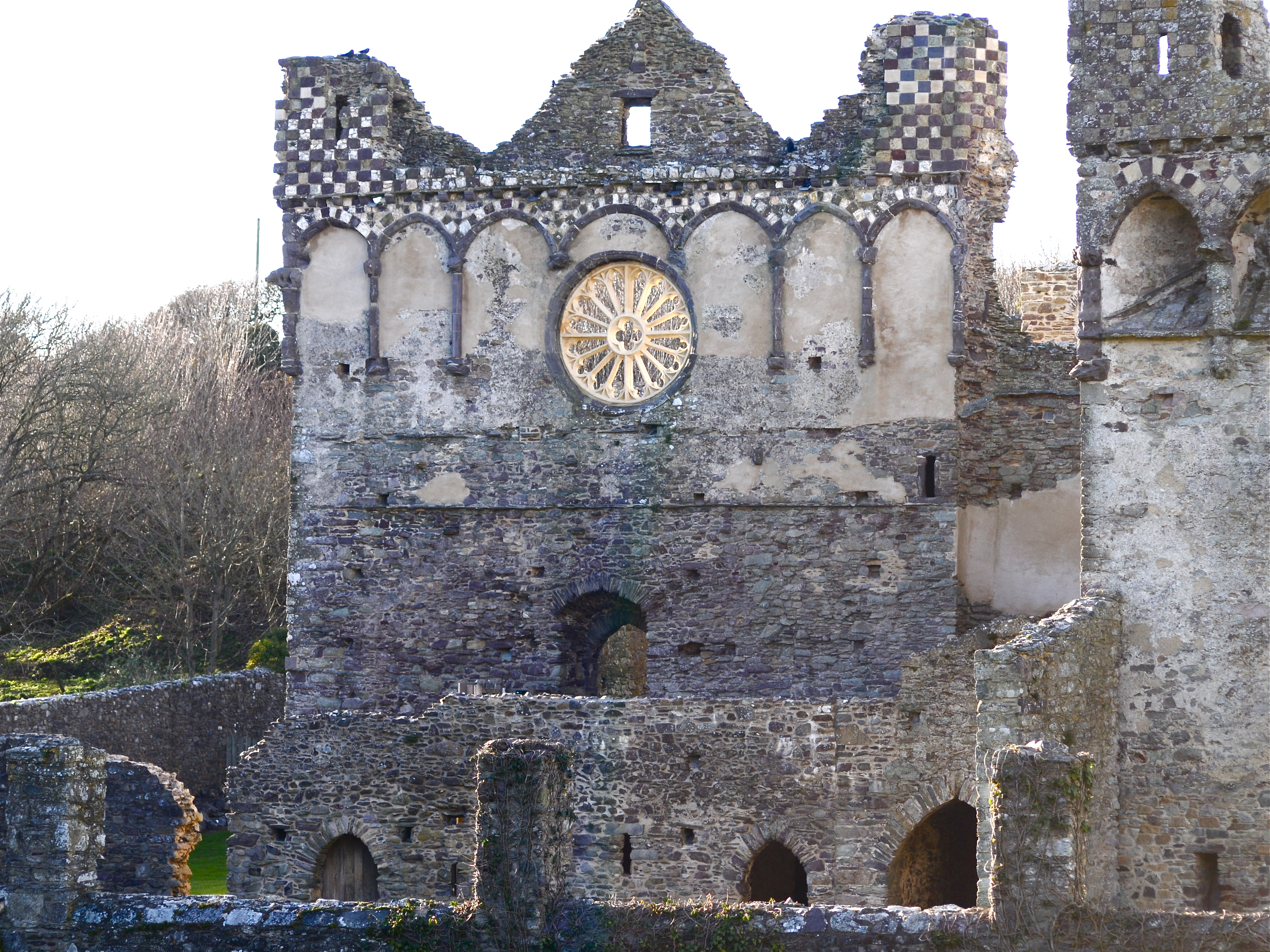
Detail showing wheel window in the east gable of the ruined Great Hall

St Davids Bishop's Palace (Welsh: Llys yr Esgob, Tyddewi) is a ruined medieval episcopal palace located adjacent to St Davids Cathedral in the city of St Davids, Pembrokeshire, one of the most important ecclesiastical sites in Wales. The site dates back to the 6th century, although the building that stands today dates largely from the late 13th and 14th centuries.

The palace is under the management of Cadw, the historic environment service of the Welsh Government. It is open as a visitor attraction and an open-air theatre, and being part of the city's cathedral precinct, there are more than 300,000 visitors a year. It is a Grade I listed site.

== Early history ==
St Davids became home of the Marcher Lords, responsible for guarding the border between England and Wales, so would have been a site of great strategic importance. It was also considered a hugely important religious site, housing relics of Saint David, patron saint of Wales. William the Conqueror is said to have visited as a pilgrim in 1081.

The original monastery that stood on the site was established in the 6th century and, over the succeeding four centuries, was ransacked at least 10 times by Norse raiders. The arrival of the Normans in the 11th century brought some stability. They appointed a Norman bishop and attempted to protect the site by building a motte-and-bailey fort and, later, a stone defensive wall.

== Establishment of the palace ==
The Bishop's Palace has been described as the work of a series of "builder bishops", with work carried out in the late 13th and 14th centuries.

In 1284, King Edward I visited St Davids on a pilgrimage, and this visit may have inspired some earlier work because Bishop Thomas Bek, who served from 1280 to 1293, was among his former statesmen. Bishop Bek was responsible for construction of the chapel in the south-west corner, the hall, the private apartments and the gate.

The man responsible for much of the site that can be seen today was Bishop Henry de Gower (1328–1347). He carried out major works in the cathedral itself, built the Great Hall with wheel window in the east gable, the distinctive arcaded parapet and the porch. Gower's main legacy is the two great ranges. The east range – the simpler of the two – was the first to be built. The much grander south range was built for entertaining.

The beginning of the Reformation also heralded the decline of the Bishop's Palace. In 1536 Bishop William Barlow stripped the lead from the roof. Legend has it that he used the money to pay for the dowries of his five daughters. However, as he had no daughters at that time, and the first marriage of a daughter did not occur until about 25 years later, the story was probably fabricated by his many enemies. He made so much money from this that a sixteenth-century account said that more than twelve years revenue of the bishopric would have been needed to cover the cost of replacing it, and the building fell into disrepair. Bishops stayed less at St Davids and, by the middle of the 16th century, the chief episcopal residence had been relocated to Abergwili, Carmarthenshire. In 1616, Bishop Richard Milbourne applied for a licence to demolish some of the buildings. By 1678, when another licence for demolition was sought, the palace was considered beyond repair.

== Site significance ==
Ralph A. Griffiths, Professor Emeritus of history at Swansea University, has described St Davids Cathedral and Bishop's Palace as "one of the most significant sites in the history of Christianity in the British Isles, and one of the earliest", and "where Welsh Christianity and nationalism are entwined".

Much of the town wall remains, particularly on the south side. The main gate into the cathedral compound, Porth-y-Tŵr, dates from about 1300 and remains intact. Inside the palace, most of the structure remains in spite of being open to the elements.

== Conservation work ==
The condition of Bishop's Palace began causing serious concern from the 1990s. Construction materials had included a mixture of local stone and Precambrian volcanic rock. Exposure to the elements was affecting key features of the highly decorated stonework, windows and sculptures, causing erosion. In some places, walls were becoming so thin there was a danger of structural collapse.

Under the guidance of Cadw, a restoration programme began in 2003 and was completed in October 2009. The work involved the rebuilding of some walls and repair of damaged carvings. Conservation also provided an opportunity to improve accessibility, with floors replaced to make it possible to circuit the building's ground floor. The project was subsequently shortlisted for a Grand Prix Europa Nostra, an award from the Pan-European Federation of Cultural Heritage.

== Bishop's Palace in art ==
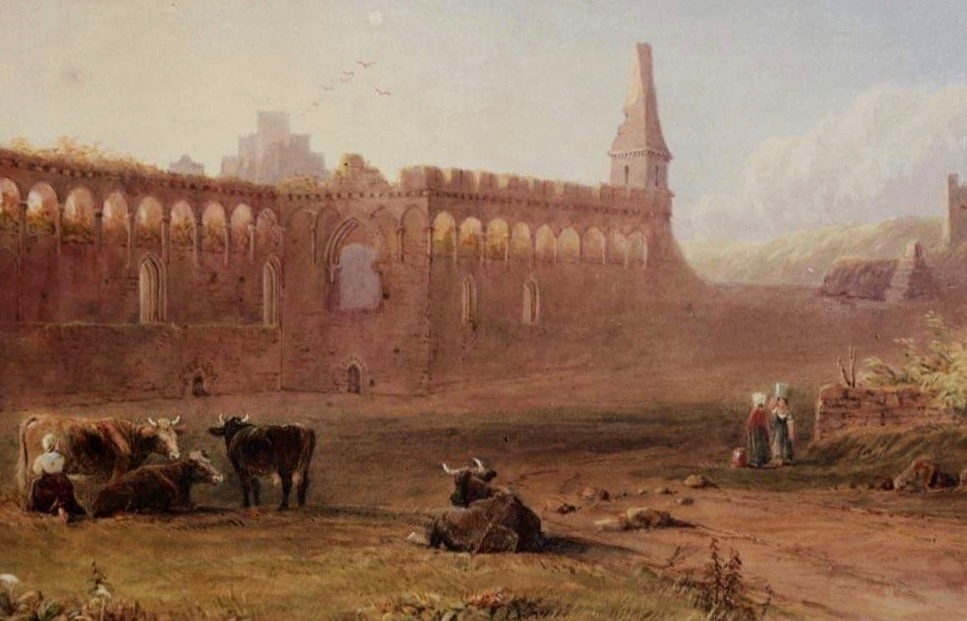
St Davids Bishop's Palace. Unsigned watercolour, probably late 18th century.

The Bishop's Palace captured the imagination of the British painter J. M. W. Turner, and features in his South Wales Sketchbook of 1795, now part of the Turner Bequest at the Tate. There are two images, one of which was drawn inside the ruins. The second, in graphite and watercolour, shows the entrance to the Great Hall.

== See also ==
- Lamphey Bishop's Palace

== External sources ==
- Cadw listing for the Bishop's Palace
- Plan of Palace site and key features
