= St Nicholas & St John, Monkton =

Church in Pembrokeshire, Wales

Coordinates: 51.675363°N 4.923515°W

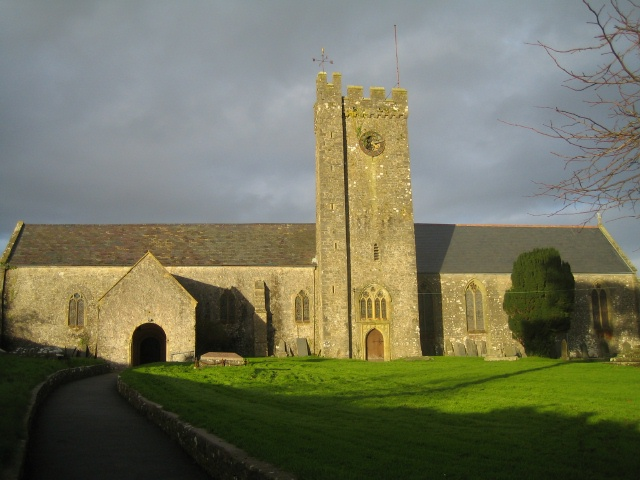

- Location in Pembrokeshire
- Country: Wales
- Denomination: Church in Wales

History
- Dedication: Saint Nicholas and St John

Architecture
- Heritage designation: Grade I
- Architectural type: Church

The Church of St Nicholas & St John, formerly the Priory Church of St Nicholas, is the parish church of Monkton, a village on the south bank of the Milford Haven Waterway, in south Pembrokeshire, Wales. The church's medieval origins link it to Monkton Priory, founded in the 11th century. It is a Grade I listed building.

== Location ==
The church is 200m southwest of the contemporary Pembroke Castle. It is close to the ruins of Monkton Priory on the south bank of Milford Haven Waterway.

== Description ==
The part-Norman church has an uncharacteristically long nave as a result of changes in function and structure over the centuries. It is built from rubble stone which was probably rendered as traces of render remain. The roofs are slate. There are numerous windows and doors of varying design and age, and much alteration, including signs that there had been an upper floor. Some parts are buttressed. The tall tower has an embattled parapet and projecting stair tower. There are bell-lights, eight bells of date 1897, and a 1907 clock.

Internally, the vaulting may have been added. The font is 1882 on a 13th-century base. The pulpit and lectern are late 19th century. The 1887 organ is by Wade & Meggitt of Tenby. The stained glass is 19th and 20th century. Windows, doors and other structural, functional and decorative features, variously dating from the 12th and all the subsequent centuries, are described in detail in the Cadw listing.

=== Memorials ===
There are many memorials and some tombs from the 15th century onwards, including:

- Sir Francis Meyricke, died 1603
- John Owen, died 1612
- Sir Hugh Owen, died 1670
- Benjamin Davis, died 1776
- Sir Hugh Owen of Orielton, died 1786
- Sir Hugh Owen of Orielton, died 1809
- Catherine Humphreys, died 1790
- Lady Charlotte Owen of Orielton, died 1829
- Abraham Leach of Corston, died 1843

and some unidentifiable, probably earlier effigies. A World War I memorial plaque lists the names of 27 killed.

== History ==
The site on which this church now stands was a Celtic Christian community before the coming of the Normans. The precise date of the foundation of this former priory church is not known, but in 1098 a church of St Nicholas was founded within Pembroke Castle. As the precursor to the present castle may have been at Monkton Priory, this may be the foundation date. The comprehensive priory site, of which this church was a part, is described on the Royal Commission's online database Coflein. The priory continued until 1532, when the monasteries were dissolved. The nave of the priory church was retained as the parish church of Monkton; the rest fell into ruin, with part even being used as a tennis court.

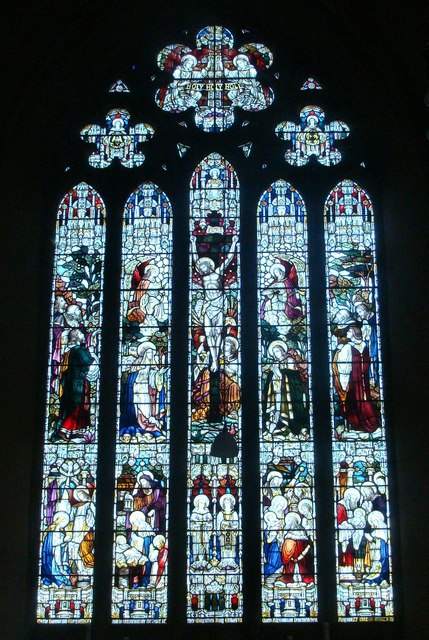
East window

Lewis, in his Topographical Dictionary of Wales of 1833 described the church as

…dedicated to St. Nicholas, formerly the conventual church of the priory, and all that remains of that establishment, is an ancient and venerable structure, partly in the Norman, and partly in the early English, style of architecture, with a Lady chapel at the eastern end, now roofless, but having four handsome windows on the southern side, and one in the eastern end. . . "

The parish population at that time was 1,128.

In the 19th century, mostly under the Rev. D. Bowen, vicar from 1877 to 1926, there were major repairs and restoration by local artisans, with new fittings and sympathetic re-use of much older fixtures. Fragments of frescoes were found to be beyond repair, but at the end of the century, mural paintings were added. The restoration completed in 1895 was comprehensively reported in The Welshman.

The church (as the Priory Church of St Nicholas) was first listed in 1951 as a "substantial medieval priory church with vaulted nave, porch and transept, and fine monuments". Further historical details can be found in the Cadw listing.

The present parish is in the Benefice of South West Pembrokeshire, in the Diocese of St Davids, and the church is known as Ss Nicholas & John, Monkton.
