= Penally =

Village, parish and community in Wales

Penally: Welsh: Penalun
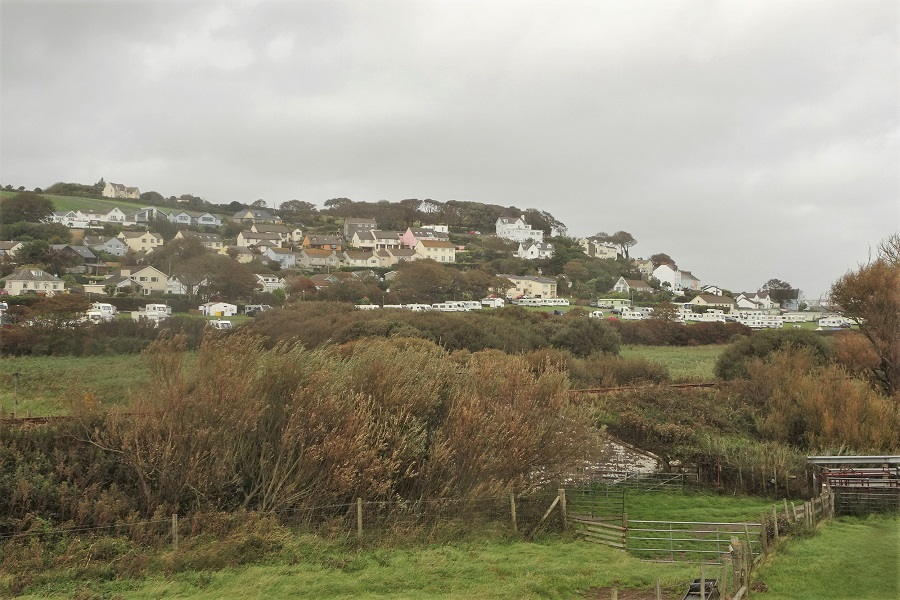

- Location within Pembrokeshire
- Population: 848 (2011)
- OS grid reference: SS1170099221
- Principal area: Pembrokeshire
- Preserved county: Dyfed
- Country: Wales
- Sovereign state: United Kingdom
- Post town: TENBY
- Postcode district: SA70
- Police: Dyfed-Powys
- Fire: Mid and West Wales
- Ambulance: Welsh
- UK Parliament: Mid and South Pembrokeshire
- Senedd Cymru – Welsh Parliament: Ceredigion Penfro
- List of places UK Wales Pembrokeshire 51.660°N 4.723°W Map of the community

Penally (Welsh: Penalun) is a coastal village, parish and community 1 mile (1.6 km) southwest of Tenby in Pembrokeshire, Wales. The village is known for its Celtic Cross, Penally Abbey (a Gothic style country house), the neighbouring St. Deiniol's Well, WWI Practice trenches, and Penally Training Camp (World War I and World War II).

== History ==
Archaeological investigations of nearby Hoyles Mouth Cave shows evidence of Paleolithic and Iron Age use. Artifacts found there can be seen at Tenby Museum.

Trefloyne (formerly Trellwyn) is an ancient manor, the seat of the Bowen family, and marked as a separate parish on a 1578 map, but little evidence of the original manor house remains; it was still standing at the beginning of the 19th century, but in ruins by the 1880s.

The community of Penally has three sites with hall/tower houses dating from the Middle Ages. Those at Whitewell to the south-west of the village, and at West Tarr Mediaeval House, near St Florence to the north, are Grade I listed buildings and Scheduled monuments, while the Carswell Medieval House, also near St Florence, is listed at Grade II*.

The Black Rock Quarry, between Penally and Tenby, provided heavy industry in the area during the nineteenth century, particularly after the Pembroke to Tenby railway arrived in 1863. Twelve large limekilns were built on a branch line c.1865. They are the largest surviving limekilns in Pembrokeshire.

After World War II heavy industry made way for tourism, with the Kiln Park camping and caravan resort being developed near the old quarry site.

== Notable people ==
- Saint Teilo (ca.500 – ca. 560), a British Christian monk, bishop, and founder of monasteries and churches. He was from Penalun (Penally).

== Governance ==
An electoral ward with the same name exists. This ward stretches towards Saundersfoot whilst avoiding Tenby. The total population of this ward at the 2011 census was 1,710.

== Amenities ==
The local parish church is dedicated to St Nicholas & St Teilo. It was originally called St Nicholas' but was changed at the end of the 19th century; it is suggested that Penally was the birthplace of St Teilo, a Christian leader in the 6th century. The church houses the Penally Celtic cross which was originally located in the graveyard but has since been restored and moved into the church. The village has one pubs, The Cross Innand bus service 349.

Views overlook Tenby, Caldey Island, Giltar Point, and Tenby Golf Course, which runs alongside Tenby South Beach to the south of the village. Waymarked public footpaths allow people to walk through the links to the beach and to Tenby. Another golf course lies inland, to the west of the village, at Trefloyne.

== Railway ==
Penally railway station on the Pembroke Dock branch of the West Wales Line is operated by Transport for Wales Rail, who also manage the station. Trains stop here on request every two hours in each direction, westwards to Pembroke Dock and eastwards to Tenby, Whitland, Carmarthen and Swansea.

== Military installations ==
The Penally Training Camp was a military facility at the western edge of Penally. The camp was opened in 1860 to provide musketry training after the Crimean War and was extensively used in World War I and World War II. This is a Defence Training Establishment used by regular, reserve and cadet forces.

Penally Gallery Range is a small Ministry of Defence firing range adjacent to Giltar Point. The range, which was built in the middle of the 19th century, was used to train soldiers during World War I and World War II. When the firing range is being used, red flags are flown and there are sentries stationed at the two huts along the coastal perimeter line. If firing is taken from beyond the 100 meter firing points (which run adjacent to the pathway which runs from railway station towards the beach) then an additional sentry post at Penally station level crossing is staffed. Part of the Pembrokeshire Coast Path is diverted along the A4139 road when the firing range is in use. The firing range has its own byelaws, which are displayed on signs around the firing range perimeter. The remains of the World War I practice trenches may be found towards the east of Giltar Point along the Pembrokeshire Coast Path.

In 2020 and 2021, the UK Home Office used the Penally Training Camp to house asylum seekers. The conditions in the camp were described as inadequate with some of the asylum seekers protesting that their human rights were being ignored and comparing the camp to a prison. The Welsh Government issued a statement: "The camp does not meet the basic human needs of people seeking a new life in the UK" and called for its use to end as quickly as possible. The use of the camp to house asylum seekers ended in March 2021.

The site was closed in 2022, and subsequently put up for sale.

== Wildlife ==
In March 2014 several birdwatchers came to see a great spotted cuckoo, a bird species last seen in the UK in 2009. The inexperienced migrant came to Wales instead of Spain.
