= St Florence =

Village, parish and community in Pembrokeshire, Wales

St Florence: Welsh: Sain Fflwrens
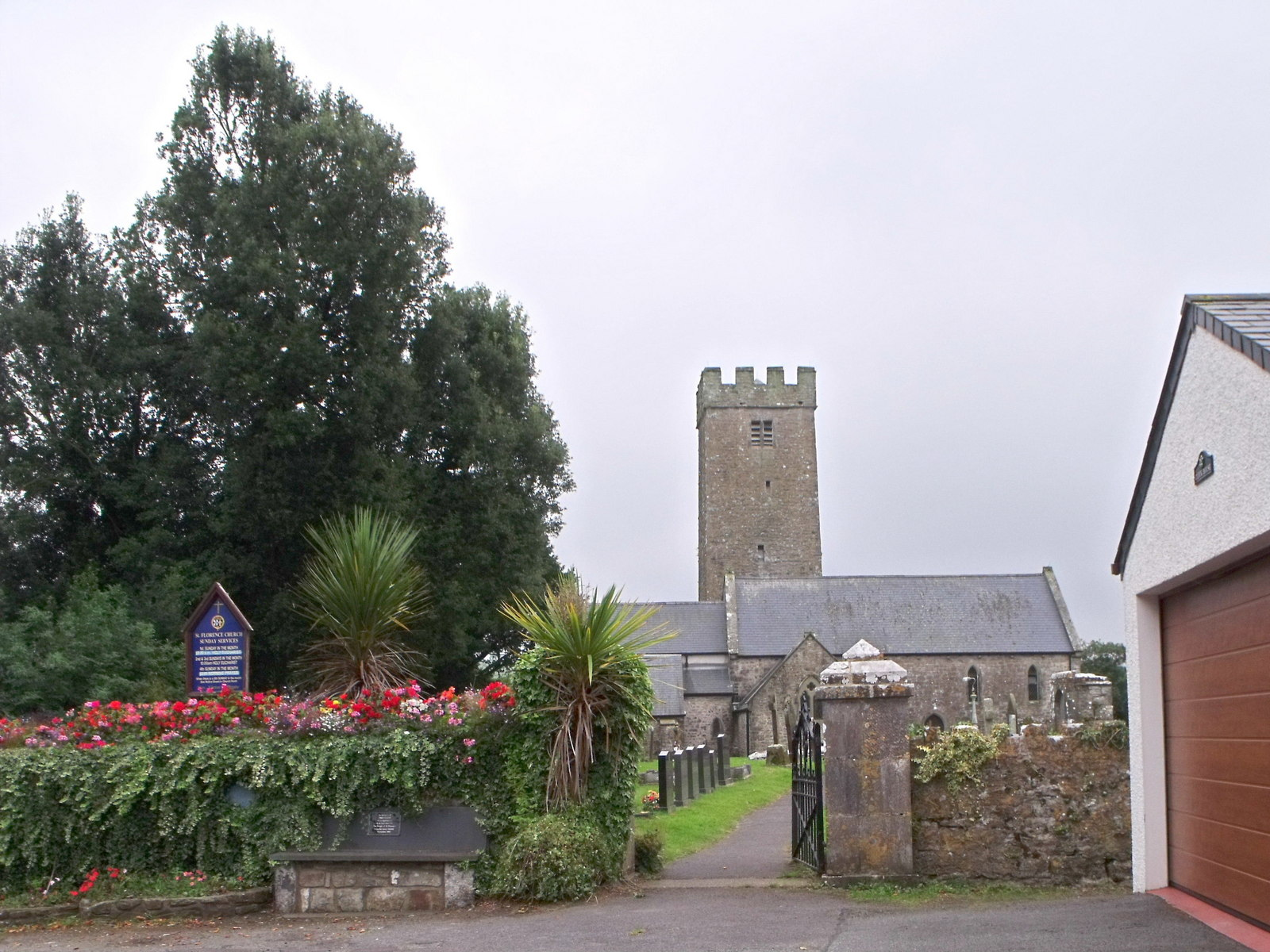
- St Florence's church

- Location within Pembrokeshire
- Population: 756 (2011)
- OS grid reference: SN0808901170
- Principal area: Pembrokeshire
- Preserved county: Dyfed
- Country: Wales
- Sovereign state: United Kingdom
- Post town: TENBY
- Postcode district: SA70
- Dialling code: 01834
- Police: Dyfed-Powys
- Fire: Mid and West Wales
- Ambulance: Welsh
- UK Parliament: Mid and South Pembrokeshire
- Senedd Cymru – Welsh Parliament: Ceredigion Penfro
- List of places UK Wales Pembrokeshire 51.676°N 4.776°W Map of the community

St Florence (Welsh: Sain Fflwrens) is a village, parish and community in Pembrokeshire, Wales. St Florence sits on the River Ritec that flows 4 miles (6 km) eastwards to its estuary in Tenby. The Church of St Florence is a grade II* listed building.

In 2001, the population was 490 (2001 Census Settlement data), 650 (2001 Census Community Council 993Ha) and 751 (Parish Headcount).

== History ==
St Florence dates back to Norman times and remains of 16th and 17th-century buildings still exist, with Flemish chimneys, characteristic of Pembrokeshire, in evidence, named after Flemish settlers in the region. The river was navigable by small vessels as far upstream as St Florence until the 19th century when it silted up as a result of local land reclamation. The village is a noted stop on the Tenby to Whitland section of the Cistercian Way owing to its historical significance.

== St Florence Church (St. Florentius) ==
The 12th-century parish church is dedicated to St Florentius; it was restored in the 19th century, and is a grade II* listed building. In the church is a memorial to Robert Ferrar, the Protestant Bishop of St Davids, who was burned at the stake at Carmarthen during the reign of Mary in 1555.

== Geography ==
St Florence sits on the River Ritec that flows eastwards to its estuary in Tenby. East of St Florence on the north bank of the river is Ritec Fen, a Site of Special Scientific Interest (SSSI).

== Public Transport ==
The nearest railway station is Manorbier railway station, 1.4 miles (2.3 km) southwest of the village.

== Sport and leisure activities ==
St Florence's football side were the Pembrokeshire Division 3 Cup champions of the season 2006/2007. The village hosts an annual Duck Race on the river at Easter for charity.

To the north of the village on the B4318 is Manor House Wildlife Park. Other local attractions include Heatherton World of Activities and The Dinosaur Park.
