= Carew (surname) =

Carew is a Welsh and Cornish habitation-type surname; it has also been used as a synonym for the Irish patronymic Ó Corráin. Carey can be a variant.

== History ==
The Cambro-Norman Carew family sprang from the same stock as the FitzGeralds: viz. from the union of Gerald de Windsor alias Gerald FitzWalter (1070–1136), the Norman Constable of Pembroke, Pembrokeshire and Nest ferch Rhys, Princess of Deheubarth, the 'Helen of Wales'. These Carews descend from Gerald and Nest's oldest son William FitzGerald de Carew. The family home was at Carew, Pembrokeshire (Welsh: Caeriw) from a fortified site and later castle, and originally a holding of Nest's royal father, Rhys Ap Tewdwr. The usual derivation offered is that the root word is 'caer', Middle Welsh for 'fort'; the second element being possibly 'rhiw' – 'slope', or 'yw' – 'yew' (tree). The Pembrokeshire Coast National Park website has 'Caerau – fort (Locally pron Carey)'.

First, as will be shown below, not all modern Carews are of Carew, Pembrokeshire stock; some bear the name from cognate Cornish origins; and others as an Anglicised form, together with Carey, of the Irish patronymic Ó Corráin/Ó Carráin.

Secondly, some true Carews in Wales may have received their name in the variant form of 'Carey' or 'Cary', which is a traditional local pronunciation of the place Carew (see above), another version being 'Care-ew'. John Marius Wilson's 'Imperial Gazetteer of England and Wales' (1870–72) has 'Carew, or Carey, a village and a parish in the district and county of Pembroke'. Bannister (1871) writes that Carew is 'pronounced Car'-ew in Ireland; Car-ew' in Devon; Carey in Cornwall and Wales' (my italics). However, Carey in Britain generally is either from any one of at least six immigrant Gaelic-Irish patronymics Anglicised thus, or is from a Pre-Celtic or Celtic language river/habitation name in Somerset and Devon.

Gerald FitzWalter's second son Maurice FitzGerald, Lord of Lanstephan and grandson Raymond de Carreu, 'le Gros', took part, alongside Richard de Clare, 2nd Earl of Pembroke, or 'Strongbow', in the invasion of Ireland in 1171. The 'invasion' was almost a family affair, with many of the Cambro-Norman protagonists related through the matriarchal and 'polygamous' Nest: among the cousins of the Geraldines were Robert FitzStephen, Robert de Barry et al.

In Ireland, after the invasion, the de Carreus, or Carews, held the barony of Idrone in County Carlow, without relinquishing their holdings in Britain. William de Carreu (died 1213), held both manors of Carew and Idrone. Maurice de Carreu was in Edward 1's Irish Parliament in 1300. Raymond de Carreu appears in Irish records in 1302. Sir John Carew (died 1362), who also held the manor of Moulsford in Berkshire, was Justiciar of Ireland.

Another Norman branch, which may or may not be related to the Idrone Carews, said to be descended from Adam Montgomery de Carrew, settled in East Cork, at Garryvoe, in the 12th century. This family is described in 'British Museum Funeral Certificates', MS. No. 4820. They feature frequently in the 'Fiants' (Tudor records): e.g. John Careue of Garryvoe, 1582; Redmond & Peirse Carewe, 1600. They forfeited Garryvoe, as rebels against Cromwell's 'Commonwealth' in 1656. Paul MacCotter has claimed in 'Irish Roots' (1997) that the rare East Cork Carews survive under the form 'Carey'; although the Garryvoe family definitely died out in the male line in the 1660s (Brit Mus. MS 4820); and Carey in this area is regarded as an Anglicisation of Ó Ciaráin.

There is recorded evidence for Carew being used as a synonym of the Munster surname Ó Corráin/Ó Carráin. The 'Court of Claims' in Ireland, 15 July 1663, adjudicates a request for return of lands in and around Mobernan in County Tipperary forfeited by 'Teige Carrue alias O Carron'. Donald O Carrane of Mobernayne, 1586 was his ancestor. By the 17th century the Mobernan O Corrain sept had widely adopted Carew as an Anglicised form of their name: Conor Carew of Mobarnan, was a representative at the Catholic Confederation of Kilkenny, 1642. Thomas Carue (alias O Corrain) of Mobernan appears in the Dictionary of National Biography His brother, Sir Ross Carey, appears on the 1661 memorial of Anne Hyde, his wife, in Westminster Abbey. Carve, however, in his Lyra sive anacephalaeosis Hibernica claims that the usage of Carran for his family name is incorrect. He says "Prater hos alia est antiquae nobilitatis domus nimirum Domini Carue Imakellanse, a Thomas Carue (de quo Paulo ante tractavimus) suam protrahit parentelam, ex qua etiam aliae non ignobiles familiae excreverunt, quo abusive Hibernico Idiomate Carran appellantur. Ex his orti sunt Robertus Carve de Imakelly, & Roseus Carve de Moberman Equites aurati." (Carve, Thomas Lyra p. 47) The adverb 'abusive' means 'incorrectly' in this context.

Some Carews, according to family legend/family trees, moved from Pembrokeshire to the English West Country, and settled in Crowcombe in Somerset, Haccombe in Devon and Antony House in Cornwall. There the name has occasionally been used interchangeably, in records such as the 'Patent Rolls', with the indigenous Cary of the West Country, causing confusion. It has been claimed that 'Carey' is a variant of Carew in Cornwall, (neither name there is numerous). However, this claim seems to be based on the Carew family of Antony being allegedly known by the byname 'Carey' (Hanks & Hodges, op. cit. 1988), whereas this gentry family were usually known as 'Carew' not 'Carey'.

It is also highly likely that the surnames Carew and Carrow in Cornwall are variants of Cornish locative names such as Kerrow, Caroe &c. with derivations from either Celtic 'car/ker'- 'fort' or pre-Celtic 'car'- 'stone/stony'. This would mean that at least some Cornish Carews are indigenous to Cornwall, and therefore have no connection with the Welsh/Norman immigrant Carews of Antony.

In England the family became influential. The Devon Carews became Earls of Totness (1625, extinct 1629). A Devon man, Sir George Carew was President of Munster temp. Elizabeth 1st. Ironically, given the supposed family connection, one of his more formidable tasks was the destruction of the FitzGerald Earls of Desmond.

Cornishman Richard Carew of Antony was a noted late 16th-century historian of Cornwall; he wrote the fascinating 'Survey of Cornwall', published in 1602. Another family member, Alexander Carew, 2nd Baronet of Antony, was executed by Parliament for his lackadaisical support of their 'cause' in 1644. His half brother, John Carew, was a keener supporter of Cromwell: he was Commonwealth M.P. for Cornwall, and a signatory to the execution of Charles 1st; thus as a 'regicide' he was hanged, drawn and quartered by the returning royalists in 1660.

The Cambro-Norman Pembrokeshire Carew arms are 'Or, three lioncels passant, sable'.

The surname Carew has been adopted in Russia as Keyru. It originates from John Carew, an athlete from Sierra Leone who had a family in Russia including the actor Olah Keru, the singer Willy Keyru and international basketball players Victor and Katerina Keyru.

== Notable Carews ==
- Sir Alexander Carew, 2nd Baronet (1609–1644), British Member of Parliament involved in the English Civil War
- Ashley Carew (born 1985), English-Barbadian football player
- Bampfylde Moore Carew (1693–1759), English rogue, vagabond and impostor who claimed to be King of the Beggars
- Sir Benjamin Hallowell Carew (1761–1834) British admiral during the Napoleonic Wars, one of Horatio Nelson's "Band of Brothers"
- Charles Robert Sydenham Carew (1853–1939), British Conservative politician
- Cicely Carew (born 1982), American artist
- David Carew, Sierra Leonean economist and politician
- Dudley Carew (1903–1981), English journalist
- Elizabeth Carew (c. 1500 – 1546), mistress of Henry VIII of England
- Franciszek Kareu (1731–1802), Polish Jesuit, of English descent, Vicar General of the Society of Jesus during its suppression
- George Carew, 1st Earl of Totnes (1555–1629), English military commander
- George Carew (admiral) (c. 1504 – 1545), soldier, admiral and adventurer
- George Carew (cricketer) (1910–1974), cricketer for the West Indies
- George Carew (diplomat) (died c. 1613), English diplomat and historian
- James M. Carew (1932–2018), American politician
- Jan Carew (1920–2012), Guyanese novelist, playwright, poet and educator
- Joey Carew (1937–2011), West Indian cricketer
- John Carew (born 1979), Norwegian football player
- John Carew (regicide), one of the regicides of King Charles I
- John F. Carew (April 16, 1873 – April 10, 1951), US Congressman/Judge
- John Edward Carew (1782–1868), Anglo-Irish sculptor
- Joseph T. Carew (1848–1914), American department store owner
- Sir Matthew Carew (died 1618), English lawyer
- Michael Carew (born 1966), Trinidad and Tobago cricketer
- Nicholas Carew (Lord Privy Seal) (died 1390), Lord Privy Seal during the reign of Edward III of England
- Nicholas Carew (Henry VIII courtier) (c. 1496 – 1539), courtier and statesman during the reign of Henry VIII of England, husband of Elizabeth Carew
- Nicholas Carew (died 1311) (c. 1255 – 1311), courtier and soldier
- Peter Carew (died 1575) (c. 1514 – 1575), English adventurer and colonist of Ireland
- Peter Carew (soldier), an English soldier
- Ora Carew (1893–1955), American actress in silent films
- Sir Richard Carew, 1st Baronet (c. 1580 – 1643), English writer and Member of Parliament
- Richard Carew (1555–1620), Cornish antiquary
- Rod Carew (born 1945), Panamanian-born Hall of Fame baseball player
- Tate Carew (born 2005), American skateboarder
- Thomas Carew (1595–1640), English poet
- Tom Carew, Sierra Leonean Minister of Security
- Wayne Carew, Canadian businessman and politician
- William Aquin Carew (1922–2012), Vatican diplomat

== See also ==
- Antony House, Family seat of the Carews of Cornwall
- Baron Carew, a title in the British peerage
- Carew, Pembrokeshire, village in Wales
- Carew Castle in Pembrokeshire
- Carey (surname)
- The Green Eye of the Yellow God, poem by J. Milton Hayes whose protagonist is "Mad Carew"
