= Carew Bridge =

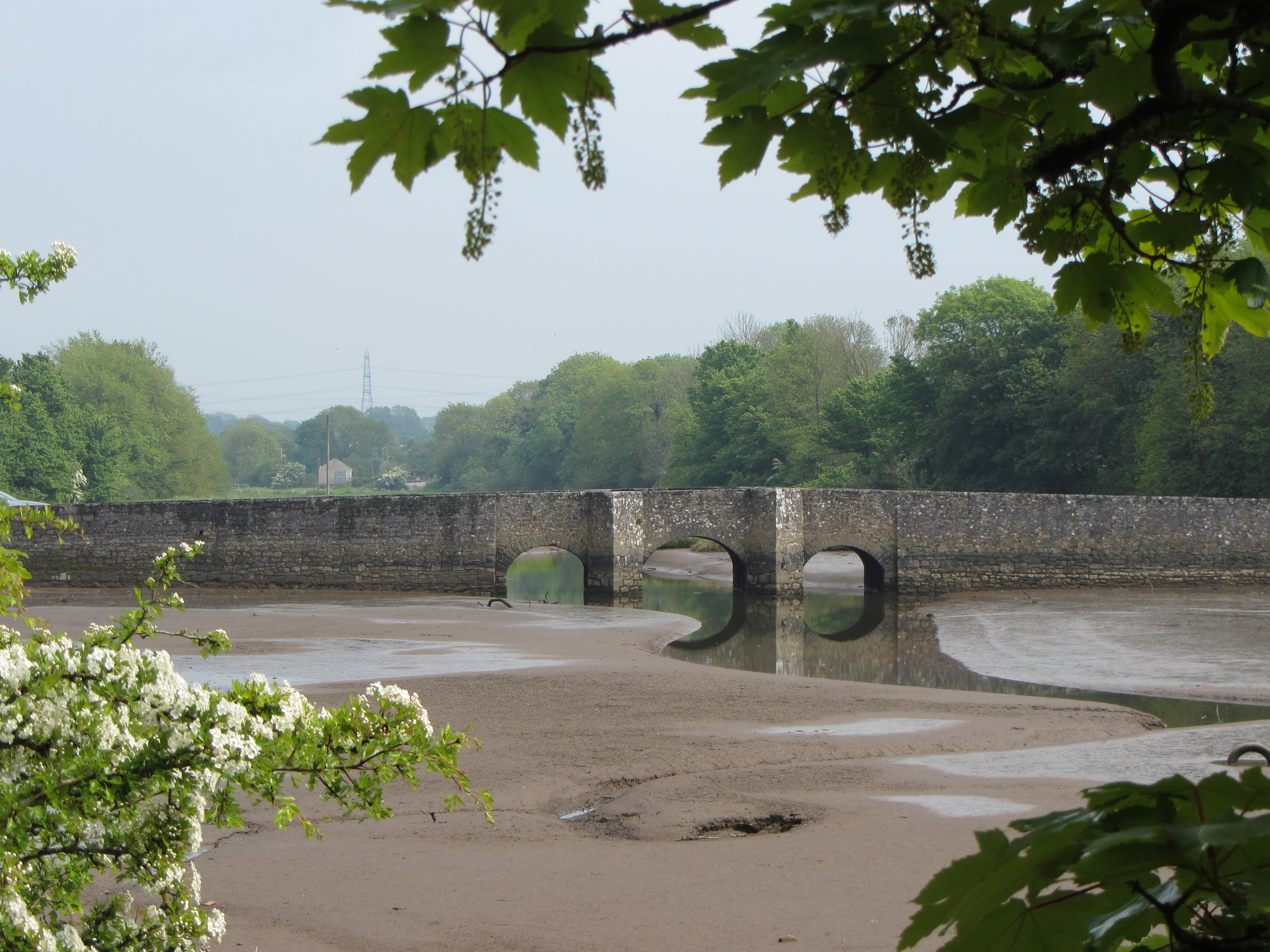
- Coordinates: 51°41′57″N 4°49′36″W
- Carries: Motor vehicles, pedestrians and bicycles
- Crosses: Carew River
- Locale: Carew, Wales
- Maintained by: Pembrokeshire County Council

Characteristics
- Design: Arch bridge
- Width: 4.5 m (15 ft)

Statistics
- Toll: Free

Listed Building – Grade II*
- Official name: Carew Bridge
- Designated: 14 May 1970
- Reference no.: 5939

Location
- Interactive map of Carew Bridge

Carew Bridge is a bridge and causeway that carries the A4075 road across the Carew River in Carew, Wales, England. A causeway either side rises to a central humpback bridge with three segmental arches, the centre one higher than those either side, with cutwaters between the arches guiding the river to pass through.

== History ==
A bridge is likely to have existed in this location since the construction of the nearby 11th century Carew Castle. The present structure is believed to date back to the 18th century, with evidence of a bond to keep the bridge in repair from 1730. An 1820 picture of Carew Castle shows the bridge in the foreground with the same triple arches present in today's bridge, albeit appearing much higher than the surrounding causeways leading to and from the bridge as compared to the present day. Part of the north causeway was rebuilt in 1938.

The bridge was designated a grade II* listed building in May 1970 due to its value as a "as a fine early bridge which forms a valuable feature of the landscape" as well as its presence nearby the castle and the tidal mill.

== Present day ==
Today the bridge carries the Canaston Bridge to Pembroke A4075 road across the Carew River. Owing to the narrow width of the bridge (approximately 4.5 metres), traffic must pass single-file over the bridge with northbound traffic required to give way to oncoming vehicles before the bridge.

The A4075 acts as an alternative route between south and north Pembrokeshire when the Cleddau Bridge is closed, which can lead to heavy congestion at Carew Bridge and temporary traffic control being implemented. Carew Bridge itself is occasionally impassible due to flooding.
