= St Mary's Church, Carew =

Coordinates: 51.6895°N 4.8278°W

St Mary's Church
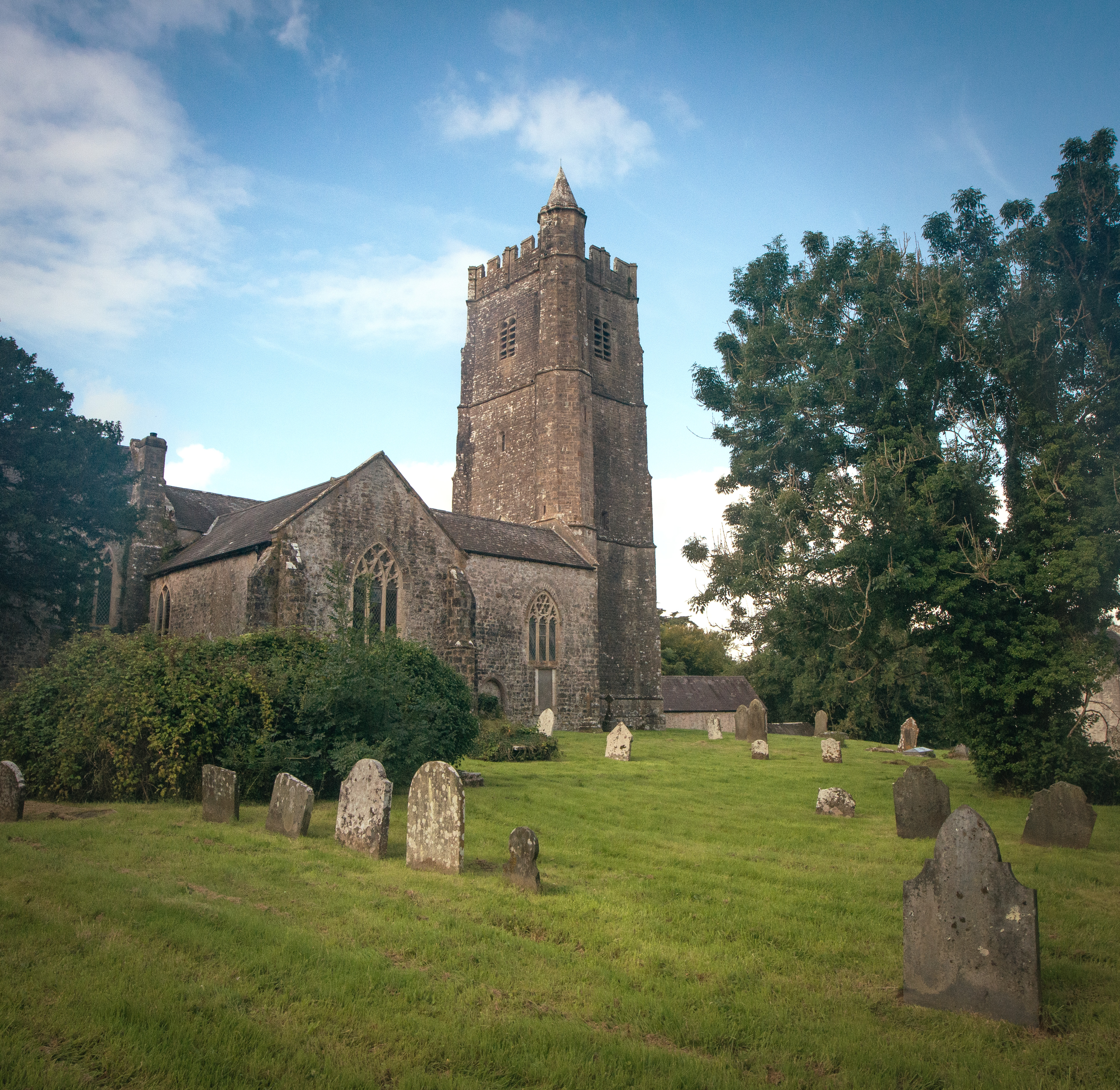

- Location in Pembrokeshire
- Country: Wales

History
- Dedication: St Mary

Architecture
- Heritage designation: Grade I
- Architectural type: Church

St Mary's Church, Carew, is the parish church of Carew, Pembrokeshire, Wales and a Grade I listed building. Lewis's Topographical Dictionary of Wales states that the church is dedicated to St John the Baptist, but the reason for this is unclear. The church is in the small village of Carew Cheriton in the southwest of the parish.

== Description ==
The oldest surviving parts of the building are the chancel and transept, dating to the 14th century. The nave, aisles and porch are 15th century, with the tower dating from about 1500. The tower has angle buttresses, uncommon in Pembrokeshire, and in 1842 was noted as having turrets (pinnacles) and a spire. The pinnacles were removed in the 19th century and the spire in the 20th century. A number of other alterations, externally and internally, were made during the 19th century, including to roofing and windows.

== Tombs and memorials ==
In the chancel are the tombs of Sir Nicholas de Carew (died 1311, who built the Edwardian castle) and Sir John and Elizabeth Carew. There are memorials to members of the Allen and other leading families. The west window is an 1857 Crimea memorial.

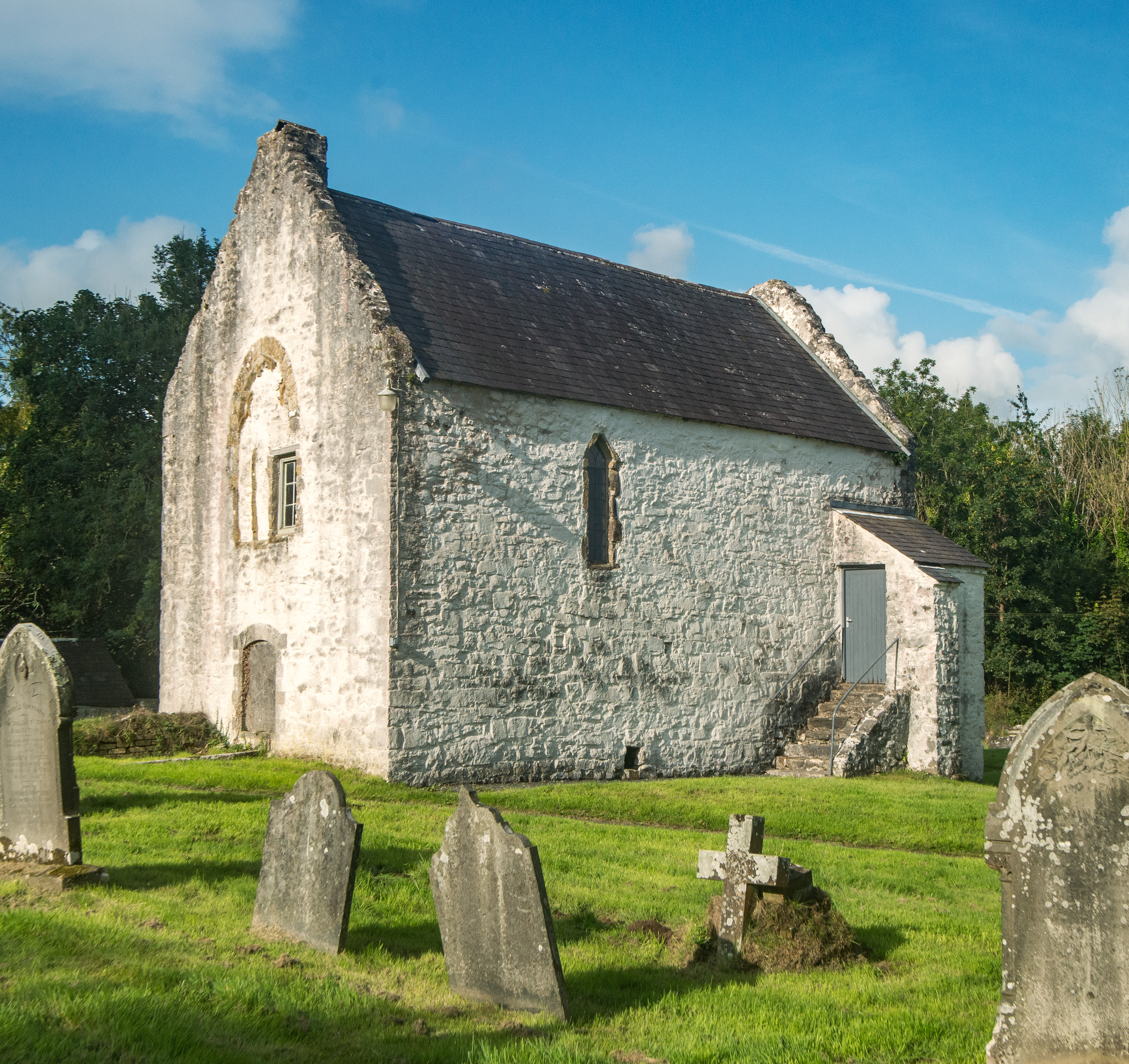
Old Mortuary Chapel

In the churchyard is the Old Mortuary Chapel, also Grade I listed. Originally a charnel house, a repository for bones, with a chapel on the upper floor, it was later used as a school.
