= Old Mortuary Chapel, Carew =

Chapel in Carew, Wales

Old Mortuary Chapel
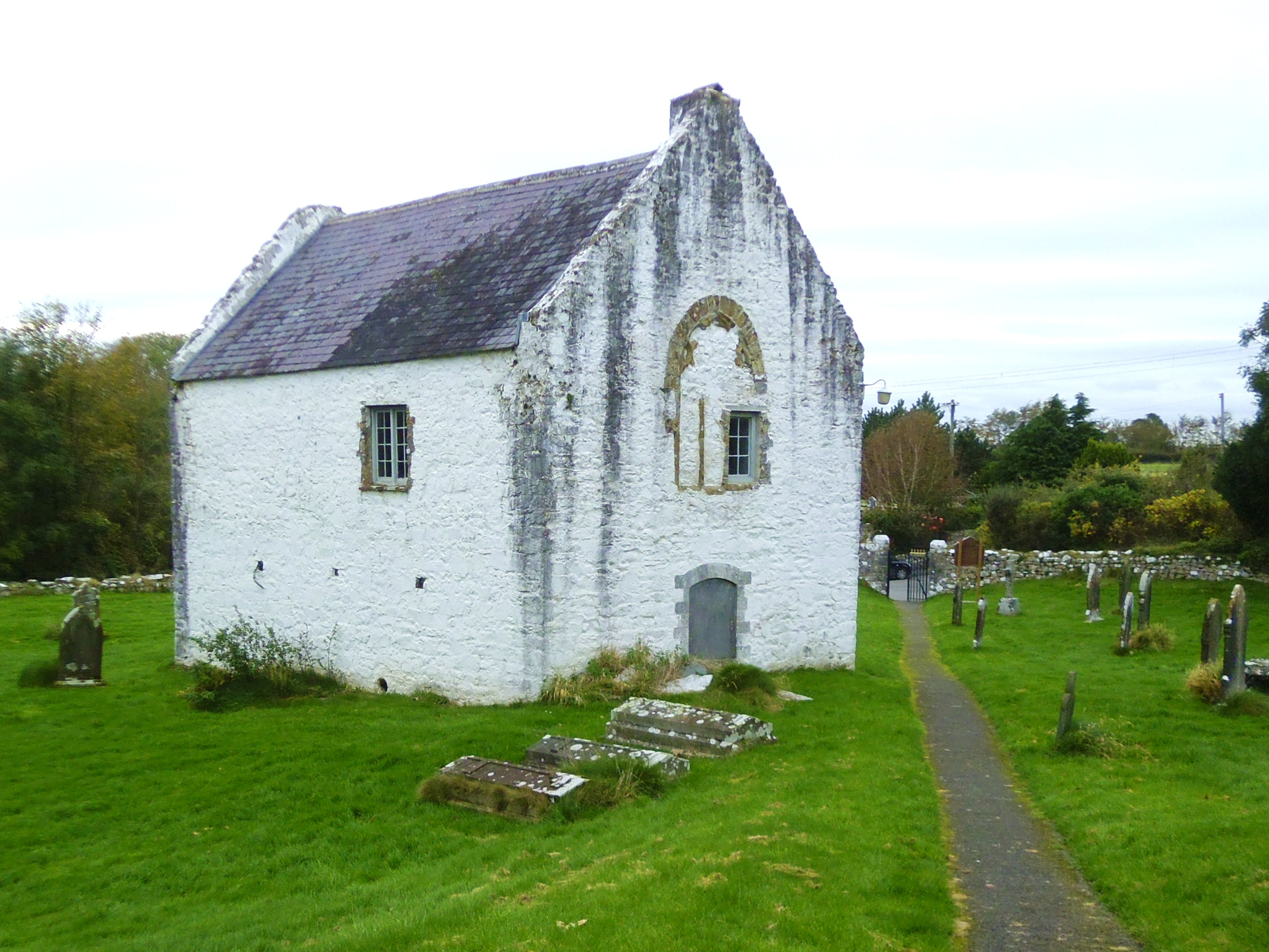
- The Chapel in St Mary's Churchyard, Carew

- Location within Pembrokeshire

Religion
- Affiliation: Christianity
- Patron: St Mary

Location
- Location: Carew, Pembrokeshire, Wales
- Coordinates: 51.6895°N 4.8278°W

Architecture
- Completed: 14th-15th century
- Listed Building – Grade I
- Official name: Old Mortuary Chapel
- Designated: 14 May 1970
- Reference no.: 5945

Old Mortuary Chapel is a medieval Grade I listed building in St Mary's churchyard, Carew, Pembrokeshire, Wales.

== Structure ==
The building has two storeys under a slate roof, is oriented east–west, and is built from limestone rubble. It is accessed by external steps. It has a vaulted undercroft.

== Monument ==
There is an exterior monument to John Relly, an early Calvinist Methodist leader who died in 1777.

== Uses ==
The undercroft dates from the 14th or 15th century, and may have been an ossiary. In 1625 the building was referred to as a schoolhouse, and was used for this purpose until 1872. In 1833, the school educated 50 pupils, and 70 attended Sunday School. In 1846 it became a national school with up to 116 children until the village school opened in 1872. The building may have been used as a mortuary chapel, and is known by that name. After 1872, the building, which has a large blocked-up window, was used as a committee room, store and as a residence, housing paupers as late as about 1840. The building has been locally known as "The Oratory". Its current use is as a parish meeting room and Sunday School. S. Lewis, in 1833, describes the building:

In the churchyard is an ancient building, apparently coeval with the church, which is occasionally used as a parochial school, the master being appointed by the vicar.
