= Carew, Pembrokeshire =

Village, parish and community in Pembrokeshire, Wales

Carew: Welsh: Caeriw
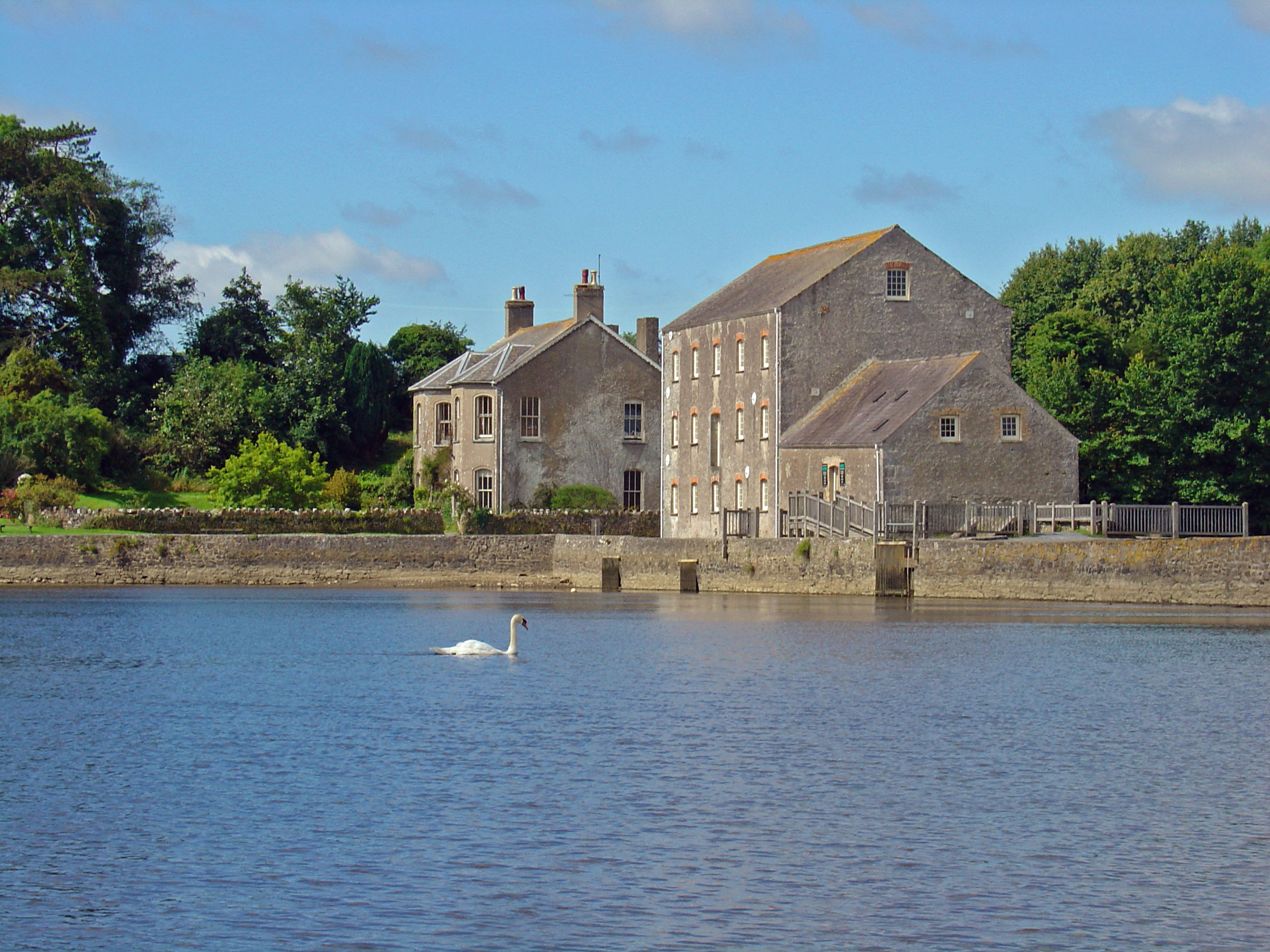
- The French Mill

- Location within Pembrokeshire
- Population: 1,532 (2011)
- OS grid reference: SN045038
  - Cardiff: 72 mi (116 km)
- Community: Carew
- Principal area: Pembrokeshire
- Country: Wales
- Sovereign state: United Kingdom
- Post town: KILGETTY
- Postcode district: SA68
- Post town: TENBY
- Postcode district: SA70
- Dialling code: 01646
- Police: Dyfed-Powys
- Fire: Mid and West Wales
- Ambulance: Welsh
- UK Parliament: Mid and South Pembrokeshire
- Senedd Cymru – Welsh Parliament: Ceredigion Penfro
- List of places UK Wales Pembrokeshire 51°41′54″N 4°49′48″W Map of the community

Carew (Welsh: Caeriw) is a village, parish and community on an inlet of Milford Haven in the former Hundred of Narberth, Pembrokeshire, West Wales, 4 miles (6.4 km) east of Pembroke. The eastern part of the parish is in the Pembrokeshire Coast National Park.

== Description ==
The meaning of the name is unclear. In Welsh it could mean "fort on a hill" (Caer-rhiw), "fort by yews" (Caer-yw) or simply "forts" (Caerau). The village grew up to serve the nearby Norman castle. The parish includes several other villages and hamlets, including Carew Cheriton (around the parish church), Carew Newton, Milton, West Williamston, Sageston and Whitehill.

Textile mills gave Milton its name. In the 19th century, there was a carding mill downstream, a weaving mill by the bridge, and a fulling mill upstream.

West Williamston had an industrial history: limestone was quarried in the area for centuries; stone was cut from slot-shaped flooded quarries communicating with the haven, known locally as "docks". See examples at 51°42′29″N 4°50′35″W. These allowed stone to be dropped from the quarry faces directly into barges at the bottom. From there, stone was shipped to lime kilns all around the coast of North Pembrokeshire and Cardiganshire. A small quarry still operates north of Carew village. Besides limestone, anthracite was mined on a small scale for local consumption at Minnis Pit on the northeastern edge of the parish.

Typical of South Pembrokeshire, the parish has been predominantly English-speaking since the 12th century.

== Governance ==
The village has its own elected community council and gives its name to an electoral ward of Pembrokeshire County Council.

== Architectural heritage ==
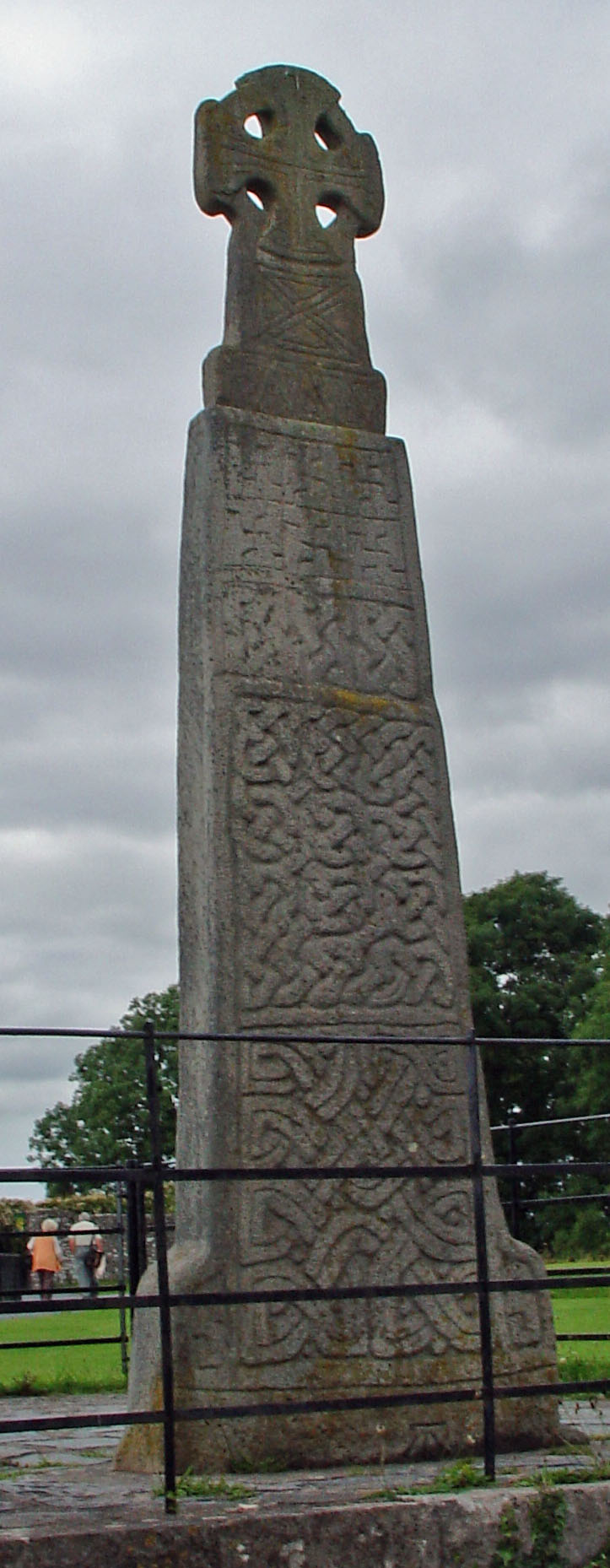
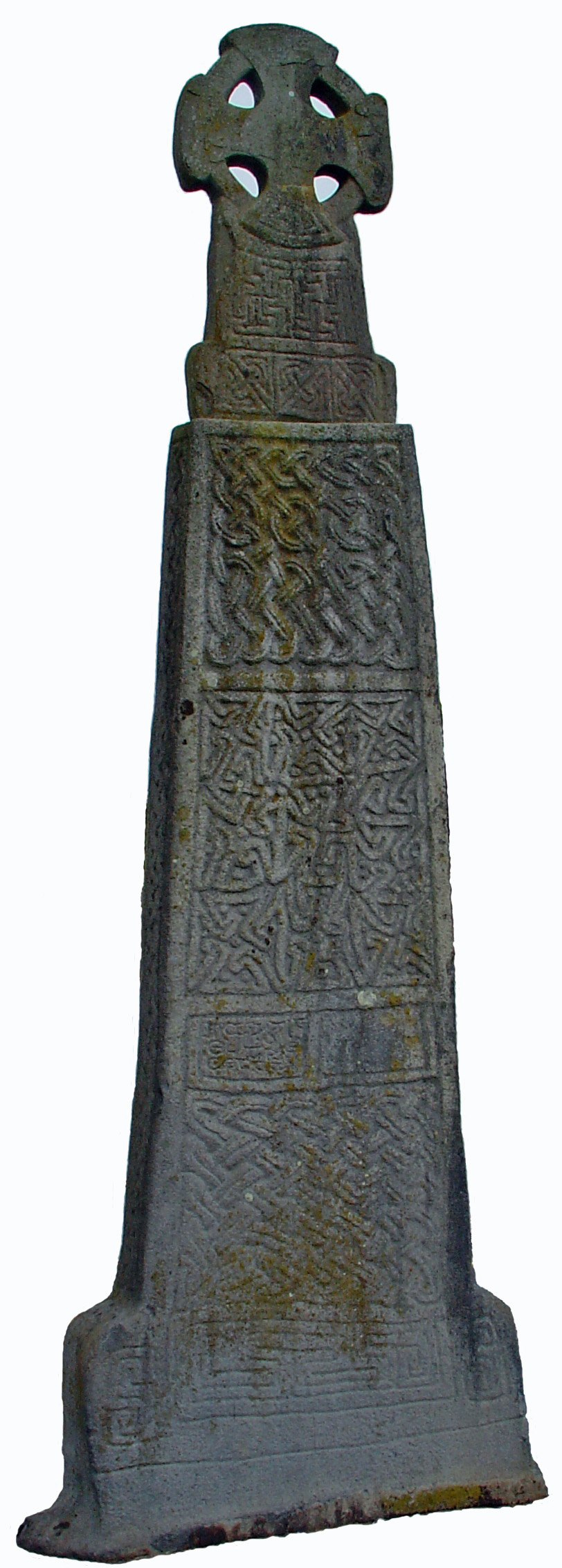
The Carew High Cross east face (left) and west face (right)

The 13th century Norman castle is 170 metres (560 ft) west of the village. Carew Cross is at the roadside in the village, and is an important example of an 11th-century memorial Celtic cross, commemorating King Maredudd ab Edwin of Deheubarth (died 1035). The cross, 4 metres (13 ft) tall, is made from the local limestone. Similar to the Nevern cross, it consists of two parts, connected with a tenon joint. It is possibly inscribed, on the west face:

MARGIT
EUT.RE
X.ETG.FILIUS

The parish church of St Mary is a Grade I listed building, dating from the 14th century. In the churchyard is the Old Mortuary Chapel, also Grade I listed.

The French Mill is a rare example of a tidal flour mill on a dam across the Carew inlet. The present building dates from the 18th century, but the French Mill was mentioned in 1476. The mill has not functioned since the 1930s, but its equipment is all still in place. It has two large undershot water wheels, driving seven sets of mill stones.

Carew Methodist Church, also known as Carew Wesley, is a listed building with Grade II* status, according to Historic England. The building, originally a Wesleyan chapel, is located on Chapel Road in Carew.

A number of other structures in Carew are noted by Coflein, including cottages and the bridge.

== Sport ==
In 2017, Carew Cricket Club controversially declared in their final match against local rivals Cresselly to win the Pembroke County Cricket Club championship. Carew were subsequently demoted to a lower division as PCCC decided that they had not broken the rules but had not played within the spirit of cricket.

== See also ==
Carew (surname)
