= Flour dresser =

Mechanical device used in grain mills for bolting

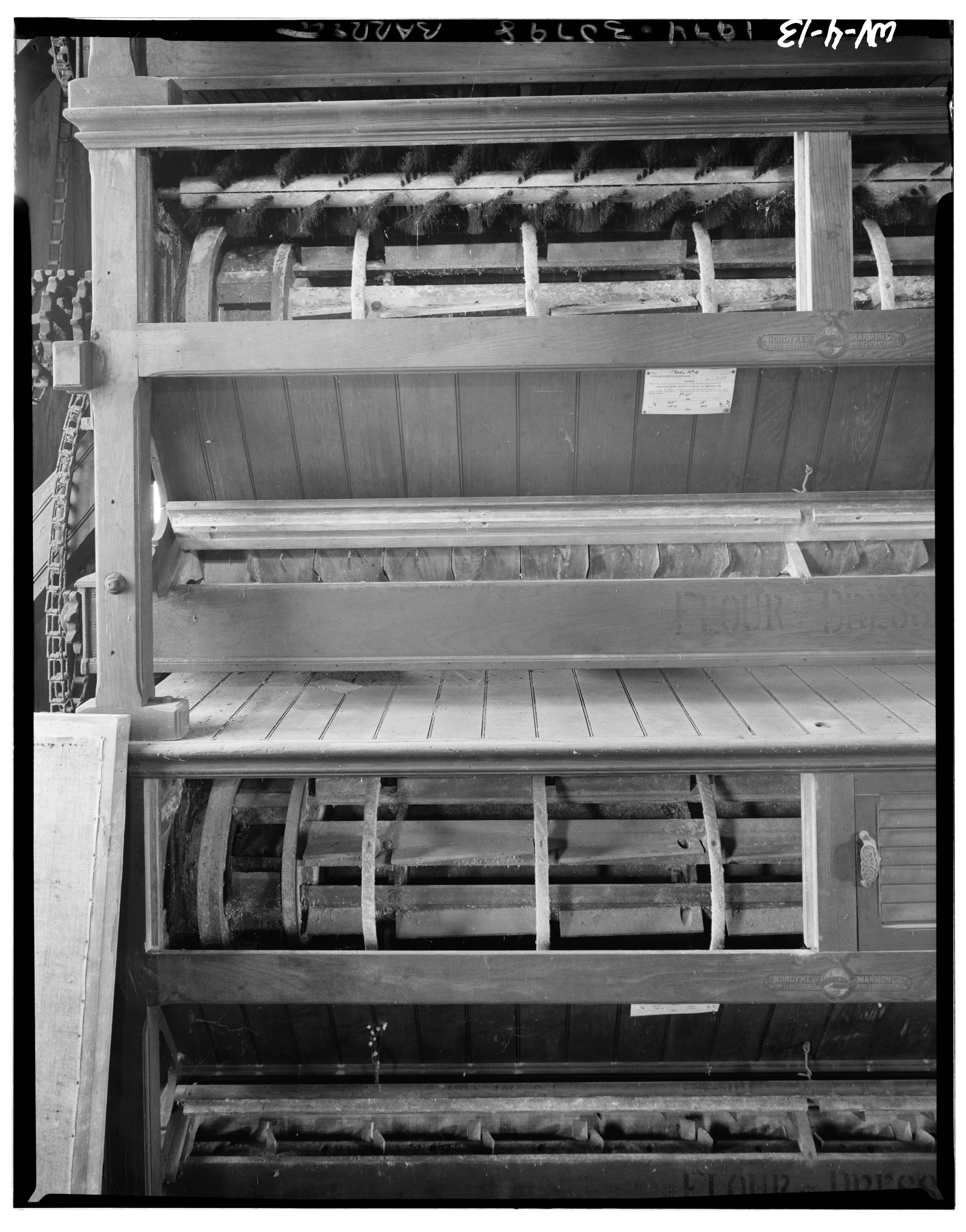
Flour dressers open showing reels for separation and cleaning brushes, Easton Roller Mill, West Virginia, U.S.

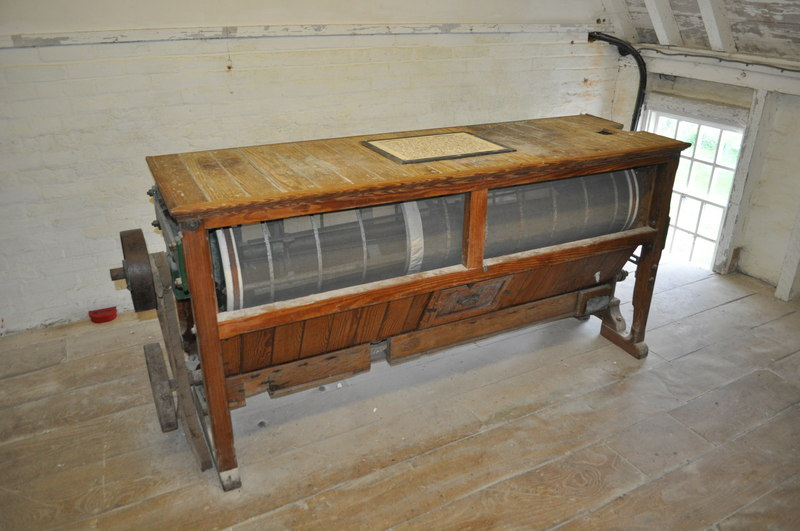
A flour dresser in the Pakenham Windmill, 2010

A flour dresser is a mechanical device used in grain mills for bolting or flour extraction, which is the process of separating the finished flour from the other grain components by sifting following milling. The milling of grain into flour has been termed the oldest continuously-conducted industry in the world. Flour dressers appear in water-powered mills in the United Kingdom dating to the 17th century, and their use continued into the 20th century in the UK and other countries as the grain-milling industry converted from water power to steam and other forms of power to drive mill machinery.

== Processing milled grain ==
Grain to be processed into flour is first ground, typically in one or more steps, then the bran is separated from the flour produced by grinding the grain. The flour produced from the grain is further separated by size through sifting (or bolting). A centrifugal reel or flour dresser is used to perform this separation, producing the finished flour and a number of byproducts, such as bran and dust. A centrifugal reel is a cylinder around which a cloth filter is stretched. Inside of the cloth-covered cylinder are beaters which stir and toss the ground grain against the cloth. A brush moving across the outside of the cylinder removes the flour and keeps the cloth functioning. A flour dresser is constructed similarly to the centrifugal reel, but lacks the beaters. A typical mill process involves passing the flour coming off the millstones through successive dressers so as to achieve the desired separation of flour from bran and germ components of the grain.

=== Bolting cloth ===
Bolting cloth is a fabric that is fine, stiff, and transparent. It is typically made of silk. The cloth was primarily used for sifting purposes. The structure of the bolting cloth is stiffer and closer than voile fabric. Mesh is classified into four different grades. Bolting cloth was also used in stencil making, and in dress trimmings.

== Historical development of the flour dresser ==
Separating the bran and other parts of the grain from the desired flour is a difficult and time-consuming process to carry out manually. Evidence of efforts to automate the process are documented in patent applications. Edmund Brunt filed a provisional patent for a 'bolting machine' in 1614. John Milne patented a machine in 1765 which used several grades of wire mesh or cloth to separate flour from bran. A machine for manufacturing bolting cloth, used to filter the flour from bran and other parts of the grain, was patented in 1783 by Benjamin Blackmore. And in 1850, James Bell devised a means of separating flour by pushing the feedstock (or 'stock') against a vertical cloth ('bolting sleeve') while Joseph Foot patented a means of making the filter sleeve from silk instead of wool. Development continued into the 19th and 20th centuries, increasing the speed and efficiency of the process through improvements such as the addition of beaters and brushes to force the fine flour through the filters and to continuously clean the filters as they rotated.

== See also ==
- Carew Tidal Mill
- Pakenham Windmill
- Glossary of mill machinery
