= Katerina Keyru =

Russian basketball player

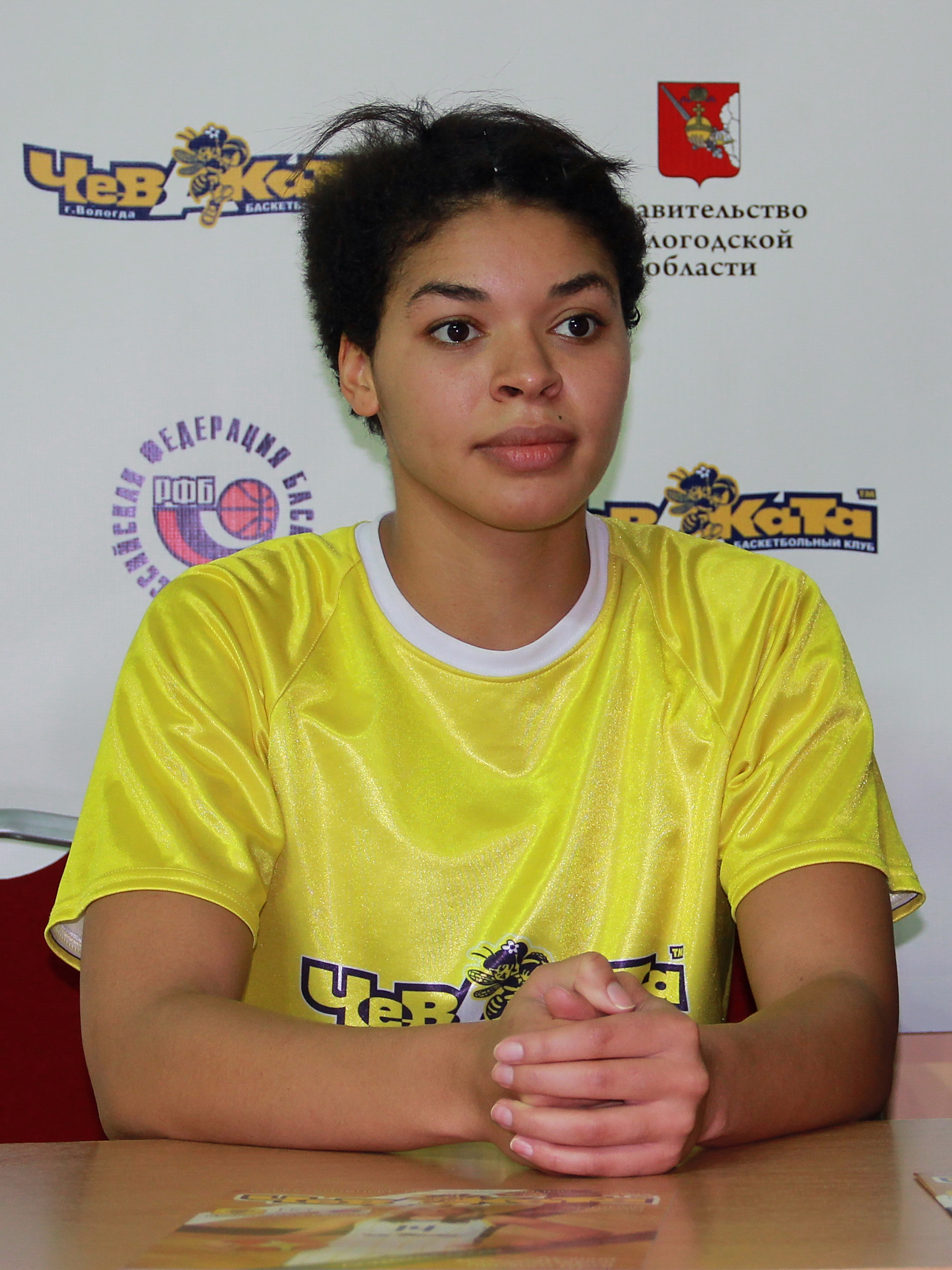
- Keyru in 2013

Personal information
- Native name: Катерина Кейру
- Born: Katerina Johnovna Keyru; 4 December 1988 (age 37) Rostov-on-Don, Russian SFSR, Soviet Union
- Height: 182 cm (6 ft 0 in)
- Weight: 70 kg (154 lb)

Sport
- Sport: Basketball
- Club: Dynamo Moscow (2008–10); WBC Spartak Saint Petersburg (2010–11); Chevakata Vologda (2011–12); Nadezhda Orenburg (2012–13); Chevakata Vologda (2013–14); Dynamo Moscow (2014–)

Katerina Johnovna Keyru (Russian: Катерина Джоновна Кейру; later Novoseltseva, Russian: Новосельцева; born 4 December 1988) is a Russian basketball shooting guard. She was part of the Russian team that won the 2008 European junior championships.

Keyru was born to John Carew, an Olympic sprint runner from Sierra Leone, who in 1976 came to study in Rostov and married there. She has three brothers: Olah, Willy and Victor. Olah is an actor, Willy is a singer, and Victor is an international basketball player. Katerina took up basketball aged 7 following her brothers. In 2015, she married the Russian football player Ivan Novoseltsev, who proposed her after an official football match, in front of the crowd.
