= Carew Tidal Mill =

Corn mill in Pembrokeshire, Wales

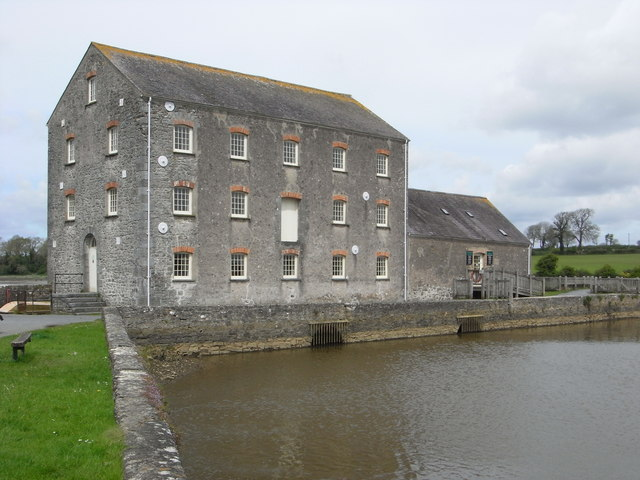
- Mill from the east on 3 May 2009

- Location within Pembrokeshire
- Built: c. 1801
- Location: Carew, Pembrokeshire, Wales
- Coordinates: 51°41′56″N 4°50′07″W
- Industry: Corn Milling
- Products: Flour

Carew Tidal Mill (Welsh: Melin Caeriw), also called the French Mill, is a corn mill in Pembrokeshire, Wales, powered by tidal water. It was built around 1801 just west of Carew Castle, and replaced a much older mill in the same location. The mill pond fills through open flood gates as the tide comes in. The gates are closed at high tide, and the pond drains through sluices under the mill as the tide falls, driving two undershot water wheels. It is the only intact mill of this type in Wales. It was abandoned in 1937, was restored in 1972, and now houses a museum.

== Location ==
Carew Tidal Mill stands on the south end of a 150 metres (490 ft) long causeway across the Carew River, a tidal inlet east of Milford Haven. Carew Castle, built in 1270, is 300 metres (980 ft) to the east. The site of the now ruined castle was occupied by a fort in the Iron Age, and much later by an earth and wood fort built around 1100 by Gerald de Windsor, a Norman. The castle was in turn a military stronghold and a comfortable Elizabethan mansion.

A much older mill, which may have been built in the same period as the castle, used to stand at this location. The older mill may have been powered by a leat that ran from the river before the causeway dam was built to create the large tidal mill pond. There are records of the former mill from 1541. The Ministers' Accounts prepared for Henry VIII (r. 1509–47) mention "two mills under one roof called le french mills". The name may derive from the millstones, which were made of French burr stone. John Bartlett took a lease on the mill in 1558 for a fee of 10 sovereigns annually. It was restored in 1792 after a fire.

The causeway is first mentioned in a document from 1630 that says that 15 years earlier Sir John Carew had repaired the causeway walls and floodgates. The clay core dam faced with stone encloses an 11 hectares (27 acres) mill pond. The pond is about 13 metres (43 ft) wide where the mill stands at the south end, narrowing to about 4.5 metres (15 ft) at the north end, where there is a spillway. There are floodgates in the centre of the causeway dam.

== Building ==
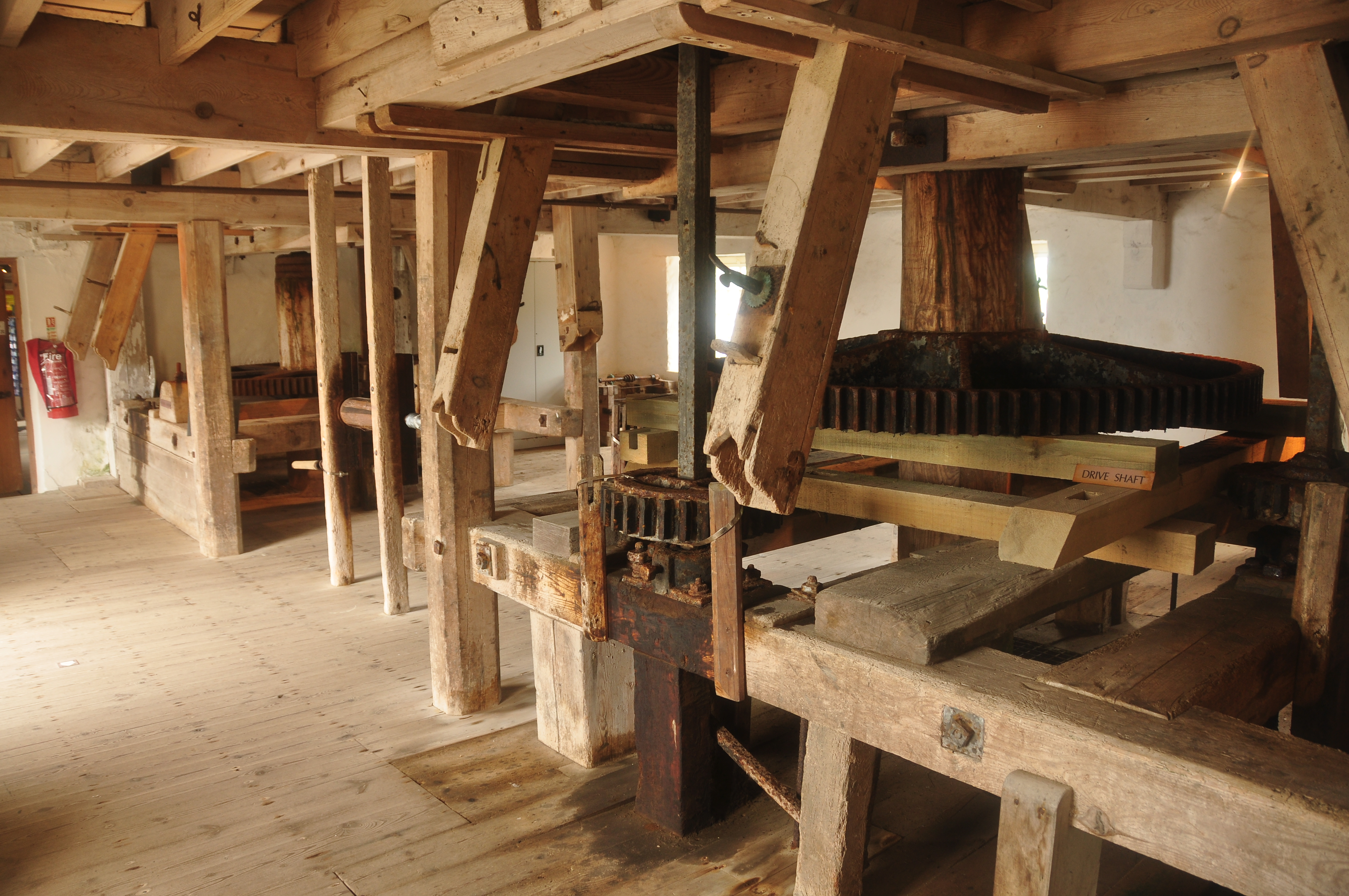
Interior

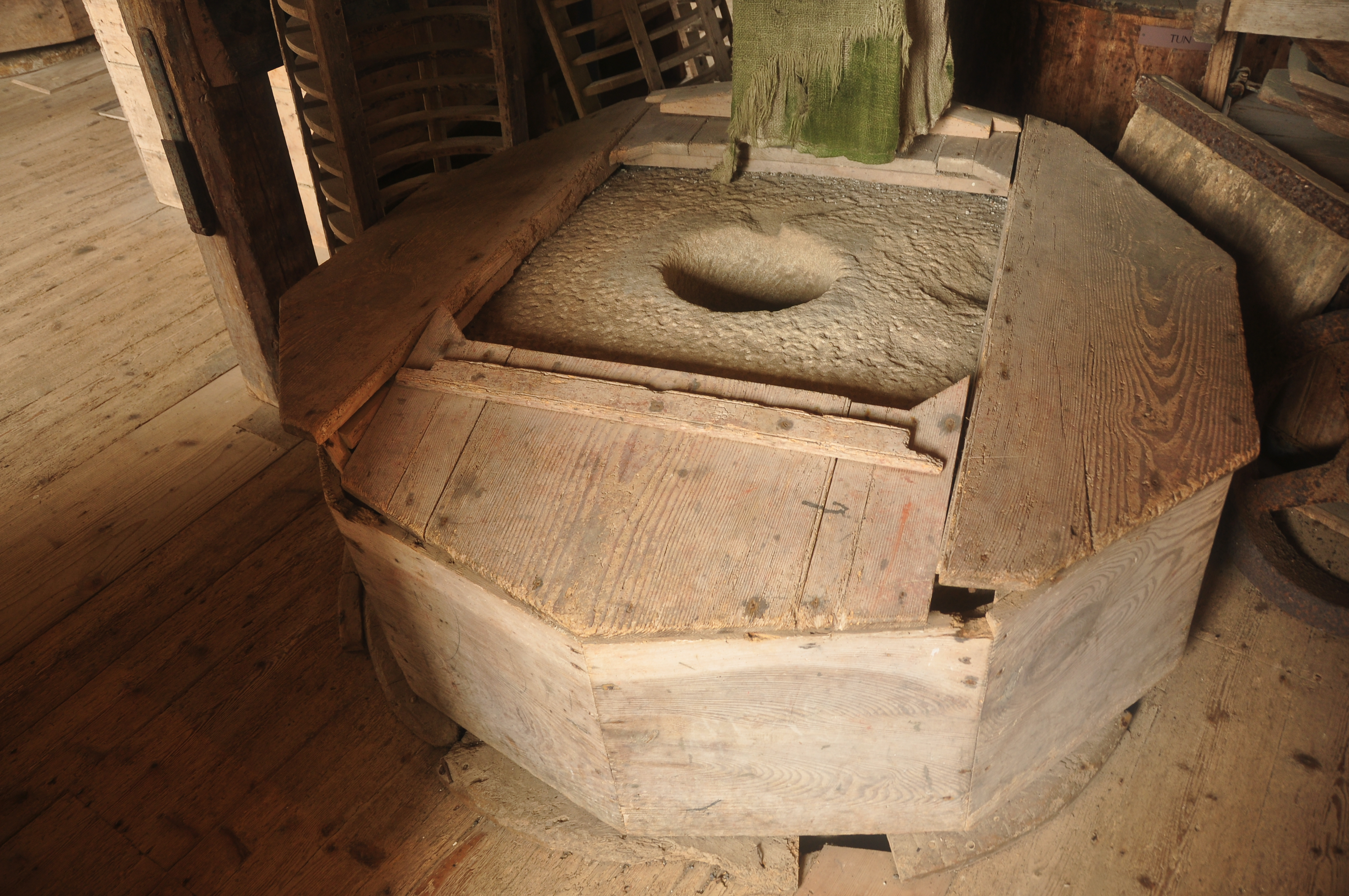
Bin

The present Carew Tidal Mill has two water wheels, one with the date of 1801, so was probably built around that time. The floodgates in the causeway dam were opened as the tide rose and filled the mill pond, then closed to contain the water in the pool when the tide began to ebb. When there was enough difference between the water levels the miller opened the sluice gates so the water would run from the pond through sluices under the mill, driving the water wheels. There are two 4.8 metres (16 ft) undershot water wheels with wooden bucket paddles. One water wheel is 1.65 metres (5 ft 5 in) wide and the other is 2.1 metres (6 ft 11 in) wide. Both have 225 millimetres (8.9 in) square shafts.

The mill is a three-storey stone building with an attic and a slate roof. The building is five bays long and two bays wide. On the ground floor there is machinery for lifting the sluice gates and for the running stones. On the stone floor above there are six pairs of millstones, three driven by one water wheel and three by the other. The stone floor also houses the machine for cleaning the grain and the flour dresser. The grain hoppers are on the bin floor above the stone floor. The miller's house adjoined the mill, which was essential since working hours were any time in the day or night when the tide began to ebb.

A sack hoist was used to lift grain to the attic, or garner floor. From there it was poured down to the winnower on the stone floor to remove chaff. The cleaned grain was then hoisted back up to the attic and poured into large storage bins on the bin floor. The grain was delivered from the bin floor through chutes to the stone floor, where it was ground to produce meal. The meal was then hoisted again and poured down to the flour dresser, which produced white flour and bran products. Grain was delivered to the mill by cart or by sailing vessels, and flour was shipped by sailing vessel.

== History ==
Pembrokeshire exported corn to other parts of Wales and England in the 17th century. Carew Tidal Mill was at first used during the Napoleonic Wars to grind corn. In the late 19th century the traditional Pembrokeshire mills faced competition from steam-powered roller mills built in the port towns to mill low-cost corn shipped from abroad. At the same time the introduction of the railway to Pembrokeshire created demand for dairy farming. The Carew mill began to grind bones for fertilizer and to grind animal feed. It was called "dilapidated" in the 1870s and was no longer used after 1937. After 1937 tie bars were installed on the south of the building to hold it together, but despite these the building became at risk of falling down. In September 1971 the mill was given a Grade II* listing.

Restoration work funded by the Historic Buildings Council of Wales, the Pembrokeshire County Council and the Pembroke Rural District Council was completed in 1972. The restoration was recognized by the Times Conservation Award Scheme. The mill was leased to the Pembrokeshire Coast National Park Authority in 1983. More renovations were undertaken in the next three years to create a reception area and milling museum inside the mill. The restorations and renovations cost around £100,000 and included major work to underpin and strengthen the structure, new windows and drainpipes, improvements to the interior, addition of a small reception area and an audiovisual room. By 1998 the machinery and south waterwheel were again operational. Carew Tidal Mill is the only tidal mill that has been restored in Wales.

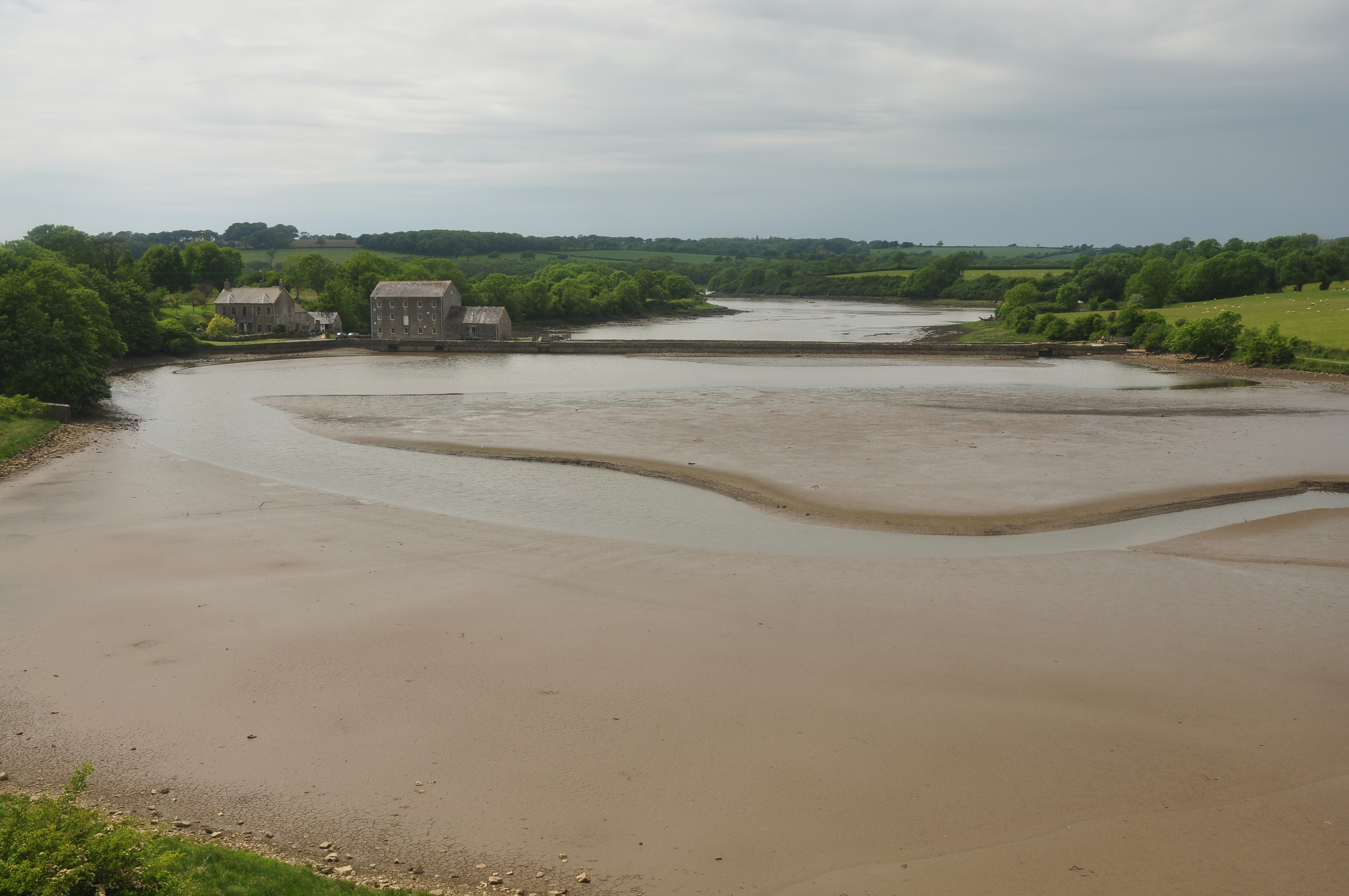
Mill and causeway dam from east end of mill pool

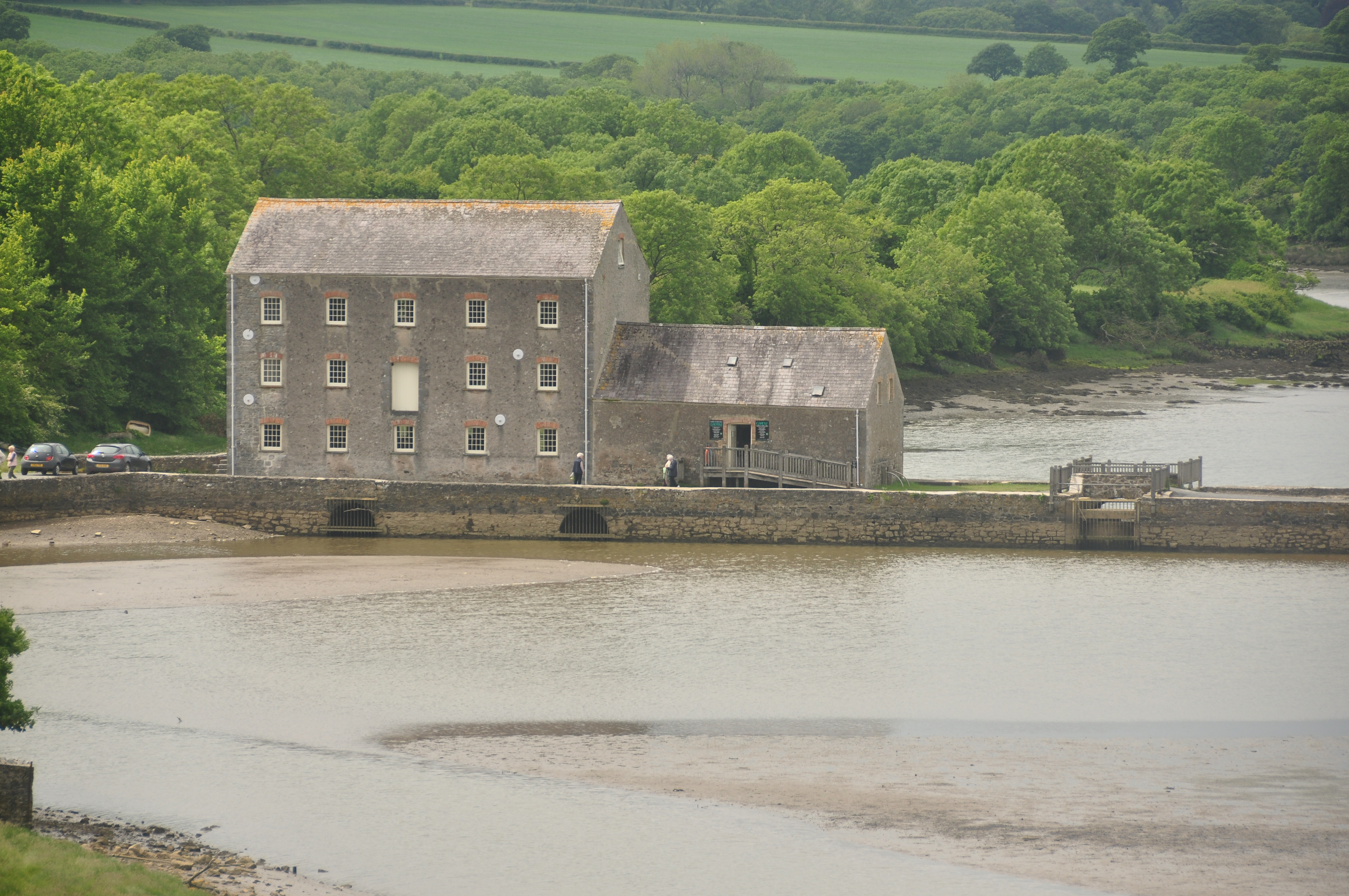
Mill from the east, flood gates to right

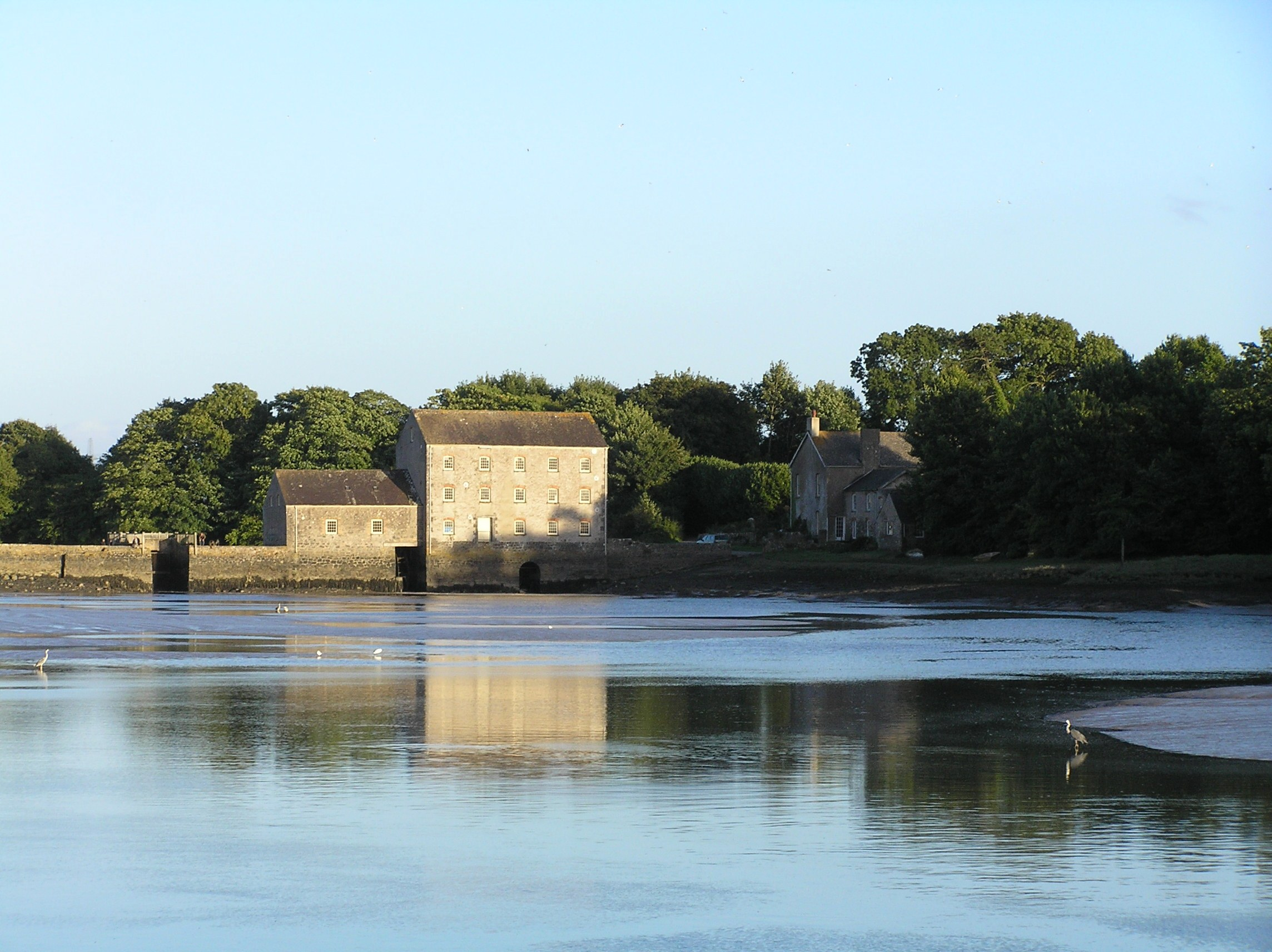
Mill from the west, from below
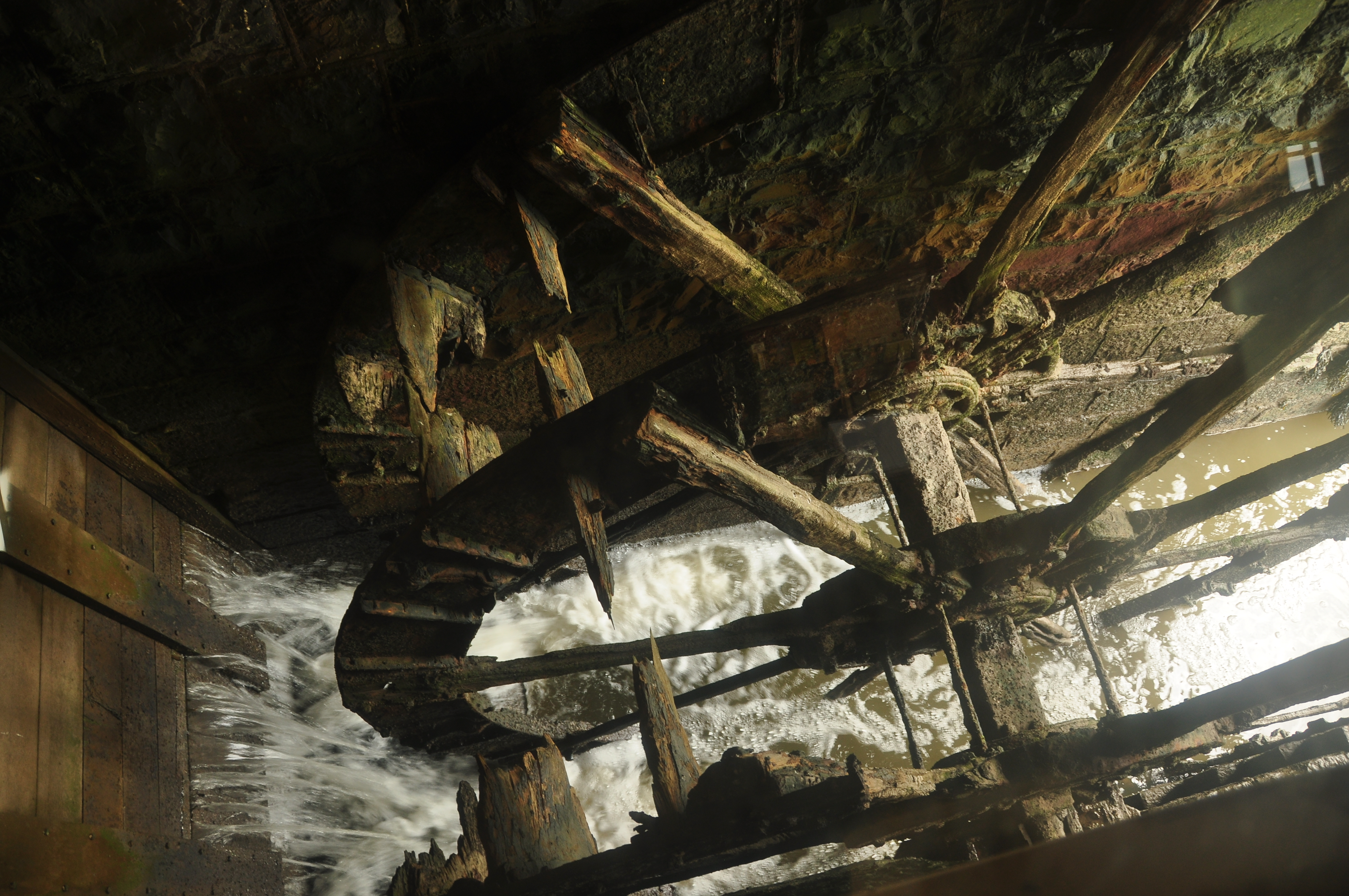
Remains of water wheel

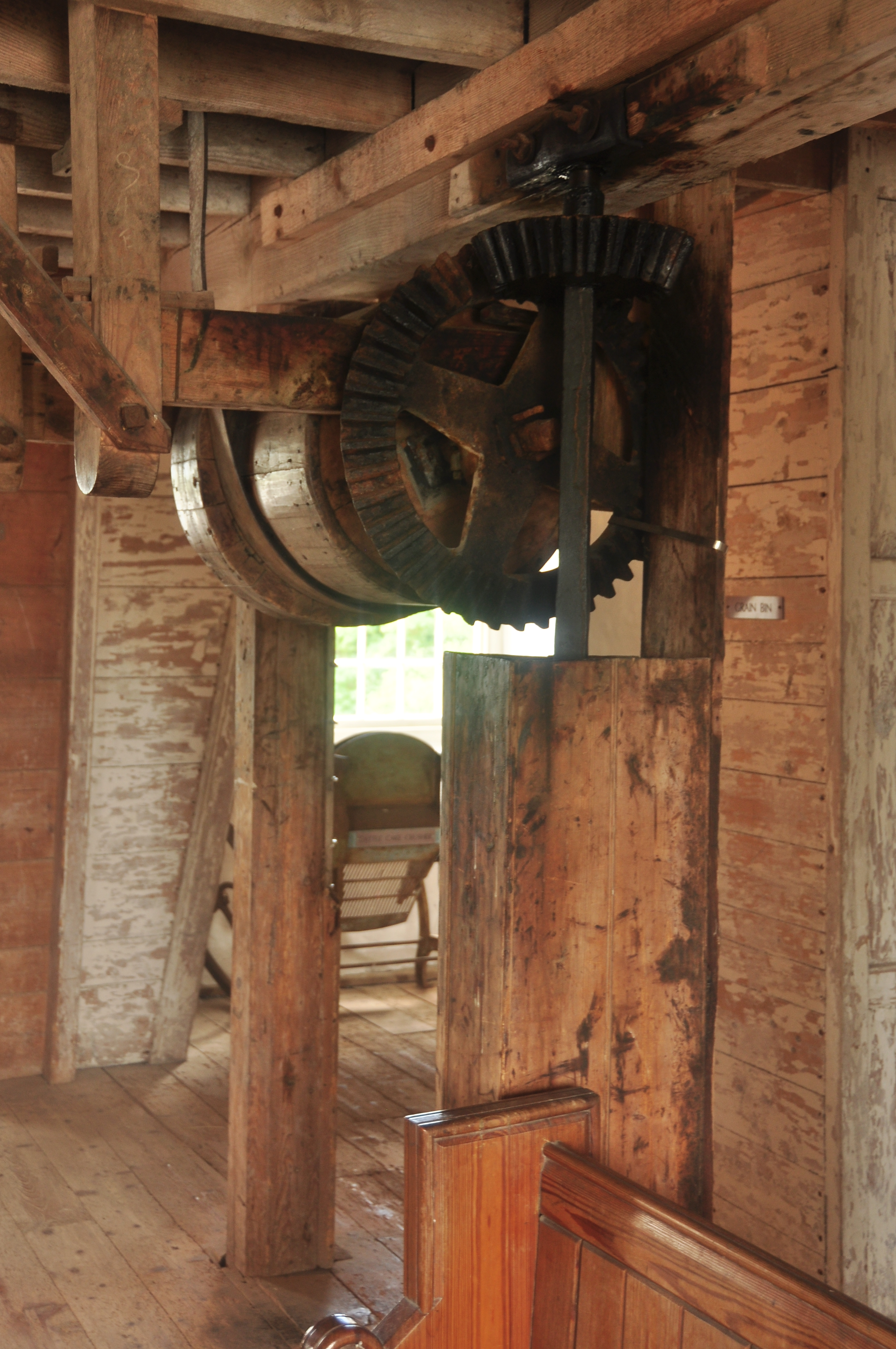
Vertical drive shaft powers horizontal drum

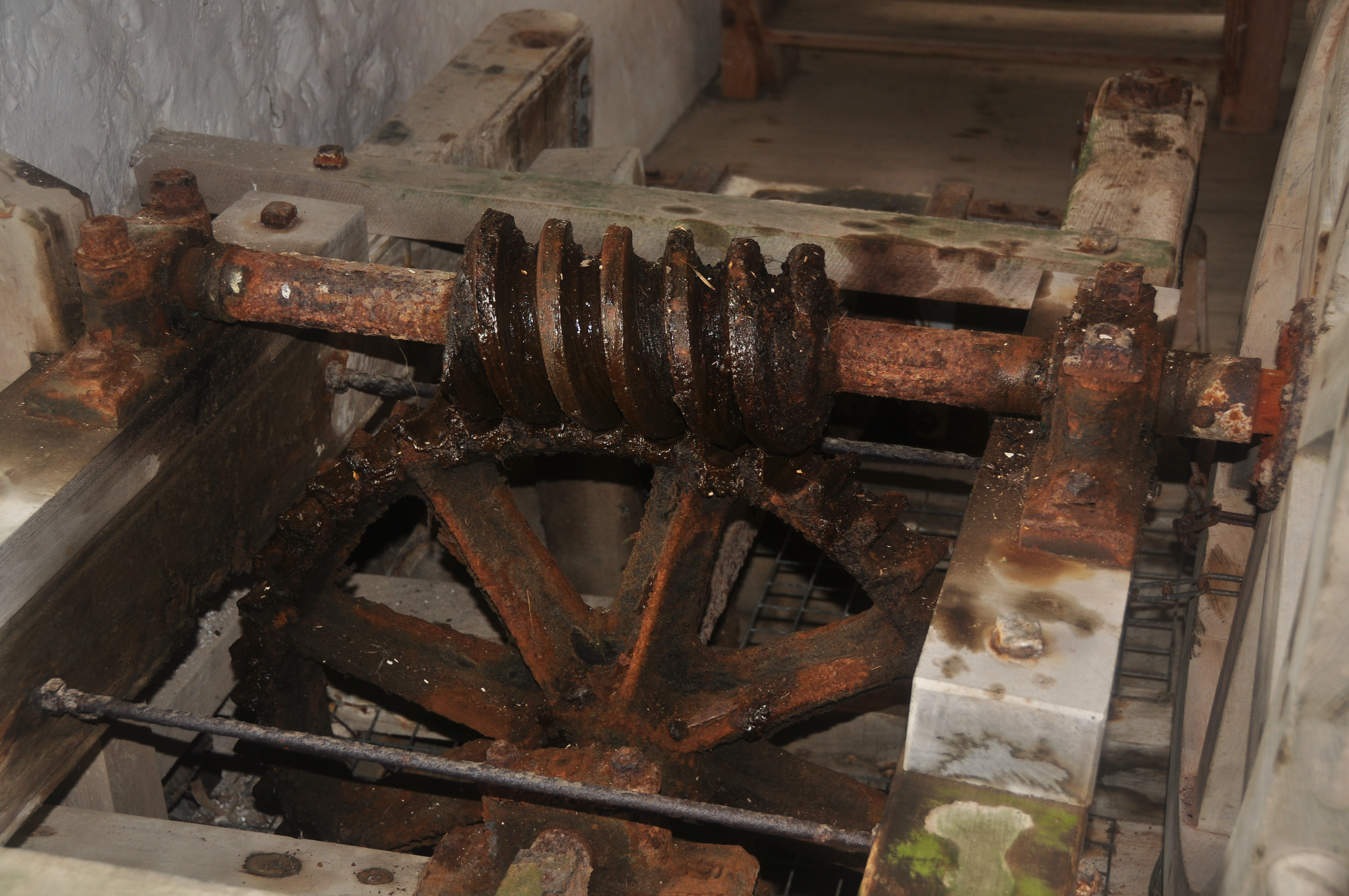
Transmission gears. The screw above powers the wheel below.

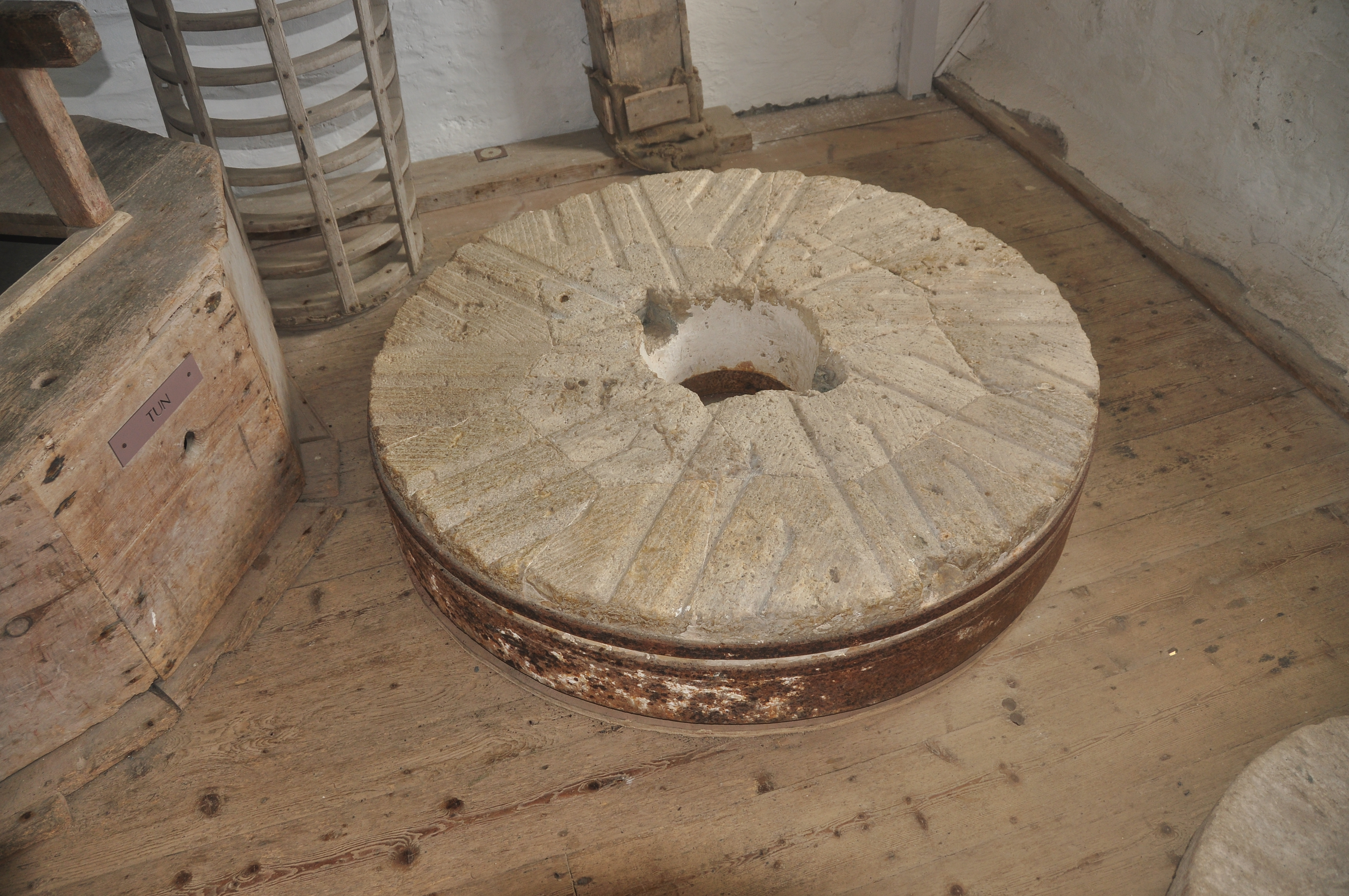
Millstone

== Sources ==
- "Carew Castle & Tidal Mill", Visit Pembrokeshire, archived from the original on 2016-04-12
- Carew Tidal Mill, Pembrokeshire Coast National Park
- Carew Tidal Mill, Welsh Mills Society, archived from the original on 2011-02-11
- ECPK (2016), "Carew Tidal Mill (French Mill)", Engineering Timelines, archived from the original on 2016-04-15
- Haskell, Tony (2006-04-07), Caring for Our Built Heritage: Conservation in Practice: a Review of Conservation Schemes Carried Out by County Councils and National Park Authorities in England and Wales in Association with District Councils and Other Agencies, Taylor & Francis, ISBN 978-1-135-82854-7
- Neaverson, Peter; Palmer, Marilyn (2012-10-12), Industrial Archaeology: Principles and Practice, Routledge, ISBN 978-1-134-70508-5
- Welcome to Carew Tidal Mill (PDF), Pembrokeshire Coast National Park, archived from the original (PDF) on 2017-12-06
