= John Carew (sprinter) =

Sierra Leonean sprinter

Personal information
- Born: 17 September 1952 (age 73)

Sport
- Sport: Athletics
- Event: Sprint

Achievements and titles
- Personal best: 100 m – 11.11 (1980)

John Carew (born 17 September 1952) is a retired sprint runner from Sierra Leone. He competed in the 100 m event at the 1980 Summer Olympics, but failed to reach the final.

In 1974 Carew came from Sierra Leone to the Soviet Union to study at the Rostov Institute of civil engineering. He married a Russian woman in 1978 in Rostov, and had four children with her: Olah, Willy, Victor and Katerina Keyru. Olah became an actor, Willy a singer, while Victor and Katerina are international basketball players. John Carew later returned to Sierra Leone, after being awarded a degree PhD in technical sciences, leaving his family in Russia.
