= Cicely Carew =

American artist (born 1982)

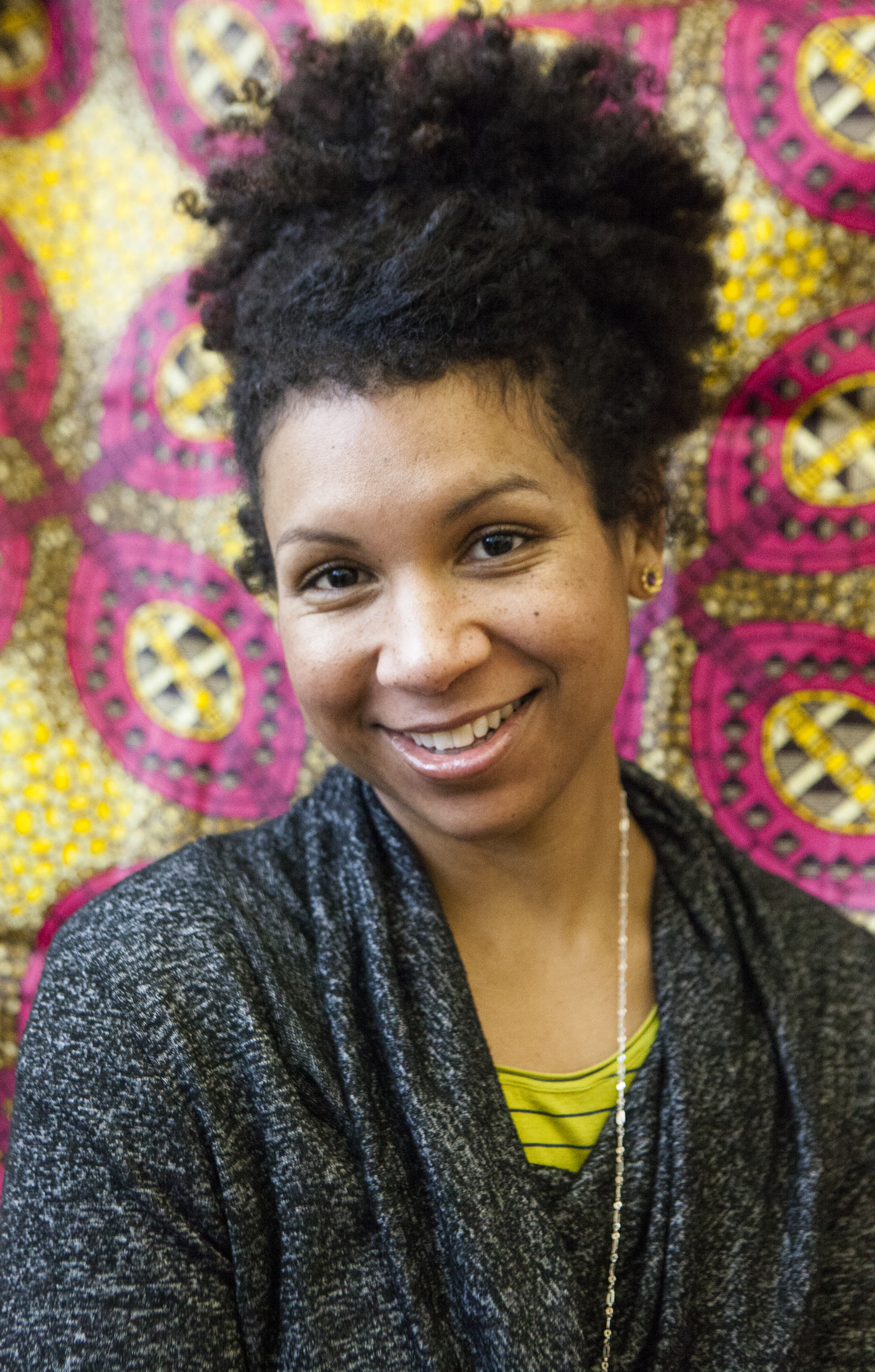
- Carew (2018; age 36)
- Born: 1982 (age 43–44); Los Angeles, California, US
- Education: Lesley University (MFA); MassArt (BFA)
- Known for: Abstract installations
- Style: Mixed media
- Website: cicelycarew.com

Cicely Carew (born 1982) is an American mixed-media artist in the Boston area. She is best known for her abstract installations located in museum galleries and public spaces.

Carew lives in Cambridge with her son and keeps a studio in Waltham.

== Influences ==
Carew is a painter, printmaker, and public artist specializing in abstract installations. She draws inspiration from Wangechi Mutu, Beatriz Milhazes, and Julie Mehretu. Her work is held in academic, corporate, and private collections, including those of Fidelity Investments, Simmons University, Northeastern University, the Federal Reserve Bank of Boston, and the Cambridge Arts Council. She has also worked on commercial projects ranging from public art for Peloton stores in New York to cover art for the Boston Art Review.

== Biography ==
In 1982, Carew was born in Los Angeles in 1982.

In 2005, Carew received her BFA from Massachusetts College of Art and Design and her MFA from Lesley University in 2020.

In 2021, Carew received the St. Botolph Club Foundation Emerging Artist Award, an Artful Seeds Fellowship, and a Sustainable Arts Foundation Award.

Carew served as the 2021–2022 artist in residence at Shady Hill School in Cambridge, Massachusetts, and taught screen printing for Lesley University.

In 2023, Carew was a recipient of the James and Audrey Foster Prize from Boston's Institute of Contemporary Art.

On October 28, 2024, the Student Government Association of Northeastern University voted to remove Carew’s "Rooted" art installation from Krentzman Quad after more than 1,870 students signed a petition arguing for its removal on the grounds that it did not fit in with the existing architecture. The art installation comprised five 15-foot (4.6 m) tall structures made of steel, aluminum mesh, and translucent plexiglass meant to resemble flowers. In describing the project, Carew explained that the goal of the art piece was to "inspire wonder and allow for enchantment". The installation was removed in April 2025.

== Exhibitions ==
- "Call & Response", Newport Art Museum, 2020
- "What They See", Trustman Art Gallery, Simmons University, Boston, 2020
- "Ambrosia", Now + There, The Prudential Center, 2021
- "Quantum Sanctuary", Fitchburg Art Museum, 2022
- "Rooted", Northeastern University, 2024
- "BeLOVEd", Fuller Craft Museum, 2025

== See also ==
- Northeastern University - Campus Development - Rooted
