= Carew Castle =

Castle in Pembrokeshire, Wales

Coordinates: 51°41′54″N 4°49′50″W

- Part of Pembrokeshire
- Carew, Wales
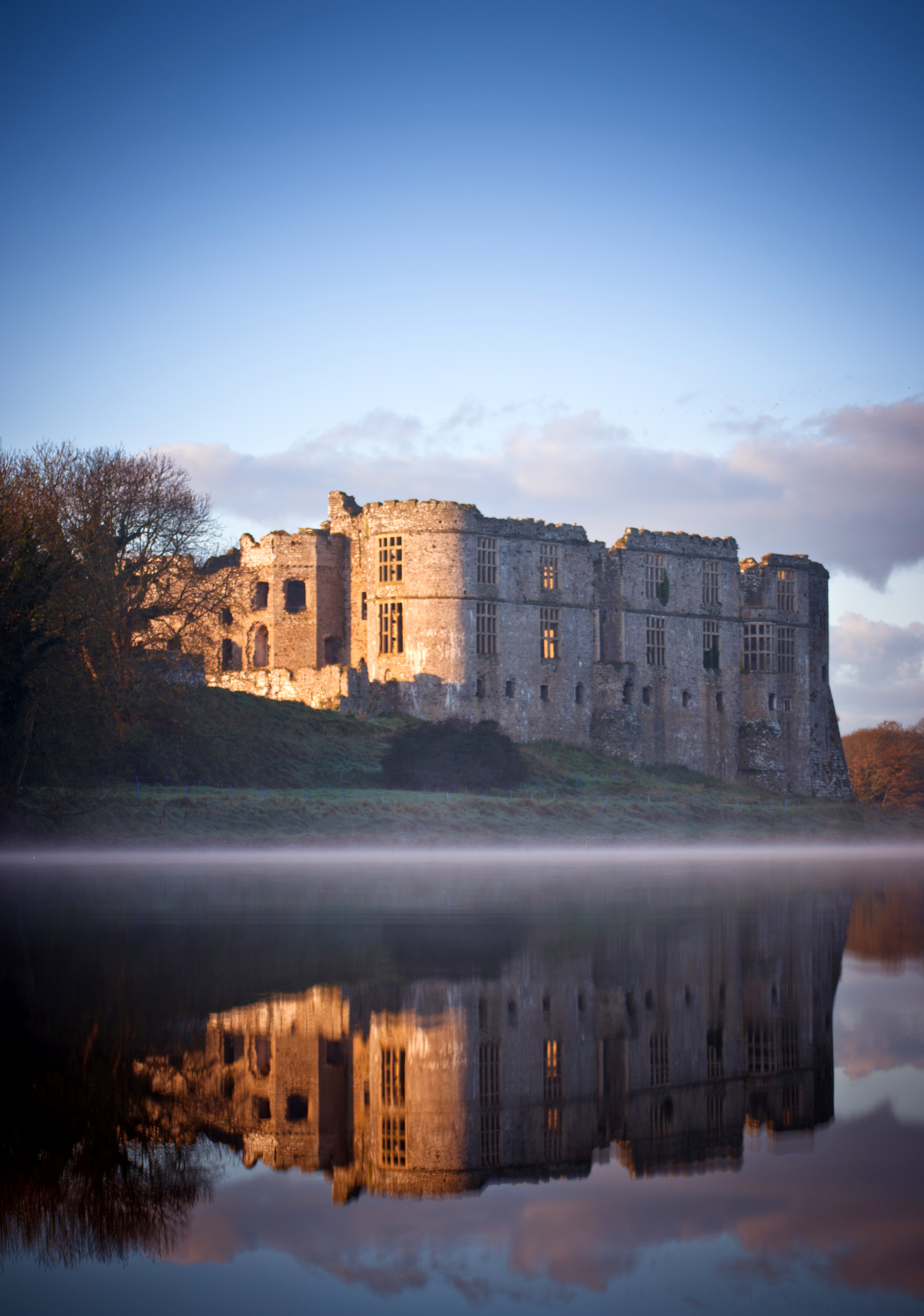
- Castle's north face, beside an inlet of the Carew River

Site information
- Type: Norman Rectangular castle with Elizabethan Ranges
- Owner: Carew family
- Controlled by: Pembrokeshire Coast National Park
- Open to the public: Yes
- Condition: Partially restored
- Website: Carew Castle & Tidal Mill

Location
- Height: Up to 15 metres (49 ft)

Site history
- Built: 1270
- Built by: Nicholas de Carew
- Materials: Carboniferous Limestone
- Battles/wars: English Civil War

Listed Building – Grade I
- Designated: 14 May 1970

Carew Castle (Welsh: Castell Caeriw) is a castle in the civil parish of Carew in Pembrokeshire, Wales. The Carew family take their name from this site and have owned the castle for more than 900 years. It is leased to the Pembrokeshire Coast National Park for administration purposes.

== Construction ==
The present castle, which replaced an earlier stone keep, is constructed almost entirely from the local Carboniferous limestone, except for some of the Tudor architectural features such as window frames, which are made from imported Cotswold stone. Although originally a Norman stronghold the castle maintains a mixture of architectural styles as modifications were made to the structure over successive centuries.

Entry to the inner ward is across a dry moat that had a barbican and gatehouse. The front of the castle had three D-shaped towers and crenelated walls. The rear of the castle has two large round towers. In the 16th century the northern defensive wall was converted into a Tudor range with ornate windows and long gallery.

The outer ward has earthworks that were built by Royalist defenders during the English Civil War in the 1640s.

== History ==
The use of the site for military purposes extends back at least 2000 years.

=== Early history ===
The castle stands on a limestone bluff overlooking the Carew inlet, part of the tidal estuary that makes up the Milford Haven Waterway. The site must have been recognised as strategically useful from the earliest times, and recent excavations in the outer ward have discovered multiple defensive walls of an Iron Age fort.

The Norman castle has its origins in a stone keep built by Gerald de Windsor around the year 1100. Gerald was made castellan of Pembroke Castle by Arnulf of Montgomery in the first Norman invasion of Pembrokeshire. He married Nest, princess of Deheubarth around 1095. Nest brought the manor of Carew as part of her dowry, and Gerald cleared the existing fort to build his own castle on Norman lines. The original outer walls were timber, and only the keep was of stone. This still exists in the later structure as the "Old Tower".

=== Medieval ===
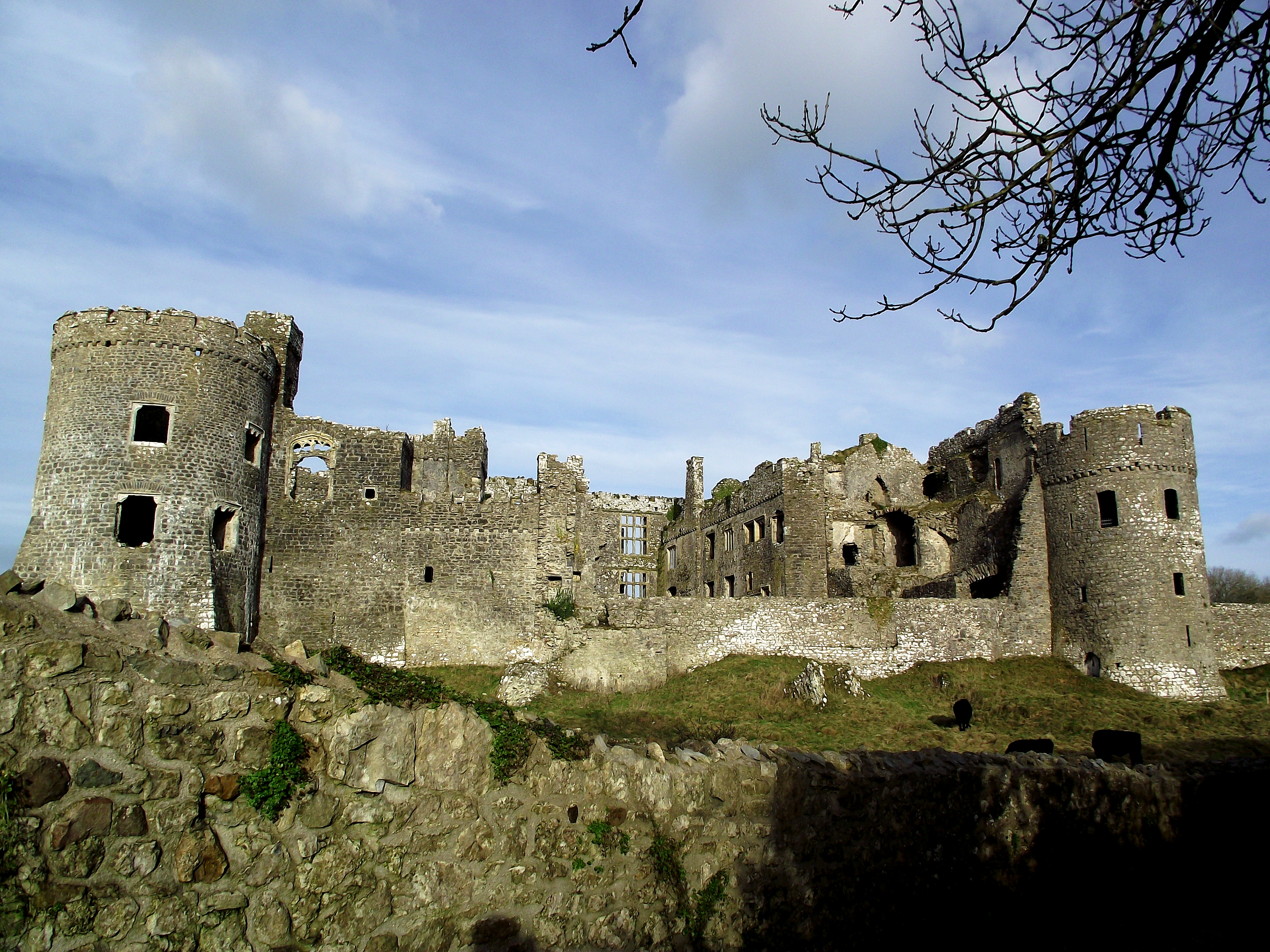
Carew Castle, overlooking the wall

Gerald's son William took the name "de Carew", and in the middle of the 12th century created an enclosure with stone walls incorporating the original keep, and a "Great Hall" inside it. The current high-walled structure with a complex of rooms and halls around the circumference was created in about 1270 by Nicholas de Carew (d.1297), concurrent with (and influenced by) the construction of the Edwardian castles in North Wales. At this time, the outer ward was also walled in.

=== Tudor period ===
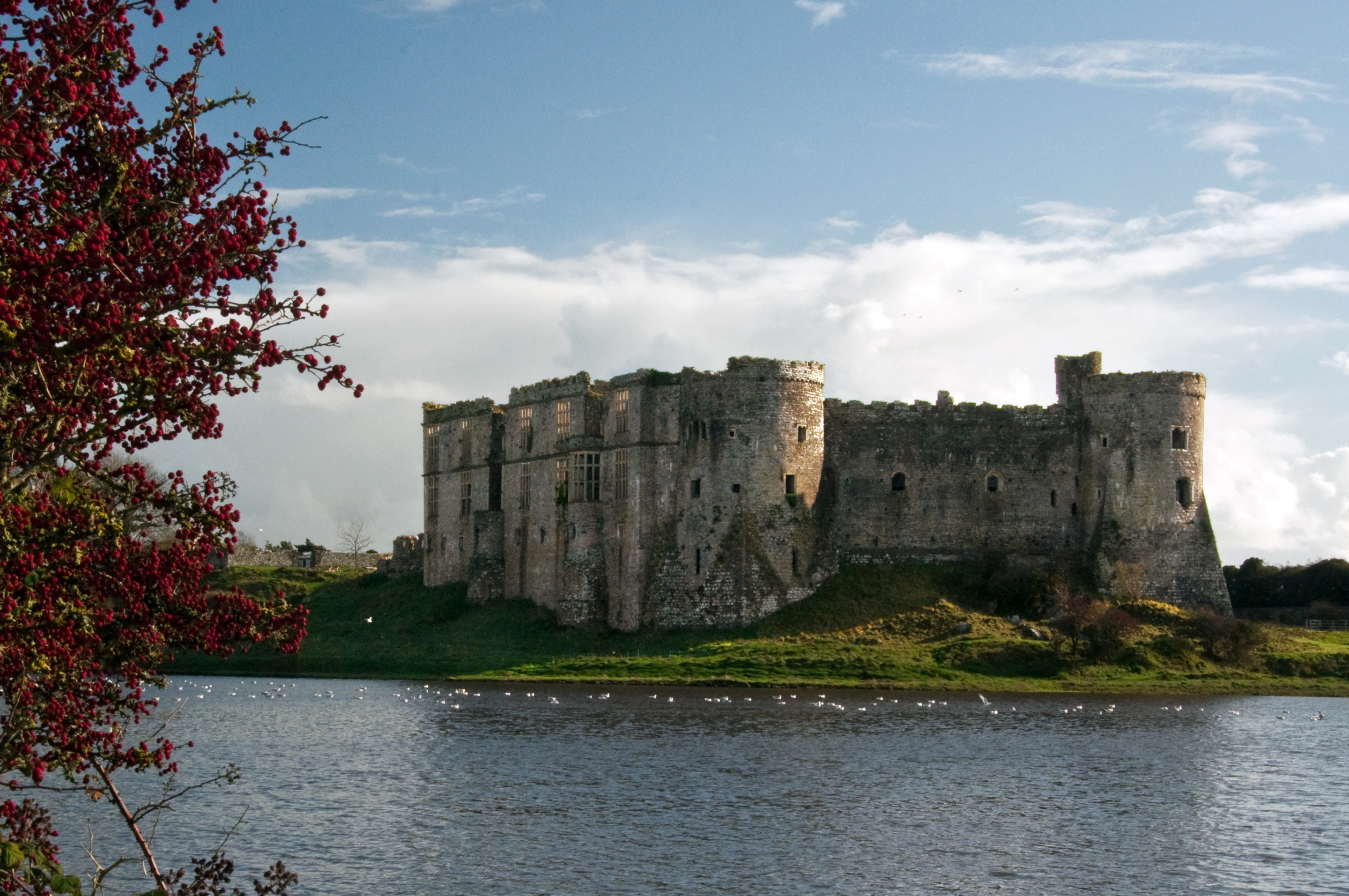
Carew Castle from the river

The de Carews fell on hard times in the post-Black Death period and mortgaged the castle. It fell into the hands of Rhys ap Thomas, who made his fortune by strategically changing sides and backing Henry VII just before the battle of Bosworth.

Rewarded with lands and a knighthood, he extended the castle with luxurious apartments with many Tudor features in the late 15th century. An inner doorway is decorated with three coats of arms: those of Henry VII, his son Arthur and Arthur's wife Catherine of Aragon. He also remodelled the great hall and built the lesser hall; in doing so he added a large window to the great hall facing the inner gatehouse and lesser hall. The historian Audrey Thorstad suggests that this was to draw attention to the castle's architecture, and contrasted this with the decision not to install such a window with views outside the castle towards the Carew River.

The royal allegiance turned sour. Rhys' grandson Rhys ap Gruffudd fell out of favour and was executed by Henry VIII for treason in 1531. The castle thus reverted to the crown and was leased to various tenants. In 1558 it was acquired by Sir John Perrot, a Lord Deputy of Ireland, who completed the final substantial modifications of the castle. The Elizabethan plutocrat reconstructed the north walls to build a long range of domestic rooms.

=== Demise ===
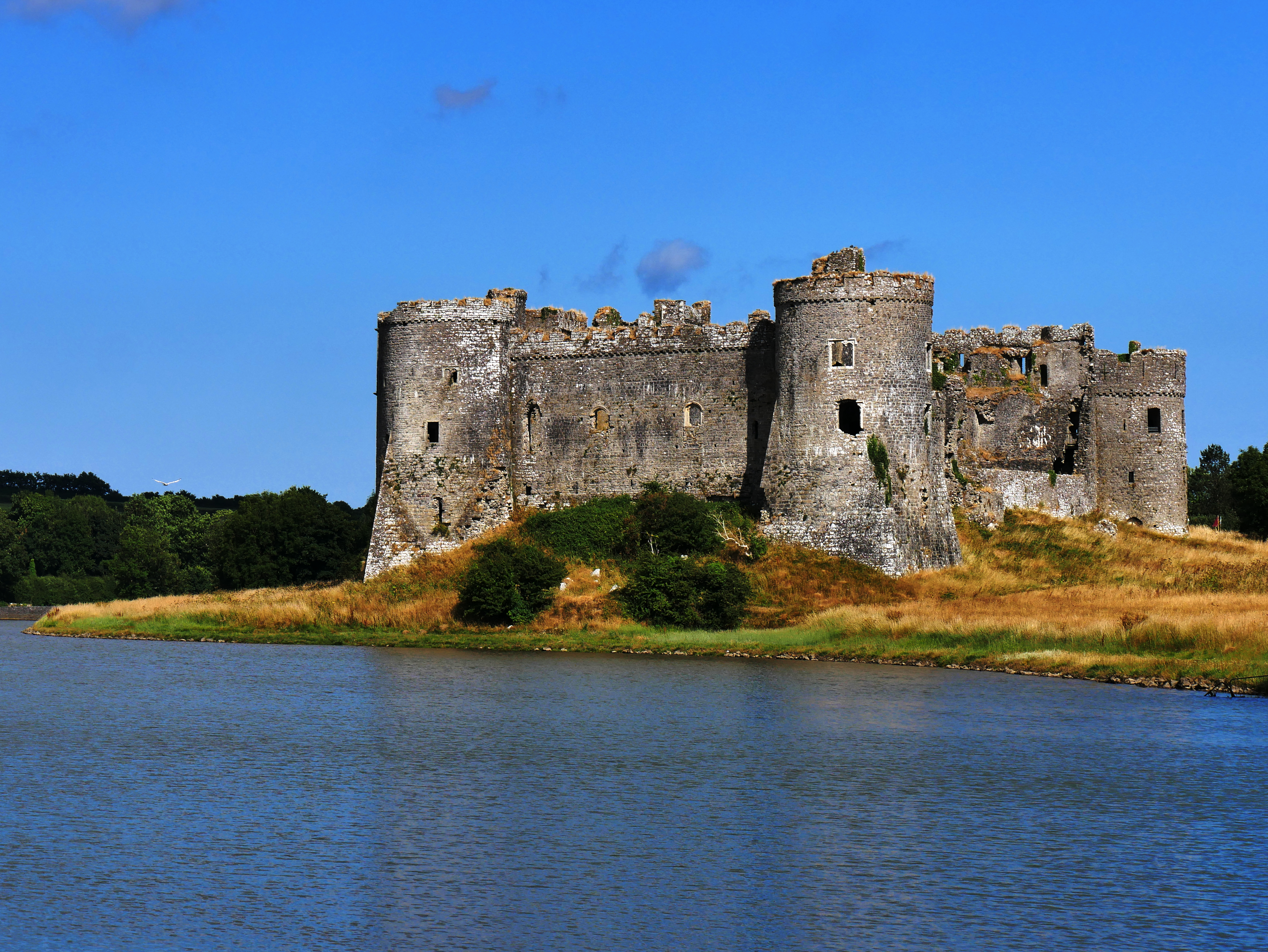
Viewed from the west

Perrot subsequently fell out of favour and died imprisoned in the Tower of London in 1592. The castle reverted to the crown and was finally re-purchased by the de Carew family in 1607. In the Civil War, the castle was refortified by Royalists although south Pembrokeshire was strongly Parliamentarian. After changing hands three times, the south wall was pulled down to render the castle indefensible to Royalists. At the Restoration the castle was returned to the de Carews, who continued to occupy the eastern wing until 1686.

The castle was then abandoned and allowed to decay. Much of the structure was looted for building stone and for lime burning. Since 1984 Cadw has funded a substantial amount of restoration performed by the Pembrokeshire National Park Authority.

== Tidal mill ==
Carew Tidal Mill is the only restored tidal mill in Wales. The origins of the mill are undocumented but evidence suggests that a mill was in existence on the site by 1542. It is often called the "French Mill" and this may have arisen from its use of French burrstone millstones. Causeway walls and floodgates were restored by Sir John Carew in about 1615. One of the mill wheels is dated 1801. Use of the mill ended in 1937 and the building became derelict.

== Gallery ==
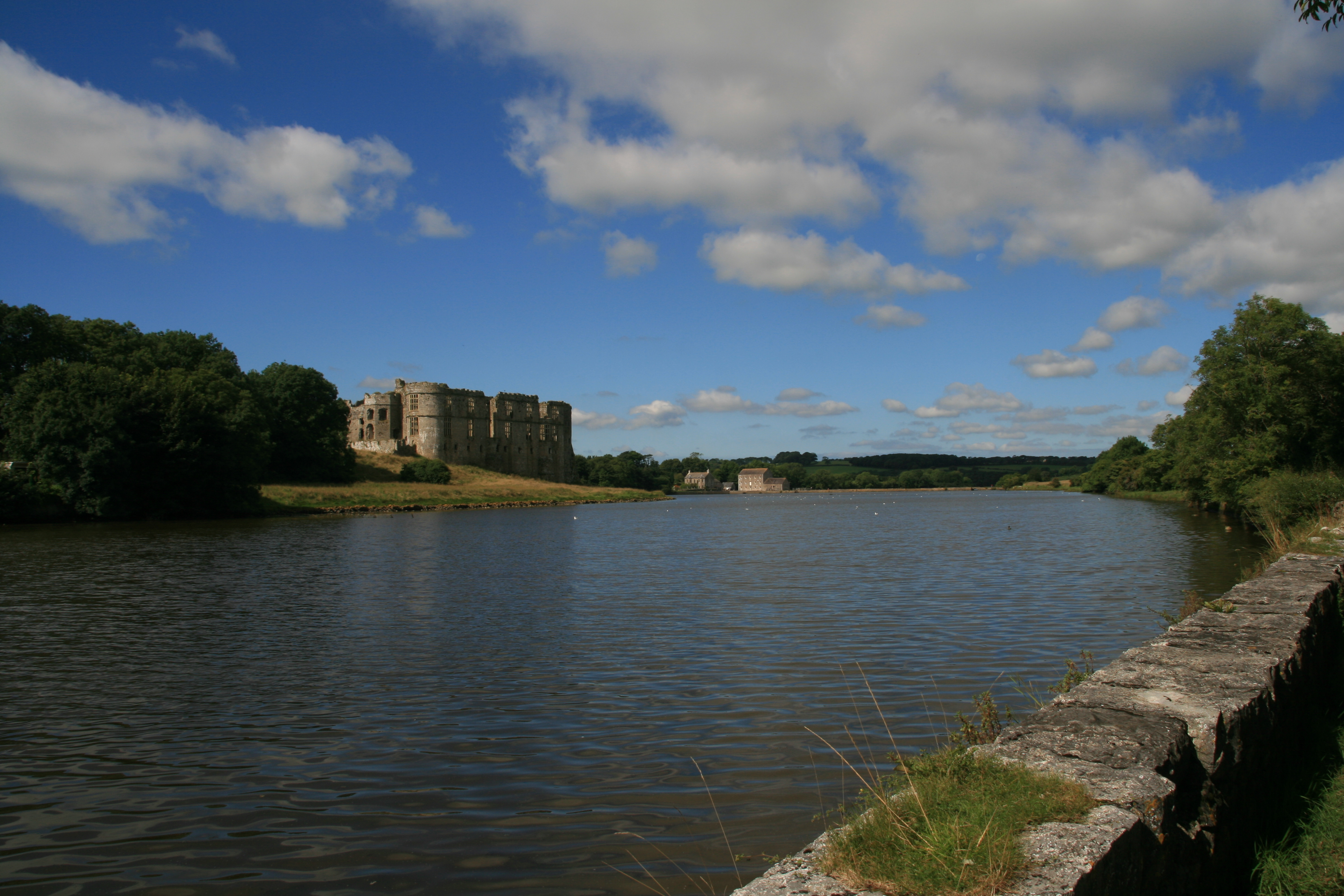

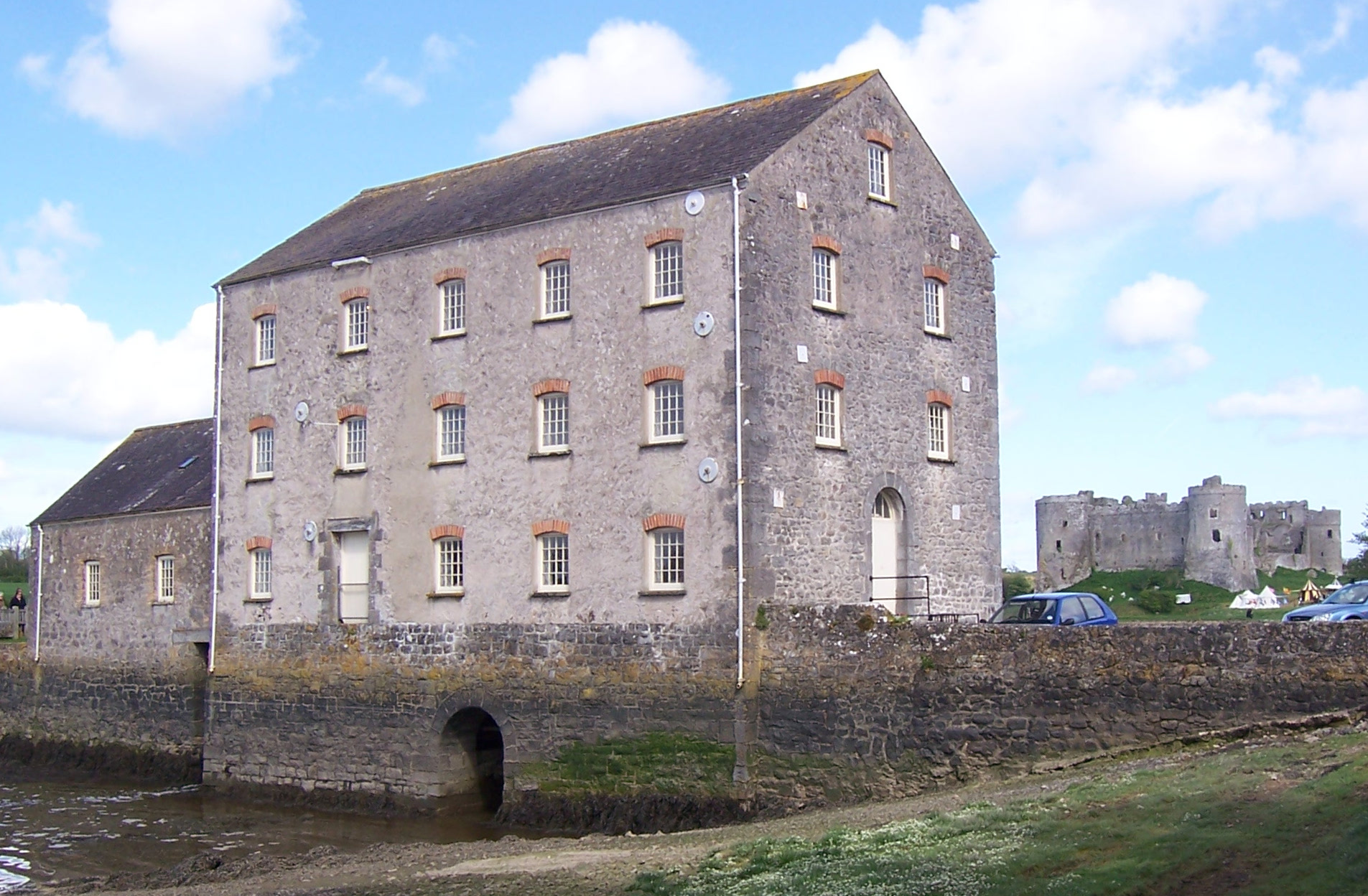

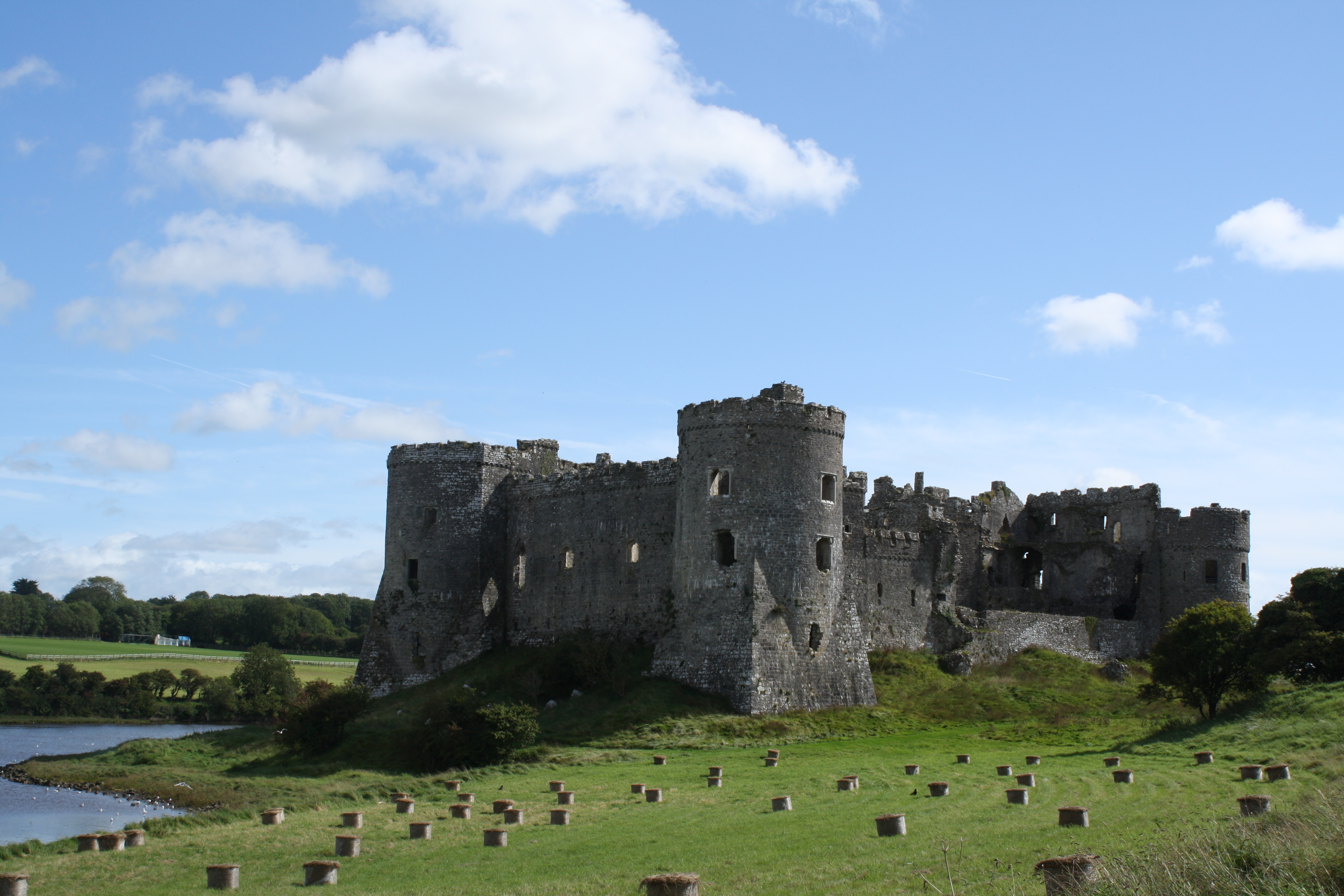

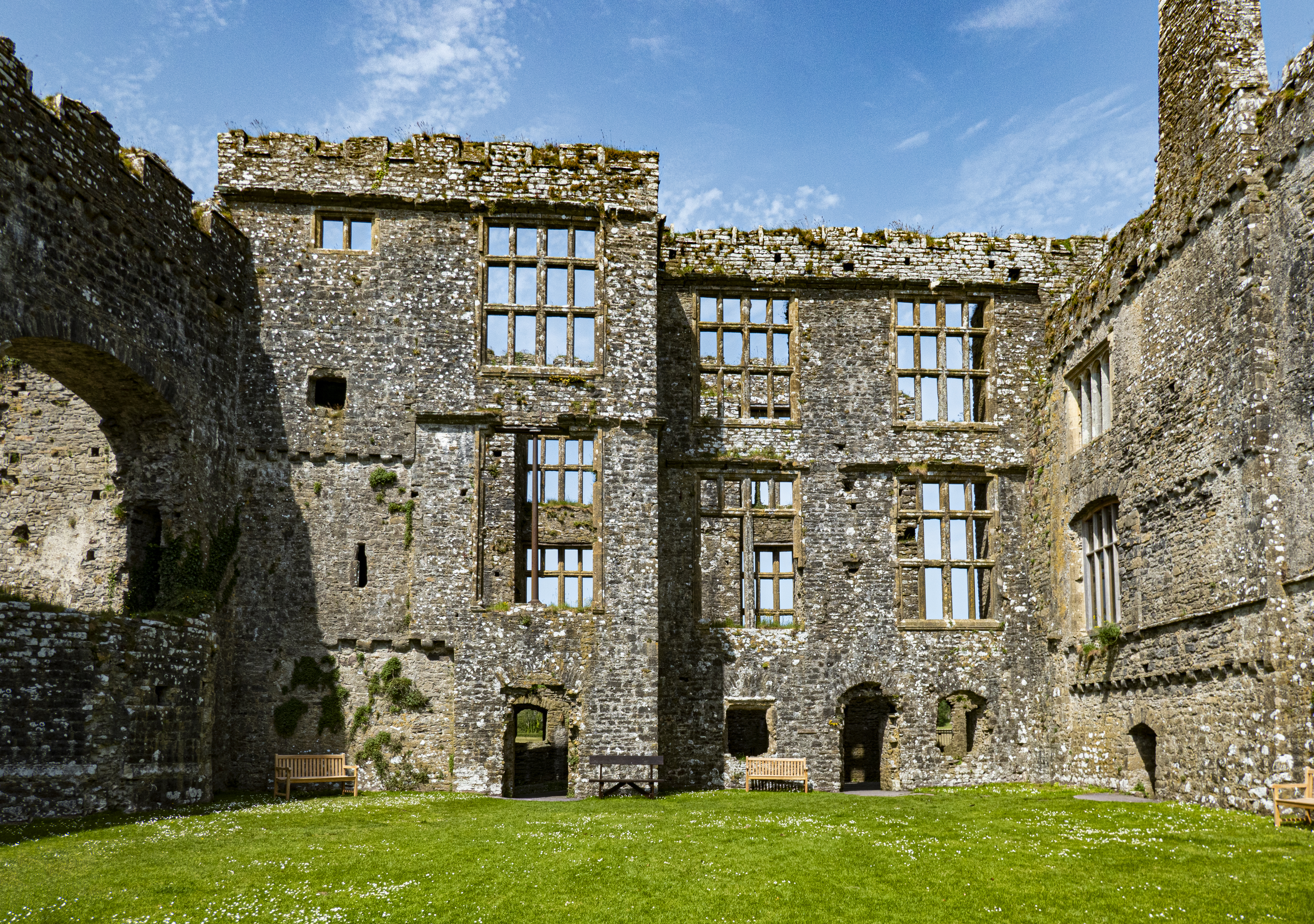
