= James M. Carew =

American politician

Member of the New Hampshire House of Representatives from the Hillsborough 1st district
- In office 2004–2006

Personal details
- Born: September 12, 1932
- Died: March 21, 2018 (aged 85)
- Party: Republican
- Children: 4

James M. Carew (September 12, 1932 – March 21, 2018) was an American politician. He served as a Republican member for the Hillsborough 1st district of the New Hampshire House of Representatives.

Carew died on March 21, 2018, at the age of 85.
