= Victor Keyru =

Russian basketball player

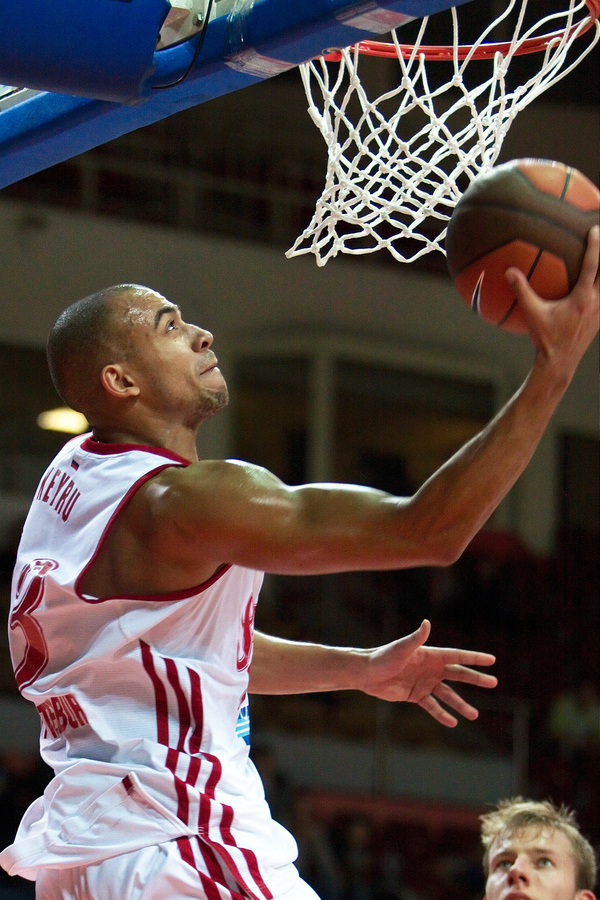
- Keyru with Spartak in 2011

Personal information
- Born: January 31, 1984 (age 42) Rostov-on-Don, Russian SFSR, Soviet Union
- Listed height: 6 ft 6.75 in (2.00 m)
- Listed weight: 225 lb (102 kg)

Career information
- NBA draft: 2006: undrafted
- Playing career: 2003–2014
- Position: Shooting guard / small forward

Career history
- 2003–2005: UNICS Kazan
- 2005–2006: BC Dynamo Saint Petersburg
- 2006–2007: Spartak Primorje
- 2007–2008: UNICS Kazan
- 2008–2010: CSKA Moscow
- 2010–2011: Dynamo Moscow
- 2011–2012: Spartak St. Petersburg
- 2013–2014: Krasnye Krylia

Career highlights
- 2× Russian League champion (2009, 2010); 2× VTB United League champion (2008, 2010); Russian Cup winner (2010); FIBA Europe League winner (2004)

Victor Johnovich Keyru (alternate spelling: Viktor Keirou) (Russian: Виктор Джонович Кейру; born January 31, 1984) is a Russian former professional basketball player. Standing at 2.00 m (6 ft 6 1/2 in), he played both the small forward and the shooting guard positions. He represented the Russian national basketball team.

== Professional career ==
Keyru joined CSKA Moscow in June 2008. In July 2010 he signed with Dynamo Moscow.

== National team career ==
Keyru has also been a member of the senior Russian national basketball team. He competed with Russia at the 2008 Olympics Basketball Tournament.

== Personal ==
- His father John Carew is from Sierra Leone (he represented his country in 100m competition at the 1980 Olympics) and his mother is Ukrainian.
- His sister Katerina Keyru played for Russia's women's Under-21 national basketball team.
- His brother Olah Keyru (Ола Кейру) is a famous TV-series actor on MTV Russia.
