= Tenby Lifeboat Station =

Lifeboat station in Pembrokeshire, Wales

- Gorsaf Bad Achub Dinbych-y Pysgod

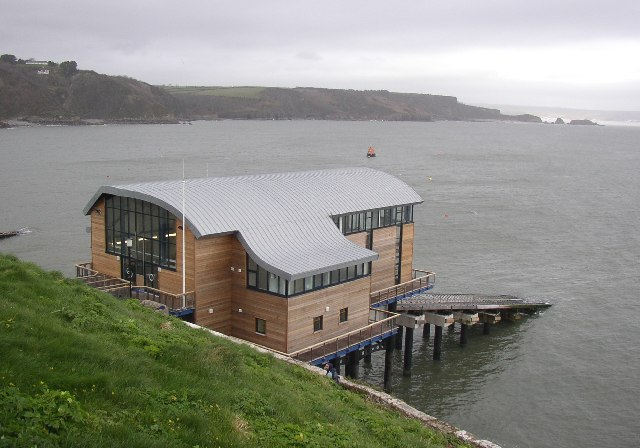
- Tenby's 2005 Lifeboat Station

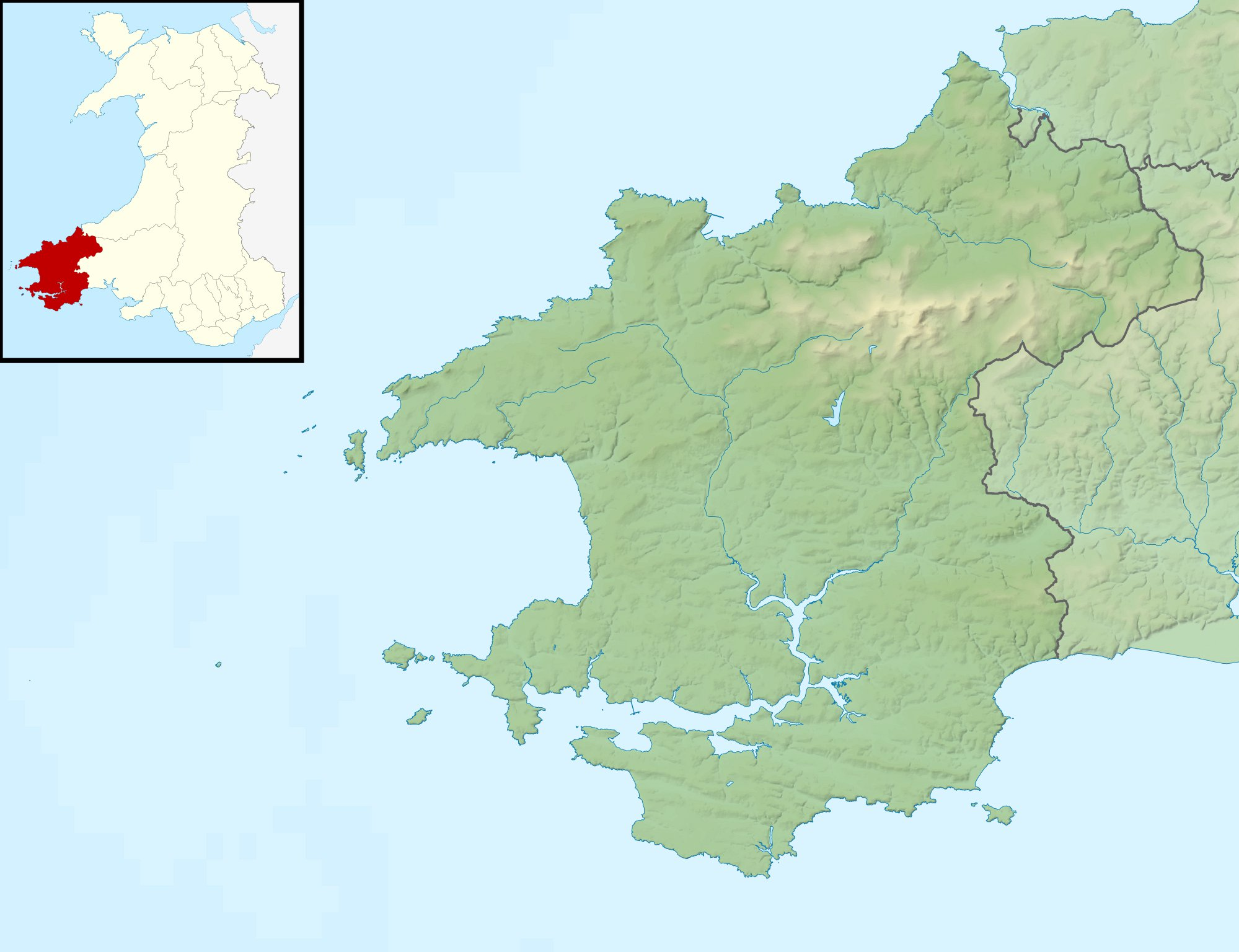
- Location within Pembrokeshire

General information
- Type: RNLI Lifeboat Station
- Location: Castle Square, Tenby, Pembrokeshire, SA70 7BS, Wales
- Coordinates: 51°40′23″N 4°41′38″W
- Opened: 1854
- Owner: Royal National Lifeboat Institution, on land leased from the Crown Estate

Website
- Tenby RNLI Lifeboat Station

Tenby Lifeboat Station (Welsh: Gorsaf Bad Achub Dinbych-y Pysgod) comprises two locations, an All-weather lifeboat station, and a separate Inshore lifeboat station, in Tenby, a seaside resort approximately 40 miles (64 km) due west of Swansea, on the western shore of Carmarthen Bay, in Pembrokeshire, Wales.

A lifeboat station was established at Tenby by The Shipwrecked Fishermen and Mariners' Royal Benevolent Society (SFMRBS) in 1852, passing to the management of the Royal National Lifeboat Institution (RNLI) in 1854.

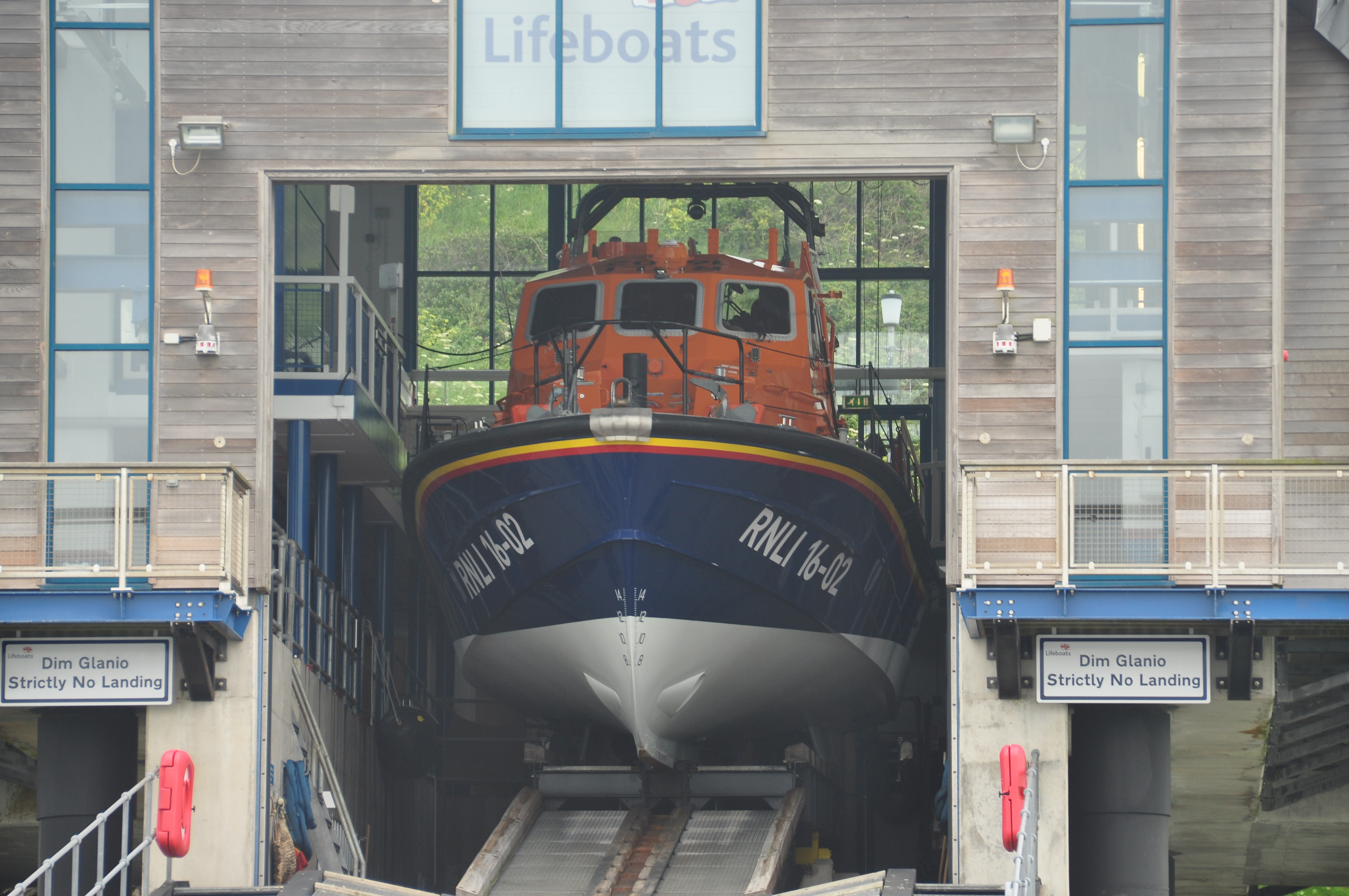
Tamar-class All-weather lifeboat 16-02 Haydn Miller (ON 1282) on station

The station currently operates 16-02 Haydn Miller (ON 1282), a Tamar-class All-weather lifeboat, on station since 2006, and Kathleen Ann (D-858), a smaller D-class (IB1) Inshore lifeboat, on station since 2022.

== History ==
Ever since its founding in 1824, the Royal National Institution for the Preservation of Life from Shipwreck (RNIPLS), later to become the RNLI in 1854, would award medals for deeds of gallantry at sea, even if no lifeboats were involved. On 22 October 1834, Boatman John Ray made more than a dozen attempts to rescue a man, who had fallen overboard from the sloop Mary. Although his efforts proved unsuccessful, Ray was awarded the RNIPLS Silver Medal for his gallantry.

Tenby Lifeboat Station was established in 1852, by The Shipwrecked Fishermen and Mariners' Royal Benevolent Society (SFMRBS). A 28-foot (8.5 m) lifeboat constructed by James Beeching of Great Yarmouth, named Grace Darling, was acquired at a cost of £125, and operated from the small boathouse tucked against the harbour wall.

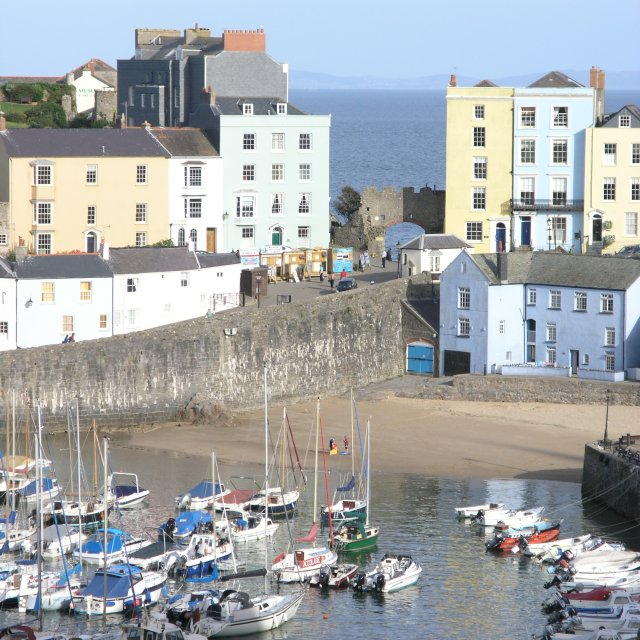
SFMRBS boathouse (with blue door), Tenby Harbour

By 1854, the SFMRBS was involved in the management of eight lifeboat stations, Lytham, Rhyl, Portmadoc, Hornsea, Llanelli, Teignmouth, Newhaven and Tenby. Discussions were held between the SFMRBS and the RNLI, and an agreement was made, where the former would concentrate on the welfare of those rescued, whilst the latter would be involved in lifeboats, stations and rescues. Management of all eight stations was transferred to the RNLI on 7 December 1854.

Grace Darling was sent to boat-builders Forrest of Limehouse, London for modification work, at a cost of £104-18s-9d, to bring her to RNLI specifications, returning to station, and operating until 1863.

Between 1854 and 1859, the RNLI Silver Medal for gallantry was awarded 4 times, including service to the following vessels:

- Schooner Agenoria of Bideford, saved three, 20 December 1855
- Schooner Alexandre of Le Havre, saved five, 20 December 1855
- Brig Policy of Sunderland, 7 November 1859

A new boathouse was constructed on Castle Beach in 1862, at a cost of £190, in preparation for the arrival of the new boat, which arrived on station in 1863. The 33-foot (10 m) Peake-class self-righting 'Pulling and Sailing' (P&S) lifeboat, one with sails and (10) oars, was built by Forrestt of Limehouse, London, and cost £260. Along with a transporting carriage, the boat was conveyed to Ferryside, free of charge, by the Great Western and South Wales railway companies. The 1862 boathouse would be demolished in 1894, replaced on the same site with a limestone built boathouse, faced in Ashlar, and designed by W. T. Douglas.

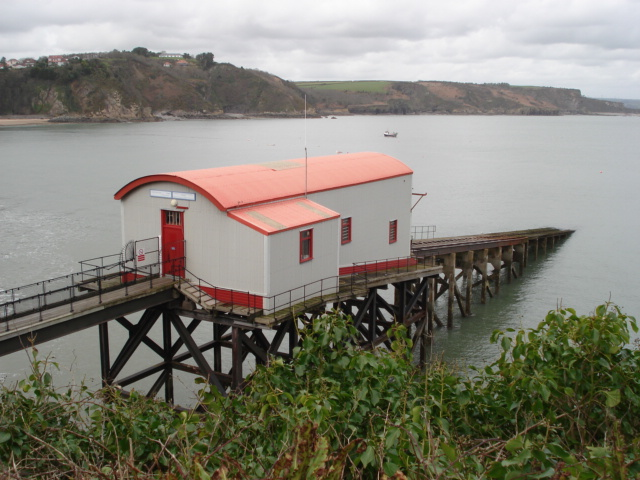
The 1905 lifeboat station in 2007.

A difficulty with launching from the harbour site was the shallow angle of the underlying geological strata. The sand beaches at Tenby were a hazard due to the speed of the tide, and an obstacle to overcome while dragging a 2-ton lifeboat from the harbour. When the boat was replaced in 1905 with a larger and heavier one, a new boathouse and roller slipway were built on the north side of Castle Hill. It was constructed using the new screw-piles that had been created for the foundations in deep sand of Victorian era pleasure piers. The lifeboat could then be launched in all weathers and states of tide. It later became a public access way, with the ferry boat to Caldey Island using the slipway as a disembarkation point for tourists. Due to the legal status of foreshore in the UK, the ground on which these lifeboat stations are built has been leased from the Crown Estate.

In 1923, the first motor-powered lifeboat came on station. The lifeboat operated throughout World War II, in part due to the three squadrons of Royal Air Force Short Sunderland flying boats operating from Milford Haven. In 1952 the station was awarded an RNLI Vellum for 100 years of service.

=== 1972-onwards: dual-boat station ===
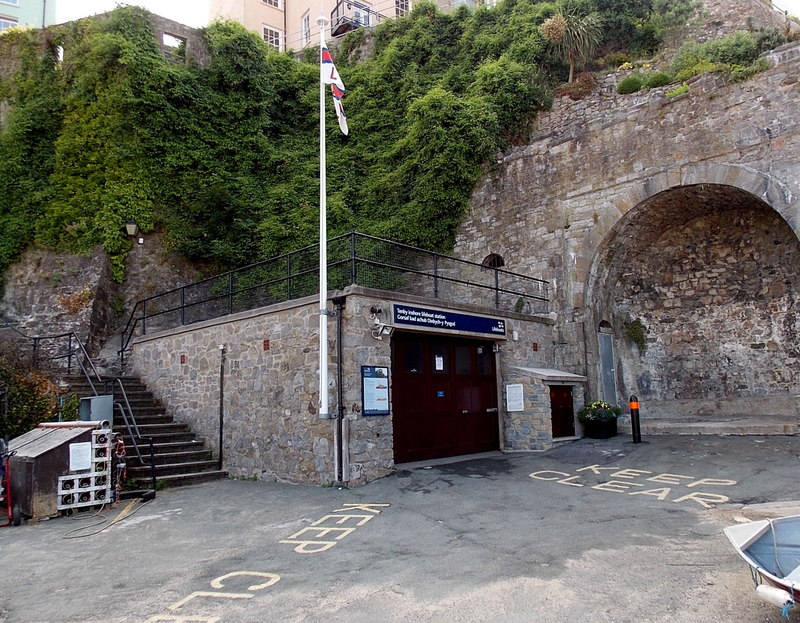
1976 Tenby Inshore Lifeboat Station

From 1972, the station became a dual-boat station with an D-class (RFD PB16) Inshore lifeboat (D-204) stationed within Tenby Harbour. In 1976, a new ILB boathouse was built on the north side of the harbour to house the boat and a tractor.ref name="Tenby RNLI"/>

On 6 September 1986, the Tyne-class lifeboat RFA Sir Galahad came on station. Named after the Royal Fleet Auxiliary Round Table-class landing ship logistics which was sunk subsequent to being damaged during the Falklands War, it became the last boat to use the original boathouse. By the time the station was awarded its 150 years Vellum by the RNLI in 2002, another new lifeboat house was planned.

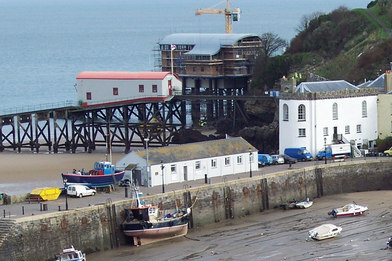
Tenby harbour in November 2004 at low-tide with the 1905 lifeboat station and the 2005 lifeboat station still under construction

Having obtained an extended lease from the Crown Estate, the RNLI obtained planning permission from the council to build a new lifeboat station on the site of the demolished Victorian era pleasure pier. Due to access restrictions via the North Castle cliff, the £5.5million lifeboat station was built from the sea. Only a supply of concrete was approved to be transported by road through the town. Construction, commissioning works and acceptance were completed in March 2005.

Tenby received the first of the new Tamar-class lifeboats, the Haydn Miller, which came on station for training in March 2006. The lifeboat was named after a farmer, who left £3million to the RNLI in his will. While the crew were still under training, the boat had a successful callout in April 2006.

After being refused planning permission to demolish the old Grade II listed lifeboat station, which had been extended twice to accommodate larger lifeboats, the RNLI eventually sold it into private hands. The new owner agreed the purchase of the freehold from the Crown Estate, and converted it into a four bedroom property. Development of the property was covered by Channel 4 for an episode of Grand Designs, and finished in 2011.

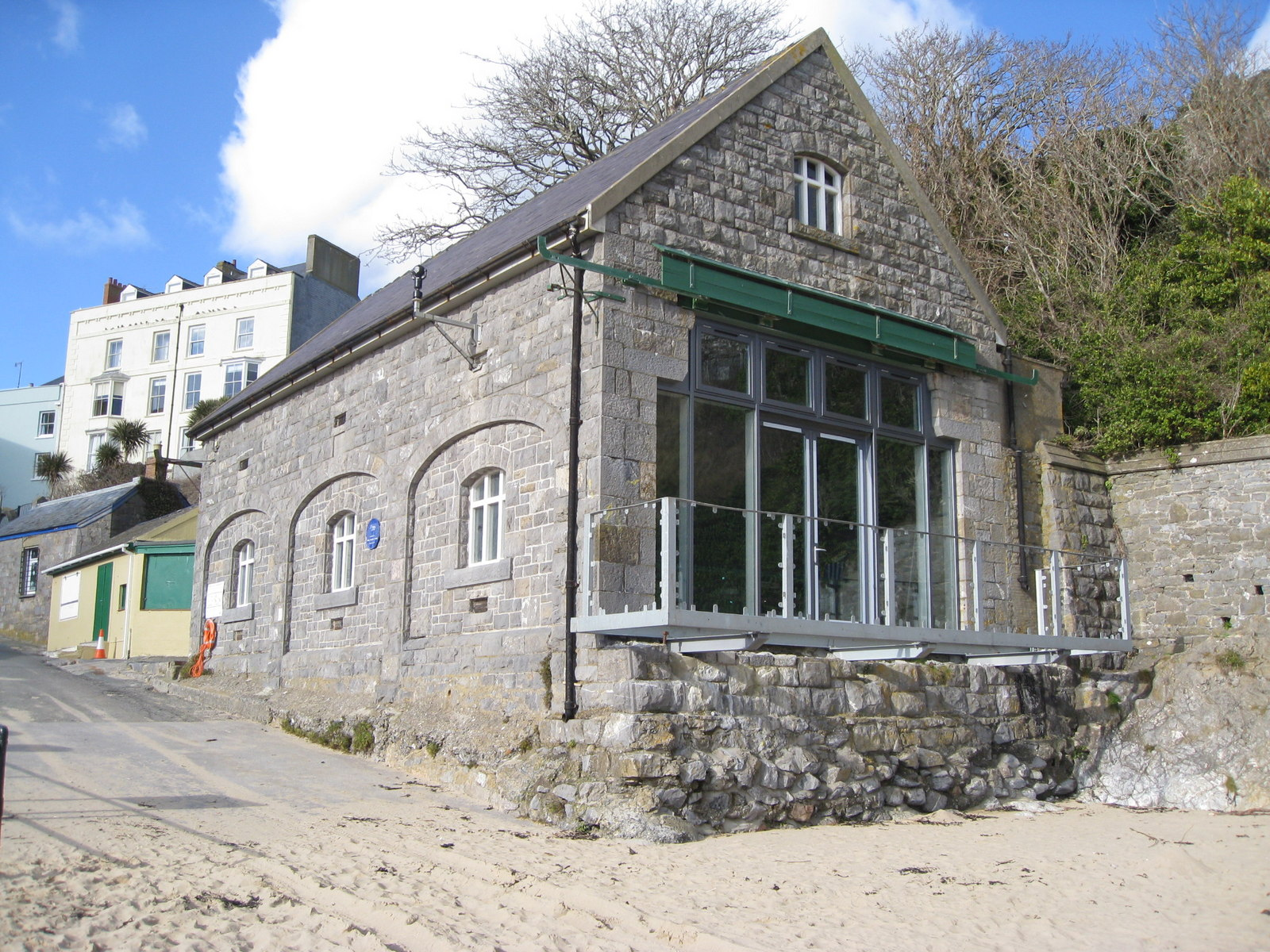
The 1894 Victorian lifeboat station on Castle Beach

In 2022, the RNLI received planning permission, to convert the 1894 Grade II listed former RNLI boat House on Castle Beach, into the new home for the Inshore Lifeboat, with up-to-date crew facilities. Work began in late January 2022, to refurbish the old station, and to restore the slipway ramp.

On 8 October 2022, the restored station building was officially reopened, partly funded by the legacy of Dr and Mrs Geoffrey Wood-Smith, in memory of their daughter Patricia Wood-Smith, and a donation from John Hill, in memory of his wife, Marjorie. The event also saw the delayed naming ceremony of the new D-class (IB1) Inshore lifeboat, which had been on station since October 2021, and had already saved the lives of two fishermen. Funded partially from the gift of Ann Myfanwy John, and the legacy of Kathleen Ann Pearson, the lifeboat was named Kathleen Ann (D-858).

== Visitor access ==
This station is classed as an "Explore" lifeboat station by the RNLI, aiming to offer their best visitor experience. When the boats are not on call, the station offers free access in the summer months, and pre-booked tours in the winter. Visitors can go inside and look around, see the lifeboat and visit the RNLI gift shop.

== Awards ==
The following are awards made at Tenby:

- RNIPLS Silver Medal
  John Ray, Boatman – 14 January 1835
- RNLI Silver Medal
  Lt. Richard Jesse, RN, H.M. Coastguard, Tenby – 2 January 1856
  Robert Parrott, Chief Boatman, H.M. Coastguard, Tenby – 6 March 1856
  The Hon Lt. Robert Francis Boyle, RN, H.M. Coastguard, Tenby – 1 December 1859
  Robert Parrott, Chief Boatman, H.M. Coastguard, Tenby, Coxswain – 1 December 1859 (Second-service clasp)
  Thomas Monger, H.M. Coastguard, Tenby, Coxswain – 4 November 1875
  John Rees, Second Coxswain – 10 February 1938
  Thomas Benjamin Richards, Coxswain – 12 November 1953
  Michael Ormond Wilson, Second Officer, crew member – 10 November 1966
  William Alan Thomas, Coxswain – 16 January 1990
- RNLI Bronze Medal
  Alfred Cottam, Motor Mechanic – 10 February 1938
  William Raymond Thomas, Bowman – 12 November 1953
  William Henry George Rogers, Motor Mechanic – 12 November 1953
  Joshua William Richards, Bowman – 10 November 1966
  Joshua William Richards, Coxswain – 24 March 1982 (Second-service clasp)
- The Maud Smith Award
  (for the bravest act of lifesaving during the year by a member of a lifeboat crew)
  Michael Ormond Wilson, crew member – 1966
  William Alan Thomas, Coxswain – 1990
- 'The Thanks of the Institution inscribed on Vellum'
  John John, crew member – 1982
  Michael Wilson, crew member – 1982
  William Alan Thomas, Coxswain – 1983
  Charles Hugh Crockford, crew member – 1983
  Nicholas Tebbutt, crew member – 1984
  Nicholas Crockford, crew member – 1984
  Dennis Young, Helm – 1986
  John John, crew member – 1986
  William James, crew member – 1986
  Roy Young, crew member – 1986
- 'A Framed Letter of Thanks signed by the Chairman of the Institution'
  Coxswain and crew – 1963
  Ivor Crockford, Acting Coxswain – 1968
  Coxswain and crew – 1969, (with special reference to Second Coxswain Joshua Richards and crew members John John and Michael Crockford).
- 'Letter of Thanks signed by the Secretary of the Institution'
  R. Thomas, Assistant Mechanic – 1968
- Framed Certificate of Merit, awarded by the RSPCA
  Coxswain and crew – 1959
- Member, Order of the British Empire (MBE)
  Charles Hugh Crockford – 2002NYH
  William Alan Thomas – 2004NYH
  Doreen Lilian Mortimer, Volunteer Shop Manager – 2024NYH

== Roll of honour ==
In memory of those lost whilst serving Tenby lifeboat:

- Collapsed while pulling up the Radar mast, during the launch of the lifeboat on 17 July 1988, and died the following day.
  John Walter John, Second Coxswain (71)

== Tenby lifeboats ==
=== Pulling and Sailing (P&S) lifeboats ===
ON (Note: ON is the RNLI's Official Number of the boat.)	Name	Built	On station	Class	Comments
Pre-240	Grace Darling	1851	1852–1863	28-foot Beeching self-righting (P&S)	(Note: 28 ft 0 in (8.53 m) x 7 ft 0 in (2.13 m) (10-oared) Beeching self-righting (P&S) lifeboat, funded by the SFMRBS, built by James Beeching of Great Yarmouth, costing £125.); Condemned and returned to London in 1863.
Pre-402	Florence	1863	1863–1876	33-foot Peake self-righting (P&S)	(Note: 33 ft 0 in (10.06 m) x 8 ft 0 in (2.44 m) (10-oared) Peake-class self-righting (P&S) lifeboat, legacy of Mr F. R. Magenis of Grosvenor Place, built by Forrestt of Limehouse, London, costing £260.); Renamed Carolina Morriss' Divine Rescue in 1876.
Pre-402	Carolina Morriss' Divine Rescue	1863	1876–1885	33-foot Peake self-righting (P&S)	(Note: Legacy of Miss C. H. Morriss of Hammersmith); Broken up in January 1886.
57	Annie Collin	1885	1885–1902	34-foot self-righting (P&S)	(Note: 34 ft 0 in (10.36 m) x 8 ft 0 in (2.44 m) (10-oared) self-righting (P&S) lifeboat, legacy of Miss A. Collin of London, built by Forrestt of Limehouse, London, costing £368.); Transferred to Bull Bay.
497	William and Mary Devey	1902	1902–1923	38-foot Watson (P&S)	(Note: 38 ft 0 in (11.58 m) x 9 ft 4 in (2.84 m) (12-oared) self-righting (P&S) lifeboat, legacy of Miss E. Devey of Tunbridge Wells, built by Thames Ironworks of Blackwall, London, costing £984.); Sold in 1923.

Pre ON numbers are unofficial numbers used by the Lifeboat Enthusiasts' Society to reference early lifeboats not included on the official RNLI list.

=== Motor lifeboats ===
ON	Op.No. (Note: Op.No. is the RNLI's Operational Number of the boat carried on the hull.)	Name	Built	On station	Class	Comments
684	–	John R Webb	1923	1923–1930	45-foot Watson	Transferred to Barra Island.
729	–	John R Webb	1930	1930–1955	45-foot 6in Watson	Transferred to the Relief fleet.
925	–	Henry Comber Brown	1955	1955–1986	46-foot 9in Watson	
1112	47-010	RFA Sir Galahad	1986	1986–2006	Tyne	Transferred to the Relief fleet. Later at Angle.
1281	16-02	Haydn Miller	2005	2006–	Tamar	

More post-service details can be found on the respective lifeboat class pages.

=== Inshore lifeboats ===
==== D class ====
Op.No.	Name	On station	Class	Comments
D-204	Unnamed	1972–1986	D-class (RFD PB16)	
D-315	Charlie B	1986–1993	D-class (EA16)	
D-438	The Stanley Taylor	1993–2001	D-class (EA16)	
D-562	Georgina Stanley Taylor	2001–2009	D-class (EA16)	
D-727	Georgina Taylor	2009–2021	D-class (IB1)	The 3rd ILB donated by the legacy. Now of display in the RNLI Heritage Collection at Chatham Historic Dockyard.
D-858	Kathleen Ann	2021–	D-class (IB1)	

== See also ==
- List of RNLI stations
- List of former RNLI stations
- Royal National Lifeboat Institution lifeboats
