= Tenby Town Hall =

County Building in Tenby, Wales

- Neuadd y Dref Dinbych-y-pysgod (Welsh)
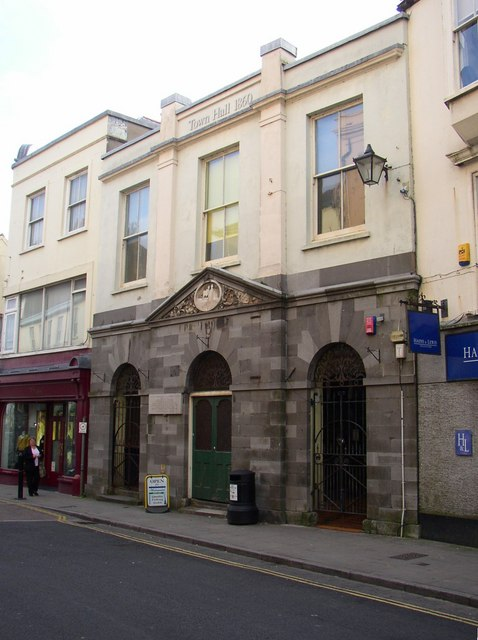
- Tenby Town Hall

- Shown in Pembrokeshire
- 51.6723°N 4.7007°W
- Location: High Street, Tenby

History
- Built: 1829

Site notes
- Architectural style: Neoclassical style

Listed Building – Grade II
- Official name: The Old Town Hall and Market Hall
- Designated: 19 March 1951; 75 years ago
- Reference no.: 6169

Tenby Town Hall (Welsh: Neuadd y Dref Dinbych-y-pysgod) is a municipal building in the High Street, Tenby, Pembrokeshire, Wales. The structure, which is used as an events venue, is a Grade II listed building.

== History ==
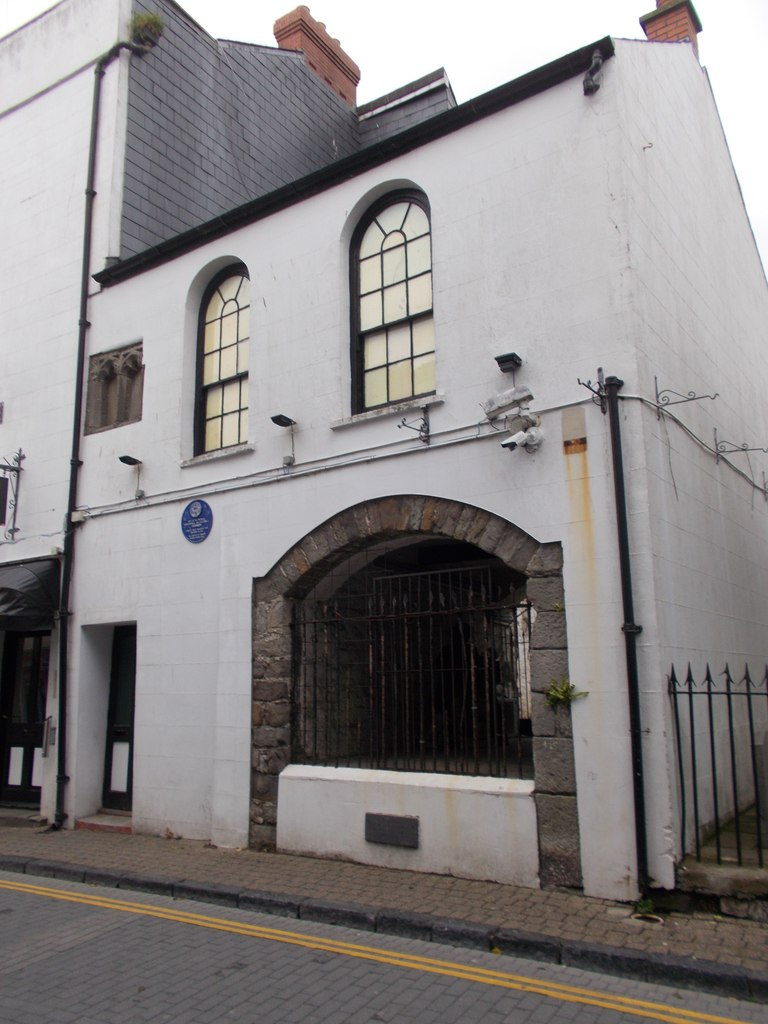
The medieval guildhall

The first municipal building in the town was a medieval guildhall in St George's Street which dated back at least to the late 15th century. It took the form of a single room, fenestrated by two round headed windows, which was built over a gateway to St Mary's Church. Following the incorporation of the borough in 1581, the borough council met in this room, which contained an iron chest used for the storage of the borough archives.

The current building in the High Street was commissioned as a single-storey market hall in the early 19th century. It was designed in the neoclassical style, built in limestone blocks and was completed in 1829. The design involved a symmetrical main frontage with three bays facing onto the High Street; each bay contained a round headed opening with a cast iron fanlight. The central bay, which slightly projected forward, was surmounted by a modillioned pediment with an oval plaque, carved to depict the borough seal, in the tympanum. Internally, the principal room was the market hall which stretched back to Upper Frog Street.

In the mid-19th century, the borough council decided to augment the structure with an extra floor. The enlargement was designed by John Cooper of Slebech, built by a local builder, William Davies, in brick with a stucco finish and was officially opened on 31 July 1860. The extra floor was fenestrated by sash windows, flanked by Doric order pilasters supporting a cornice and a parapet. Internally, the principal room was the new courtroom which, on completion of the works, became the new meeting place of the borough council.

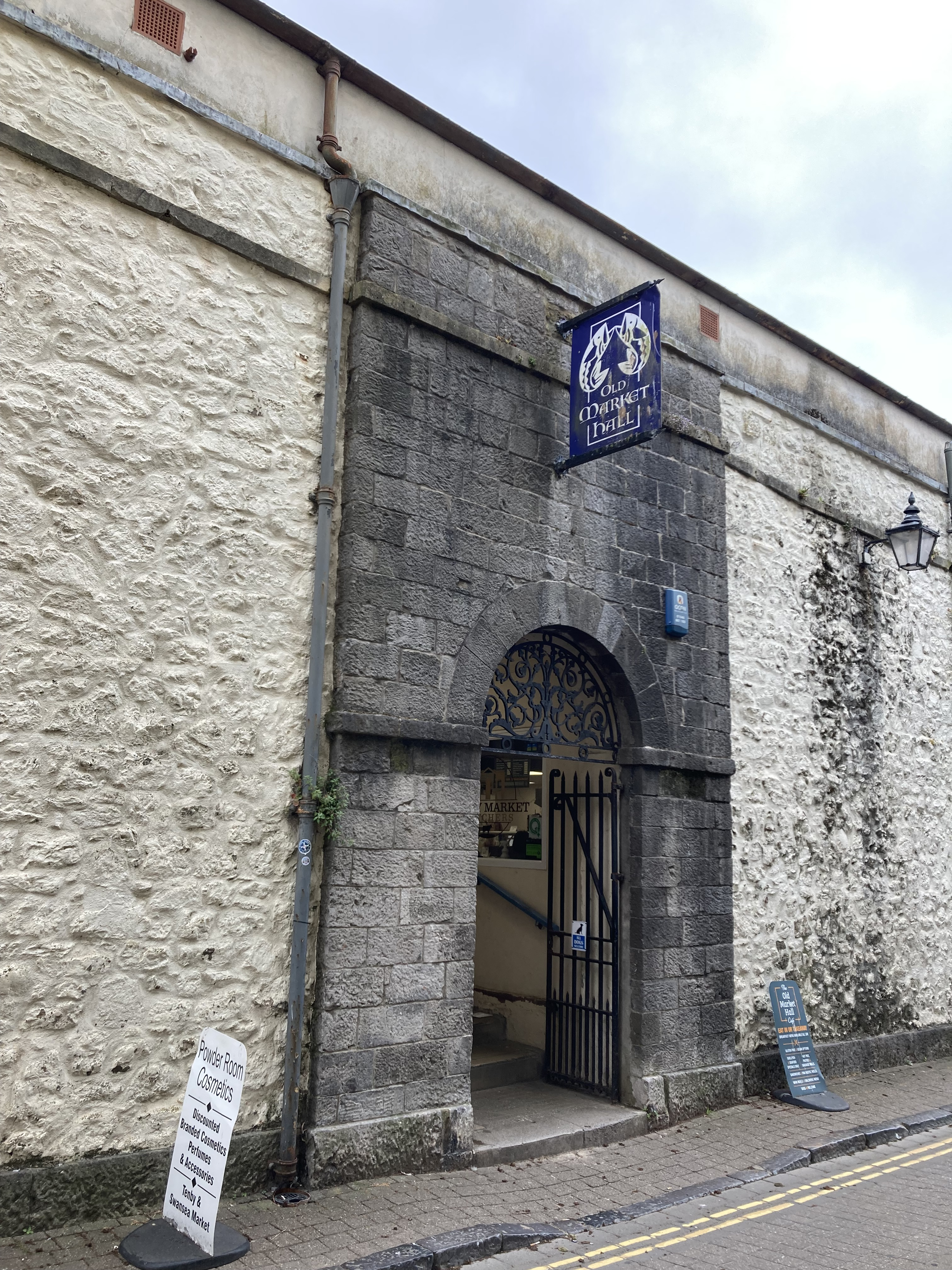
The rear of the Old Market Hall in Upper Frog Street

Some important political events took place in the town all in the late 19th century: in September 1881, the suffragettes, Helen Blackburn and Helena Downing, visited the town hall and made the case for women's rights, especially in the field of employment. Additional improvements, including a glass roof for the market hall and cast iron fanlights for the openings on Upper Frog Street, were completed in 1891. Then, in 1892, the local member of parliament, Charles Allen, was cheered in the town hall when he announced that he had secured an undertaking from the Prime Minister, William Ewart Gladstone, that Pembroke Dockyard, a major employer in the area, would stay open, despite Gladstone's stated aversion to increasing naval expenditure. Inquests were also held in the town hall: in October 1909 an inquest was held into the death of a man, aged about 35, whose body had been washed up on the beach at South Sands: his identity was never established.

The town hall continued to serve as the meeting place of the borough council until 1947. The town clerk's office was also in the building, but most of the council's staff were scattered around various other offices in the town. In 1947 the council bought a large 1820s house called Croft House on The Norton, which had previously been the Bay Hotel. Croft House was converted to become the council's offices and meeting place, and also incorporated a magistrates court. The council renamed the building "Civic Centre" when they first took it over, before renaming it again to "Guildhall" around 1963. Following local government reorganisation in 1974, the guildhall was used by Tenby Town Council until the mid-1980s when it moved to the De Valence Pavilion on Upper Frog Street, whilst the magistrates court closed in 2003. The guildhall was subsequently converted into flats.

After the borough council moved to Croft House in 1947, the town hall in High Street continued to be used as an events venue: performers included the rock band, Fleetwood Mac, who played a gig there in July 1971 and the rock band, Super Furry Animals, who played there in April 1999.
