= Sherrinford =

Sherringford may refer to:

- Sherrinford Holmes, a fictional character who is a proposed elder brother of Sherlock Holmes
- Sherrinford, a fictional prison in the Sherlock episode "The Final Problem"
