= St Catherine's Fort =

19th-century fort in Tenby, Wales

- Part of Pembrokeshire
- Tenby, Wales
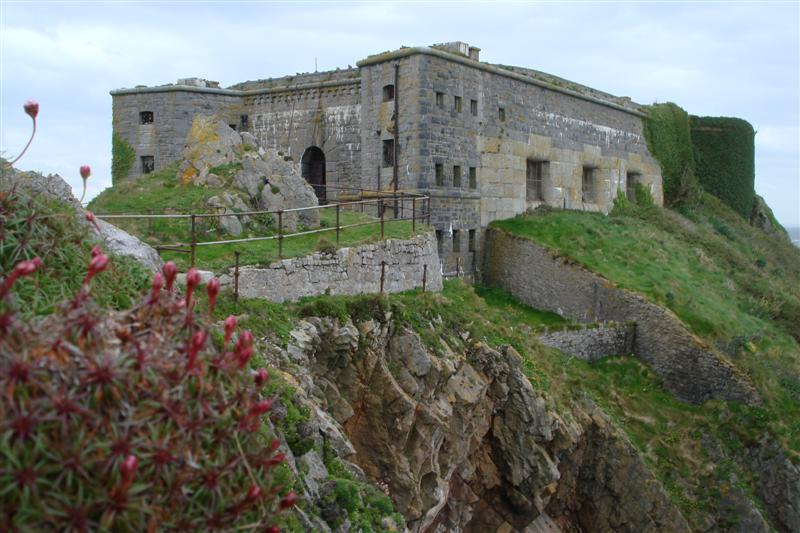
- The fort stands on St Catherine's Island next to Castle Rock, Tenby.

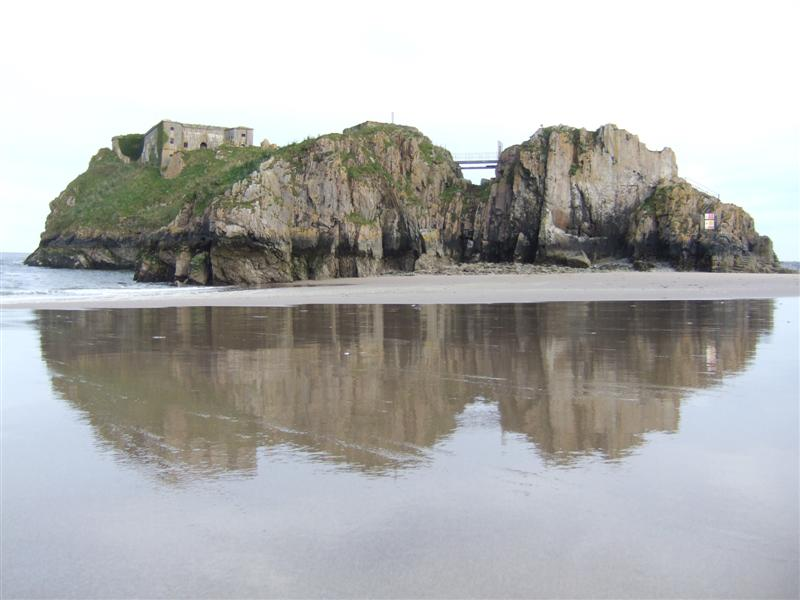
- St Catherine's Island and Fort

Site information
- Type: Palmerston Fort
- Owner: Private

Location
- Coordinates: 51.6706°N 4.6919°W
- Height: Up to 14 metres (46 ft)

Site history
- Built: 1870
- Materials: Limestone Granite

St Catherine's Fort is a 19th-century Palmerston Fort on St Catherine's Island, at Tenby, Pembrokeshire, Wales.

== History ==
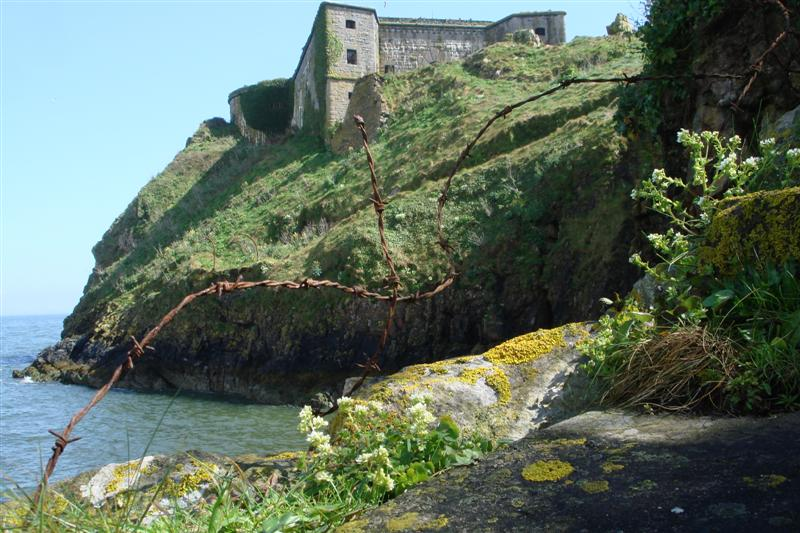
St Catherine's Fort from Lower Steps

=== Conception ===
The Royal Commission on the Defence of the United Kingdom, which Lord Palmerston had established in 1859 in response to a perceived threat of invasion by Emperor Napoleon III of France, recommended the fort's construction. When considering the defence of the Royal Dockyard at Pembroke Dock and the anchorage at Milford Haven, the Commissioners believed that there was a danger that an enemy force might conduct an amphibious landing on a beach on the southern Pembrokeshire coast followed by an overland attack on the naval facilities. The Commissioners envisioned a chain of coastal artillery forts extending along the coast from Tenby to Freshwater West covering all the potential landing sites; ultimately, only this fort at Tenby was constructed.

=== Design ===
The design of the fort is credited to Colonel William Jervois. It is a simple rectangular work, consisting of three artillery casemates on two opposite sides, for RML 7-inch guns firing through iron shields. A further three gun platforms for RML 9 inch 12 ton guns are located on the roof. The guns facing north were intended to cover Tenby Harbour and the beach towards Saundersfoot, while those facing south covered the beach towards Penally. The entrance at the western (landward) end of the fort is approached by means of a drawbridge over a dry ditch and is defended by two caponiers or "flanking galleries", each of three storeys pierced with loopholes for small arms fire. At the eastern end at basement level are located the powder magazine and shell store. There was accommodation for a garrison of 150 men.

=== Construction ===
The Government purchased St Catherine's Island from The Corporation of Tenby for £800 (Note: £800 in 1866 equates to approximately £82,000 in 2025, according to calculations based on the Consumer Price Index measure of inflation.) in 1866. In 1867 work began clearing the site and constructing the slopes and cranes for the mammoth task of lifting solid granite blocks onto the island. Construction was undertaken by a local builder, George Thomas of Pembroke. Colonel W. Llewelyn Morgan, Captain Fredrick Clements, and Sergeant Gibbs, all of the Royal Engineers, were the overseers. The work was completed by 1870 at a cost of £40,000 (Note: £40,000 in 1870 equates to approximately £4,117,000 in 2025, according to calculations based on the Consumer Price Index measure of inflation.) (but not armed); the gun shields were finally installed in 1886. In that year, a report to the Defence Committee described the 9-inch guns as "useless".

=== Later use ===
In 1895, control of the fort passed to the Royal Naval Reserve, who emplaced a single BLC 5-inch gun on a "Youngman’s compression platform", apparently for training purposes. In 1907 the fort was decommissioned and sold to Evan Jones for £500. (Note: £500 in 1907 equates to approximately £52,000 in 2025, according to calculations based on the Consumer Price Index measure of inflation.) In 1914, the fort was purchased by J. P. James for £2000 (Note: £2,000 in 1914 equates to approximately £200,000 in 2025, according to calculations based on the Consumer Price Index measure of inflation.) on behalf of Edward Windsor Richards, a wealthy steel merchant, who converted it into a private house for the use of his granddaughter, Lillian Windsor-Richards. The gun shields were replaced by windows and the interior was lavishly decorated, although the fort was apparently garrisoned by the army during the First World War. In 1940, Lillian Windsor-Richards was declared bankrupt. The contents of the fort were sold by Harrods, who then advertised the property for sale in Country Life at £10,000, (Note: £10,000 in 1940 equates to approximately £484,000 in 2025, according to calculations based on the Consumer Price Index measure of inflation.) before the fort was placed under a compulsory purchase order by the military. During the war an anti-aircraft battery was built in front of the fort; units serving there included the Royal Marines, 4th Defence Battery and a Light Anti-Aircraft Battery of the Royal Artillery, a detachment of the Belgian Army, the Home Guard, and an Air Sea Rescue detachment of the RAF.

After the war the fort was again decommissioned and sold to a local solicitor who let it to various tenants including the author Norman Lewis. It became a Grade II* Listed building in 1951 because it was considered "an important later 19th century naval fort, superbly built and prominently sited".

The fort was sold again in 1962 and in 1968 the fort was opened as a zoo; in 1979 the zoo relocated to new premises leaving the fort empty.

In May 2015, Pembrokeshire Coast National Park Authority approved an application to reopen the site to the public due to the economic benefit that it would bring to the area. The site would contain a nature walk, boat landings, and commercial and catering outlets, in addition to the restoration of the fort. During the planned restoration, the fort was open to visitors at weekends during the holiday season, subject to the state of the tides.

In 2016, "The Final Problem", the third and last episode of the fourth series of the BBC TV series Sherlock, was filmed on the island. In August 2016, the fort faced an "uncertain future" and was closed to the public.

== Present day ==
The fort was reopened on 12 April 2017 for visits with the support of volunteers and remains open to the public as of August 2026
