= Allen's of Tenby =

Photography studio in Wales

Allen's of Tenby was a firm of photographers established in "The Excelsior Studio", a photography studio at 1 Campbell House, High Street, Tenby, Pembrokeshire, opened by Harry Mortimer Allen (1864–1926) in 1890. In 1896, the studio was renamed "The Campbell Studio". Mortimer specialised in portraiture and landscapes. He was also a dealer in fine art and a picture framer. He also took "occasion" photographs and postcard images of Tenby and other local districts. In addition to black and white, he made colour-tinted postcards.
