= The Final Problem (Sherlock) =

- Sherlock episode
- Episode no.: Series 4 Episode 3
- Directed by: Benjamin Caron
- Written by: Steven Moffat; Mark Gatiss
- Cinematography by: David Luther
- Editing by: Yan Miles
- Original air date: 15 January 2017
- Running time: 89 minutes

Guest appearances
- Andrew Scott as Jim Moriarty; Sian Brooke as Eurus Holmes; Honor Kneafsey as Girl on Plane; Timothy Carlton as Mr. Holmes; Wanda Ventham as Mrs. Holmes; Art Malik as Prison Governor; Tom Stoughton as Young Sherlock; Indica Watson as Little Eurus; Simon Kunz as Sir Edwin; Richard Crehan as Ben; Matt Young as Young Police Officer; Tam Mutu as Leonard

Episode chronology
← Previous "The Lying Detective"	Next → —

"The Final Problem" is the third episode of the fourth series of the British television series Sherlock, and the thirteenth episode overall. The episode first aired on BBC One, PBS, Channel One and 1+1 on 15 January 2017. To date, no further episodes of Sherlock have been produced, making "The Final Problem" the presumptive series finale.

== Plot ==
A young girl wakes up on an aeroplane and finds everybody asleep. Panic stricken, she answers a ringing mobile phone, only to hear the voice of Jim Moriarty announce, "Welcome to the final problem".

After Sherlock stages a break-in at Mycroft's home and tricks Mycroft into revealing Eurus' existence, Mycroft reveals that, like himself and Sherlock, Eurus was also born with advanced intellectual abilities, even describing her as an era-defining genius on a par with Isaac Newton. However, she also has a total lack of normal sensation and emotion.

After she kidnapped and killed Sherlock's dog, Redbeard, and set their house on fire, Sherlock's parents sent Eurus to a mental institution. But Mycroft reveals that, behind their parents' backs, he had Eurus transferred to Sherrinford, a government "black site" and maximum-security "prison within a prison" in the North Sea. The whole experience had been so deeply traumatising to Sherlock that his memories of her had been “rewritten”.

Their conversation is interrupted when a quadcopter carrying a motion-activated grenade flies into Sherlock's flat. John, Sherlock, and Mycroft flee as the bomb detonates, blasting Holmes and Watson out of the windows. Later, John and Sherlock hijack a fishing trawler to travel to Sherrinford, carrying out a diversionary plan so that Sherlock can reach Eurus' cell with Mycroft disguising himself as a fisherman.

Mycroft and John corner the prison governor, discovering that he has explicitly disobeyed Mycroft's protocol and has allowed Eurus to interact with prison staff. Using her skill to "reprogram" everyone she speaks with, Eurus has effectively ruled the prison. Meanwhile, Sherlock talks to Eurus; but after toying with him, particularly about Redbeard's death, she attacks him and knocks him unconscious. The guards lock Sherlock, John, Mycroft, and the governor together in Eurus' old cell. It is then revealed that five years prior, Mycroft granted Eurus an unsupervised five-minute interview with Moriarty as a Christmas present, in exchange for her detecting national security threats to Britain. During that time, Moriarty agreed to record video messages for her.

John wakes up in Eurus’ cell with Sherlock, Mycroft, and the governor, and the young girl's distress call comes through the speakers. Sherlock tries to talk to the girl, but Eurus stops the call. After forcing the governor to kill himself, Eurus mentally torments Sherlock, Mycroft, and Watson, forcing them into cruel and deadly games to save their lives while videos of Moriarty taunt them. Although Eurus forces Sherlock to continue with the prospect of saving the girl on the aeroplane, he eventually stops the games by threatening to shoot himself when she orders him to murder either John or Mycroft. Furious, Eurus has the three of them shot with tranquilliser darts.

Sherlock wakes up near the burnt-out wreckage of his family's old house. He speaks to the girl in the aeroplane to guide her in landing safely. John wakes up chained at the bottom of a well. As Eurus raises the water level in the well, John finds a child's skull there. Sherlock realizes that what he thought was his dog Redbeard was his childhood friend, Victor Trevor. Redbeard was Trevor's name when they played as pirates, and Eurus threw him into the well and left him for dead because she felt left out of Sherlock's game.

Sherlock then figures out where Eurus is hiding by deciphering the real meaning of the song that Eurus had taunted him with when Victor went missing, which reveals that she wants him to find her. It is also revealed that the little girl on the aeroplane has been Eurus all along, and the game was a cry for help, for whenever she closes her eyes she's on the plane and all alone. After helping her and rescuing John, Sherlock sends her back to Sherrinford.

Mycroft explains to his and Sherlock's parents, who are furious that he told them Eurus was dead, that she refuses to speak to people anymore. Sherlock visits Eurus, and they play the violin together instead of talking. While helping Sherlock repair his destroyed flat, John finds another video sent by Mary before she died. Sherlock and John watch as Mary explains posthumously that, whatever kind of person they may be, they will always be her Baker Street Boys – "Sherlock Holmes and Doctor Watson", the series ending with the flat restored and the two resuming to their lives of solving mysteries.

== Sources ==
The title of the episode is a reference to "The Final Problem" (1893). The riddle presented by Eurus in the form of a song is a reference to "The Adventure of the Musgrave Ritual" (1893), which it directly references. Watson's mention of the east wind and the name of Eurus Holmes are a reference to "His Last Bow" (1917), where Holmes says, "There's an east wind coming, Watson." The three Garrideb brothers seen in a puzzle sequence are an adaptation of "The Adventure of the Three Garridebs" (1924). The character Victor Trevor is a reference to "The Adventure of the Gloria Scott" (1893), where he appears as Holmes' first ever close friend, albeit in university rather than in childhood. Jim Moriarty's brother is mentioned as a broadcast station master, a reference to The Valley of Fear (1915), where James Moriarty's brother is noted to be a railway station master. The message on the coffin lid is a reference to "The Disappearance of Lady Frances Carfax" (1911). The closing shot shows Holmes and Watson exiting "Rathbone Place", a reference to Basil Rathbone, who played Sherlock Holmes in fourteen films and a radio series.

In the final sequence, "The Adventure of the Dancing Men" (1903) is referenced with the following cipher seen on a chalkboard, which reads "AM HERE ABE SLANEY":

A diagram drawn by Conan Doyle

This idea (pictorial coded messages) was previously used as inspiration for the earlier series 1 episode The Blind Banker.

== Production ==
The setting for Sherrinford, the high-security prison, was filmed at St Catherine's Fort, St Catherine's Island off Castle Beach in Tenby, Pembrokeshire, Wales.

Musician Paul Weller made a cameo appearance, in a non-speaking role as a man lying on the floor in a Viking costume, seen near the end of the episode.

== Leak and investigation ==
On 14 January, one day before the episode's broadcast, it was released online with Russian dialogue. Both the official Sherlock Twitter account and members of the Sherlock team acknowledged this and asked people to not share it and keep the Internet free of spoilers.

On 16 January Channel One Russia, the network holding the rights to the broadcast in Russia, issued an apology, having determined that the material had been hacked from their system. Channel One Russia announced it was conducting an investigation, while BBC, through BBC Worldwide, announced its own full-scale investigation of the leak.

== Broadcast and reception ==
"The Final Problem" received mixed reviews from critics. Among the more positive reviews was Sean O'Grady of The Independent who gave the episode four out of five stars, stating that "Benedict Cumberbatch and Tim Freeman [sic] are their usual accomplished double act" although suggesting "Maybe Sherlock needs a little more reimagining". Meanwhile, Michael Hogan of The Daily Telegraph gave the episode five out of five stars, praising that "the dazzling script delivered laughs, excitement, and emotion .. we were left with a wiser Holmes and Watson." He also commented about the possibility of series 4 being the last series for Sherlock, stating "if this was the last-ever episode, which it surely won't be, it worked well as a sign off." Louisa Mellor of Den of Geek wrote "this was fun to watch. Fun and ultra-tense with a terrific, whooshing sense of momentum. It went like the clappers, held its breath, went like the clappers again, held its breath some more until you thought you might pass out with the dizziness." Neela Debnath of the Daily Express was also positive, writing "I can't fault the thrill ride that The Final Problem takes viewers on from the beginning to the end. Sherlock has clawed itself back from the edge." Two separate reviews in The Observer and The Guardian were positive, with one describing it as too byzantine, but "much better than it looked" and the other writing "with a visual swagger far beyond the budget – and including an eerily beautiful high-security violin duet for Sherlock and Eurus – this was a fine way to go."

However, some reviews were more critical. A third Guardian review was negative, stating Holmes had "become a parody of himself". Kaite Welsh of IndieWire scored the episode a grade of B−, writing "Steven Moffatt and Mark Gatiss wrap up their 13th episode on an elegiac note, musing on the legend that is Sherlock and Watson. It's just a shame the rest of the episode was such a mess, really". Ian Hyland of The Daily Mirror stated that he preferred it "when Holmes and Watson were just solving fairly believable mysteries. If it went back to that I'd welcome another series or two with open arms." He compared the series to the BBC series Taboo, suggesting that the latter would be a better television series for those who love Sherlock. Aja Romano of Vox also criticized the episode, praising the usual drama of Sherlock, but being critical of the fact that the episode "collapses into a muddled mess of melodrama and confusion ... there is even less logic." Romano considered the episode to be an anticlimax, saying "the episode feels like a window dressing on a completely different story."

Issues of representation within the episode were raised by some commentators. Gavia Baker-Whitelaw of The Daily Dot called the episode the "most sexist" of the TV show. She noted that Eurus, a stereotypical female villain, "ticks every box for the kind of madwoman who gets locked up in an asylum in a 19th century melodrama" and commits crimes only motivated "by a desire for male attention."
