= Tenby =

Seaside town and community in Pembrokeshire, Wales

Tenby: Welsh: Dinbych-y-pysgod
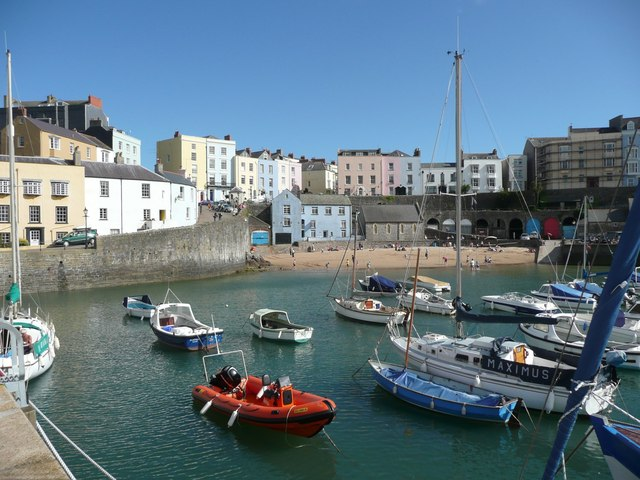
- The harbour and old town

- Location within Pembrokeshire
- Population: 4,696 (2011 census)
- OS grid reference: SN129007
- Community: Tenby
- Principal area: Pembrokeshire
- Preserved county: Dyfed
- Country: Wales
- Sovereign state: United Kingdom
- Post town: TENBY
- Postcode district: SA70
- Dialling code: 01834
- Police: Dyfed-Powys
- Fire: Mid and West Wales
- Ambulance: Welsh
- UK Parliament: Mid and South Pembrokeshire
- Senedd Cymru – Welsh Parliament: Ceredigion Penfro
- Website: www.aroundtenby.co.uk
- List of places UK Wales Pembrokeshire 51°40′24″N 4°42′18″W Map of the community

Tenby (Welsh: Dinbych-y-pysgod, lit. 'fortlet of the fish') is a seaside town and community in the county of Pembrokeshire, Wales. It lies within Carmarthen Bay. In 2011, it had a population of 4,696.

Notable features include three miles (five kilometres) of sandy beaches and the Pembrokeshire Coast Path, the 13th-century medieval town walls, including the Five Arches barbican gatehouse, Tenby Museum and Art Gallery, the 15th-century St. Mary's Church, and the National Trust's Tudor Merchant's House.

Boats sail from Tenby's harbour to the offshore monastic Caldey Island. St Catherine's Island is tidal and has a 19th-century Palmerston Fort.

The town has an operating railway station. The A478 road from Cardigan, Ceredigion, connects Tenby with the M4 via the A477, the A40 and the A48 in approximately 40 miles (60 kilometres).

== History ==
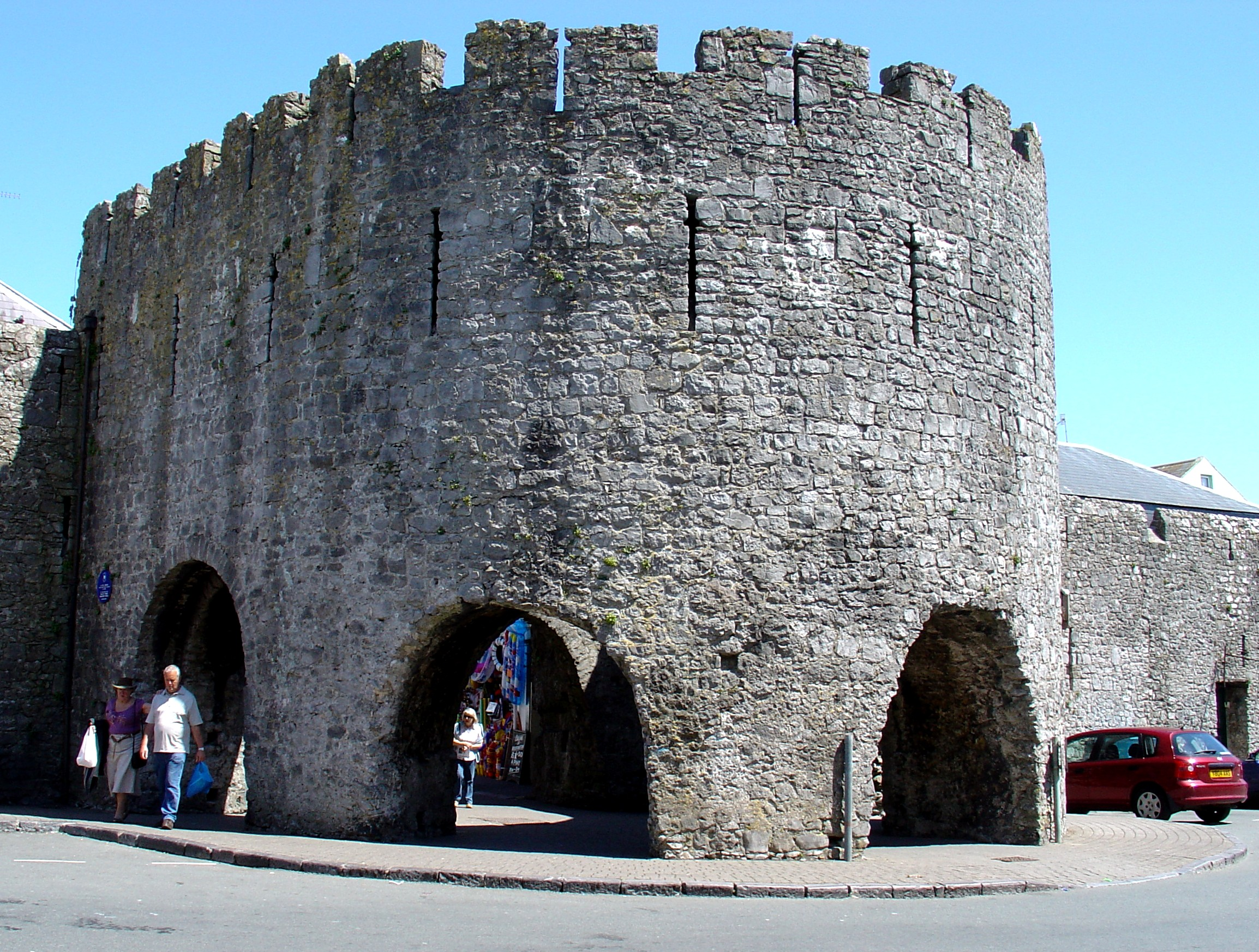
Five Arches Gate

=== Middle Ages ===
With its strategic position on the far west coast of Britain, and a natural sheltered harbour from both the Atlantic Ocean and the Irish Sea, Tenby was a natural settlement point, probably a hill fort with the mercantile nature of the settlement possibly developing under Hiberno-Norse influence. The earliest reference to a settlement at Tenby is in Etmic Dinbych, a poem probably from the ninth century.

Tenby was taken by the Normans when they invaded West Wales in the early 12th century. The town's first stone-wall fortification was on Castle Hill. Tenby's mercantile trade grew as it developed as a major seaport in Norman-controlled Little England beyond Wales.

Flemish settlers from Tenby tried to assassinate Cadell ap Gruffydd, the Welsh prince of Deheubarth, after which the settlement and castle were successfully attacked and sacked by his brothers Maredudd and Rhys in 1150 highlighting the need for additional defences. Sacking of the town was repeated in 1187 and again by Llywelyn ap Gruffudd in 1260.

After the 1260 attack, the Earl of Pembroke at the time, William de Valence, ordered the completion of the Tenby town walls. The stone curtain wall, towers, and gates enclosed a large part of the settlement—now known as the "old town". In the Late Middle Ages, Tenby was awarded royal grants to finance the maintenance and improvement of its defences and the enclosure of its harbour. With the construction of the town walls, Tenby Castle was made obsolete and had been abandoned by the end of the 14th century. William de Valence granted Tenby a charter in 1290.

=== Wars of the Roses ===
In 1452, King Henry VI gave the Marcher Lordship (and associated Earldom) to Jasper Tudor, his half-brother and uncle to the future Henry Tudor. In 1457, Tudor agreed to divide the costs of refurbishing and improving Tenby's defences with the town's merchants because of its economic importance to this part of Wales. Improvements included widening the dry ditch along the outside of the town walls to 30 feet (9.1 m), raising the wall's height to include a second tier of higher arrow slits behind a new parapet walk and adding additional turret towers to the ends of the walls where they abutted the cliff edges.

Traders sailed along the coast to Bristol and Ireland and further afield to France, Spain, and Portugal. Exports included wool, skins, canvas, coal, iron, and oil. It was during this period that the town was so busy and important; it was considered to be a national port. During the Wars of the Roses, Henry Tudor, the future King Henry VII of England, sheltered at Tenby before sailing into exile in 1471.

=== Tudors and the Civil War ===
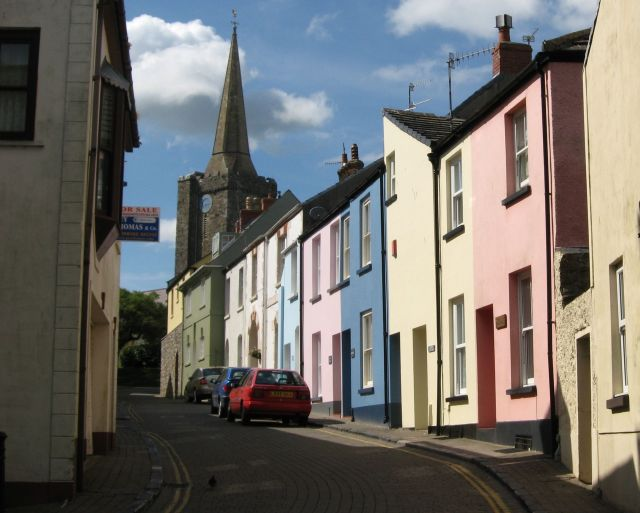
St Mary's Street, a typical old town street in Tenby

In the mid-16th century, the large D-shaped tower formerly known as the "Five Arches tavern" was built following fears of a second Spanish Armada. Tenby was formally incorporated as a borough by Elizabeth I in 1581.

Two key events caused the town to undergo a rapid and permanent decline in importance. First, Tenby declared for Parliament in the English Civil War. It resisted two attempts by the Royalists forces of Charles Gerard, who took most of the rest of South Wales. However, in the Second English Civil War the commander of Tenby Castle declared for the King in 1648, although ten weeks later the shattered town was surrendered to the parliamentarian Colonel Thomas Horton, who welcomed Oliver Cromwell shortly afterwards. Second, a plague outbreak killed half of the town's remaining population in 1650.

With limited infrastructure, resources, and people, the town's economy fell into decline. Most of the merchant and business class left, resulting in the town's decay and ruin. By the end of the 18th century, John Wesley noted during his visit how: "Two-thirds of the old town is in ruins or has entirely vanished. Pigs roam among the abandoned houses, and Tenby presents a dismal spectacle."

=== The Paxton Revival ===
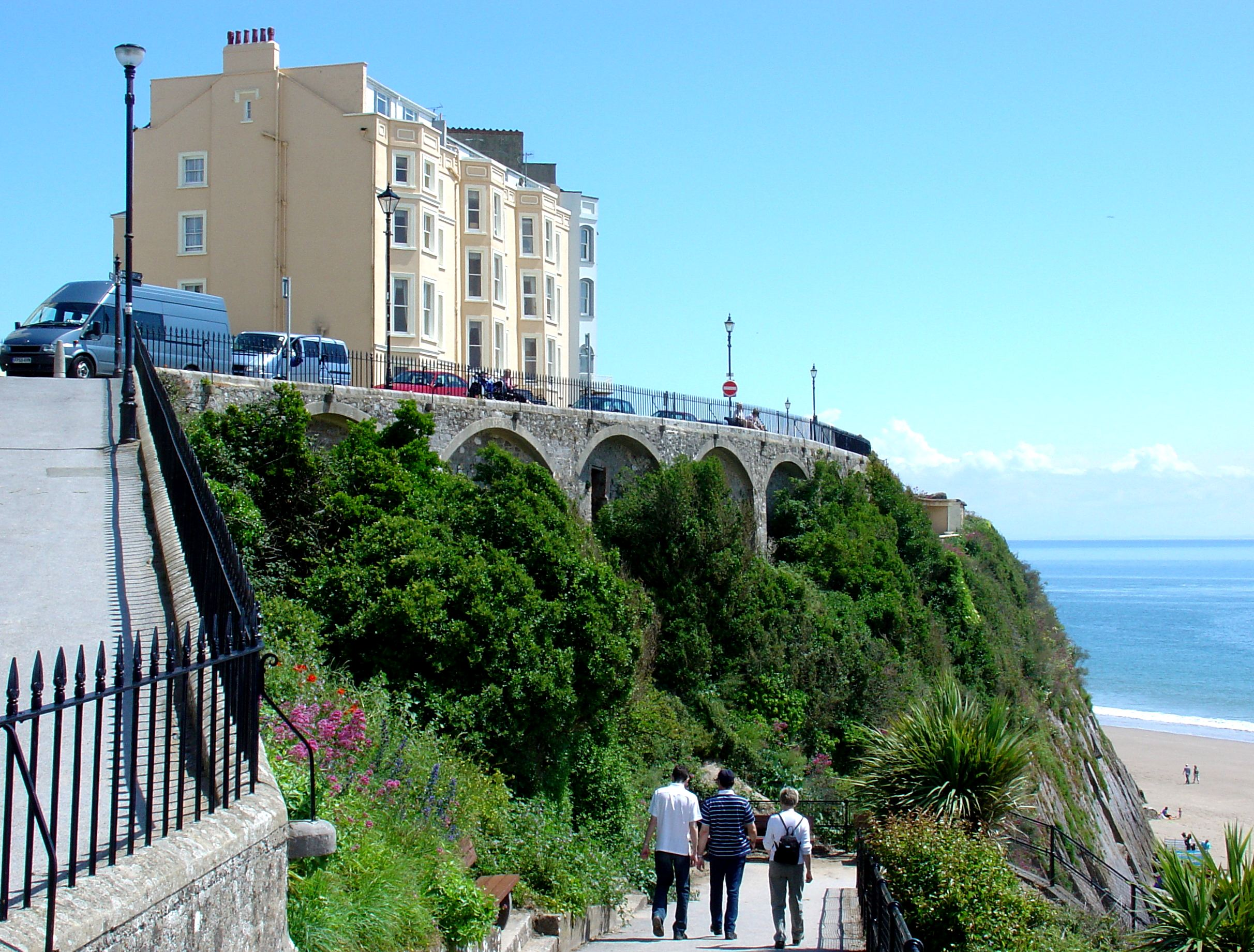
View upwards to the promenade, showing the 1814 arched road built during the town's revival by Sir William Paxton

Another war led to a resurgence in Tenby's fortunes. Since 1798, the French General Napoleon Bonaparte had begun conquering Europe, restricting the rich British upper classes from making their Grand Tours to continental spa towns. In 1802, local resident, merchant banker and politician, Sir William Paxton, bought his first property in the old town. From this point onwards, he invested heavily in the area with the full approval of the town council.

With the growth in saltwater sea-bathing for health purposes, Paxton engaged engineer James Grier and architect Samuel Pepys Cockerell (the same team who had built his home at Middleton Hall) to create a "fashionable bathing establishment suitable for the highest society." His sea-bathing baths came into operation in July 1806 and, after acquiring the Globe Inn, transformed it into "a most lofty, elegant and convenient style" to lodge the more elegant visitors to his baths. Cottages were erected adjoining the baths with adjoining livery stables and a coach house.

A road was built on arches overlooking the harbour at Paxton's full expense in 1814. He had a private act of Parliament passed that enabled fresh water to be piped through the town. Despite these accomplishments, his 1809 theatre was closed in 1818 due to lack of patronage. The Market Hall was completed in 1829 and remodelled to serve as Tenby Town Hall in 1860.

Paxton also took in "tour" developments in the area as required by rich Victorian tourists. This included the discovery of a chalybeate spring in his own park at Middleton Hall, and coaching inns from Swansea to Narberth. He built Paxton's Tower, in memorial to Lord Nelson, whom he had met in 1802 when mayor of Carmarthen. Paxton's efforts to revive the town succeeded, and after the Battle of Trafalgar, the growth of Victorian Tenby was inevitable.

=== Fashionable Resort ===
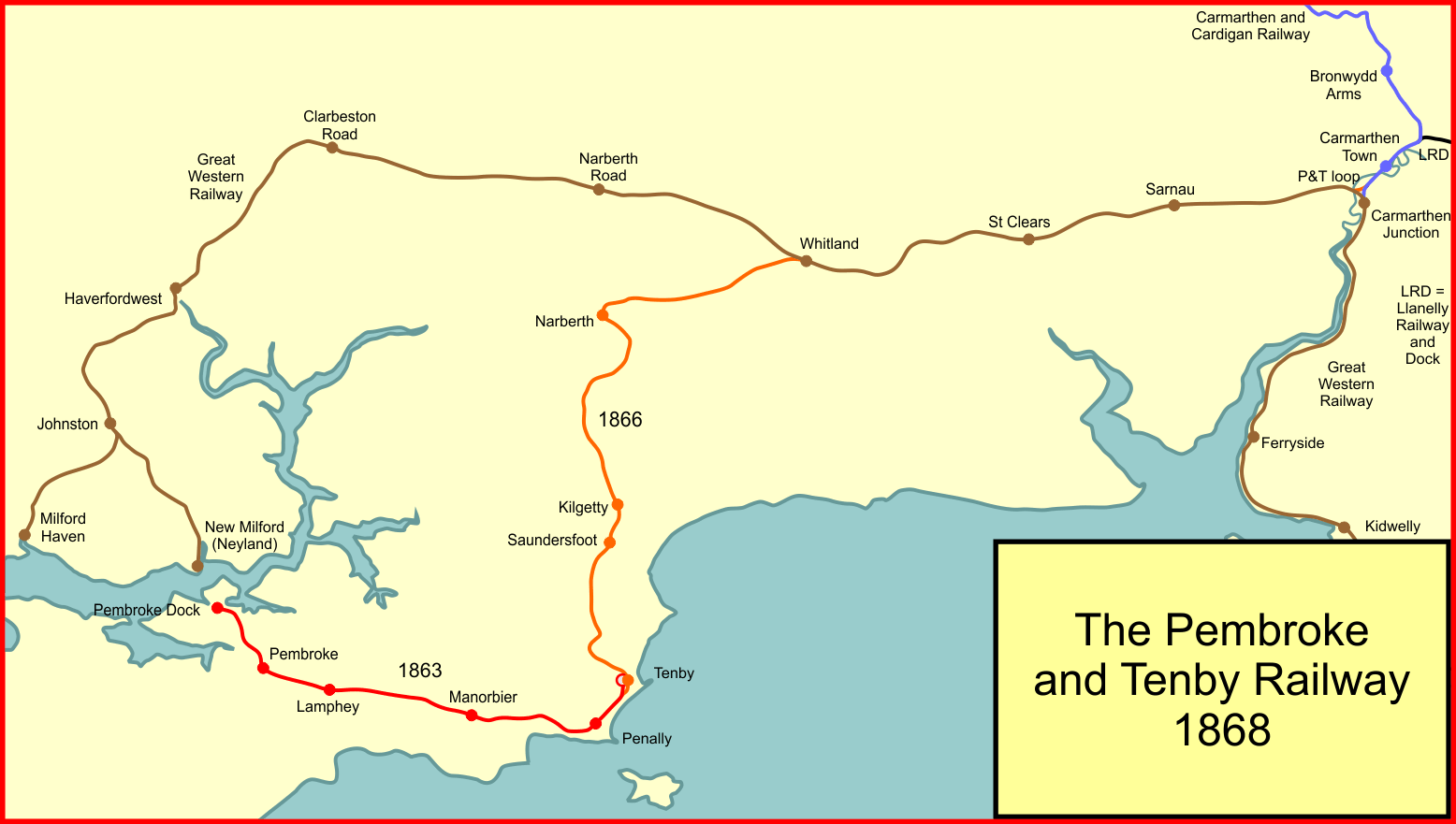
Pembroke and Tenby Railway (1868)

The borough was reformed to become a municipal borough in 1836.

Through both the Georgian and Victorian eras, Tenby was renowned as a health resort and centre for botanical and geological study. With many features of the town being constructed to provide areas for healthy seaside walks, due to the walkways being built to accommodate Victorian nannies pushing prams, many of the beaches today still retain good disabled access. In 1856, the writer Mary Ann Evans (pen-name George Eliot) accompanied George Henry Lewes to Tenby to gather materials for his work Seaside Studies published in 1858.

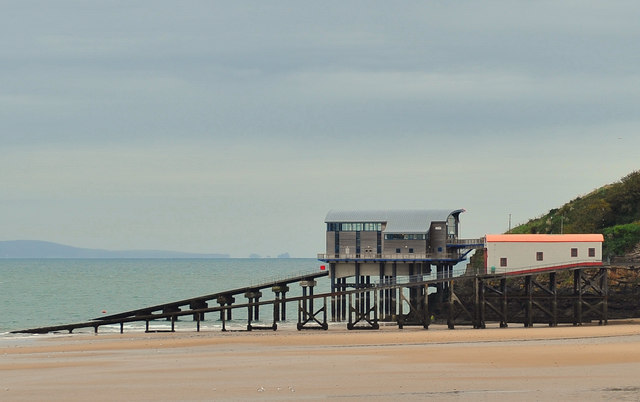
The old 1905 (cream & red) and new 2008 (silver) RNLI Tenby Lifeboat Station

In 1852, the Shipwrecked Fishermen and Mariners' Royal Benevolent Society deployed a lifeboat to the town, taken over in 1854 by the Royal National Lifeboat Institution. In 1905, a slip-way equipped lifeboat station was built on Castle Hill. It was replaced by a modern station in 2008.

Tenby railway station and the Pembroke and Tenby Railway were opened as far as Pembroke on 30 July 1863. The extended line to Pembroke Dock opened on 8 August 1864. In 1866, the line was connected to Whitland railway station. In 1867, work began on the construction of the Palmerston Fort on St Catherine's Island. The Army had control of the fort during 1887–1895.

=== Twentieth Century ===
From 1860 until 1947, the borough council was based at Tenby Town Hall on High Street. In 1947 the council moved to Croft House on The Norton, later renaming it Guildhall. Tenby Borough Council was abolished under the Local Government Act 1972, with a less powerful Tenby Town Council taking over. The borough powers were subsumed into a new district of South Pembrokeshire within the county of Dyfed on 1 April 1974, although both the county and district were abolished in 1996 with Tenby became part of a re-established County of Pembrokeshire. The town council left the guildhall for new offices in the mid-1980s.

Sections of the old town walls have survived, as does the Victorian revival architecture in a pastel colour scheme. The economy is based on tourism, supported by a range of craft, art, and other stores. As of April 2017, there are 372 listed buildings and other structures in and around Tenby.

== Governance ==
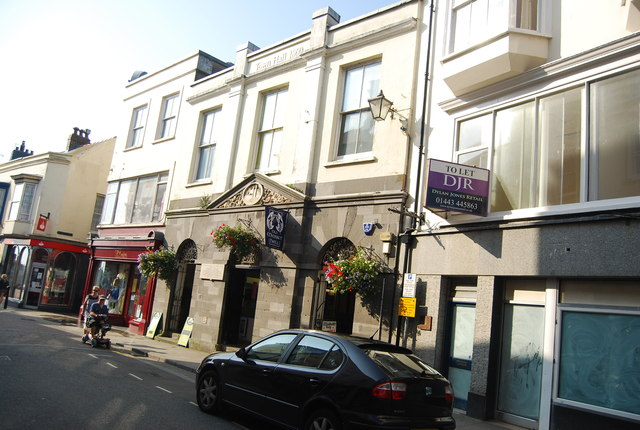
Tenby Town Hall

There are two tiers of local government covering Tenby, at community (town) and county level: Tenby Town Council and Pembrokeshire County Council.

Although Tenby was an ancient borough since 1290 it is now classed as community was established to cover the area of the former borough, with its council taking the name Tenby Town Council. The town council is based at the De Valence Pavilion on Upper Frog Street.

== Education ==
There are four schools in the Tenby schools area, consisting of three primary schools and one secondary school: Ysgol Hafan-y-Mor, Tenby Church in Wales Primary School, St. Teilo's RC School and Ysgol Greenhill Secondary.

Pupils from St. Teilo's School and Tenby Church in Wales School are automatically enrolled in the Greenhill School, but parents can enrol them in a different school. Ysgol Hafan y Môr is a Welsh language medium school. Most of the pupils go on to Ysgol y Preseli, a Welsh-medium secondary school in Crymych.

Previous schools in the area were Tenby V.C. Infants School, which was an English medium school with a Welsh unit. Pupils from this school would automatically enrol in Tenby Junior School, which has now been converted into Ysgol Hafan y Môr. Tenby V.C. Infant school was demolished in 2016 and turned into a field for the nearby Greenhill School.

== Culture ==
Tenby has been home to a number of artists, who have been exhibited variously in their own spaces or in commercial galleries, or in the Tenby Museum and Art Gallery.

In common with the rest of Wales, a range of genres of music is celebrated here. Beginning in 2025, Y Lle Da / The Good Place festival puts on a weekend of concerts in March and the Tenby International Music Festival (in partnership with the Wyoming International Chamber Music Festival) provides a Composer Fellowship programme and a series of chamber music concerts in August. A Blues festival takes place in November.

== Tourism ==
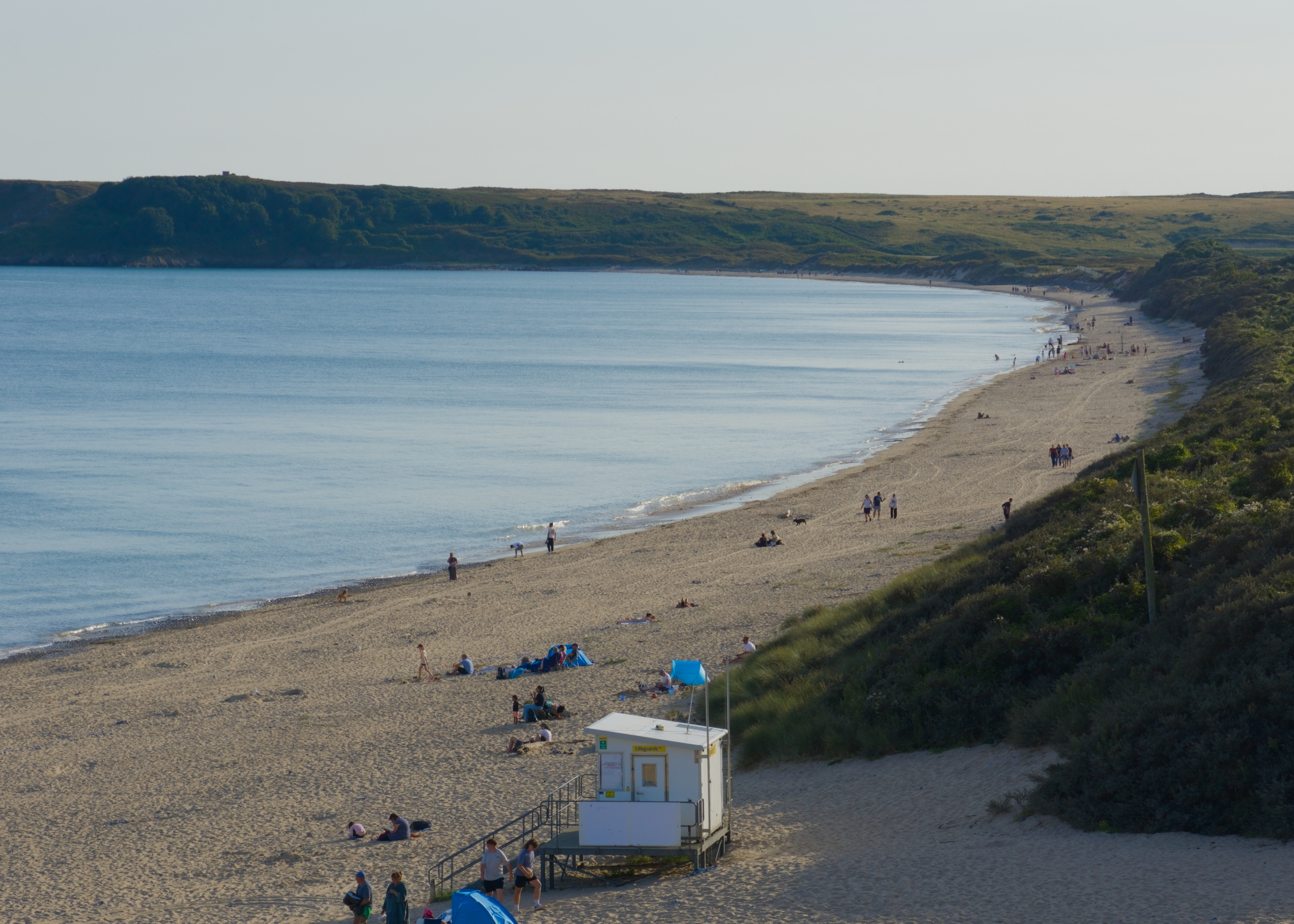
South Beach

Attractions include the two sheltered, sandy beaches and the coastal boat trips to Caldey Island. St Catherine's Island is tidal and the site of St Catherine's Fort a 19th-century Palmerston Fort. Tenby has shops, pubs, and restaurants that cater to visitors. The Sunday Times rated Tenby's Castle Beach the best beach in the UK in 2019.

== Transport ==
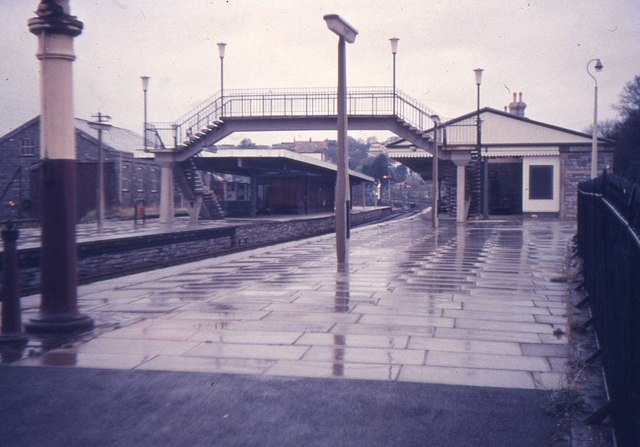
Tenby railway station (1967)

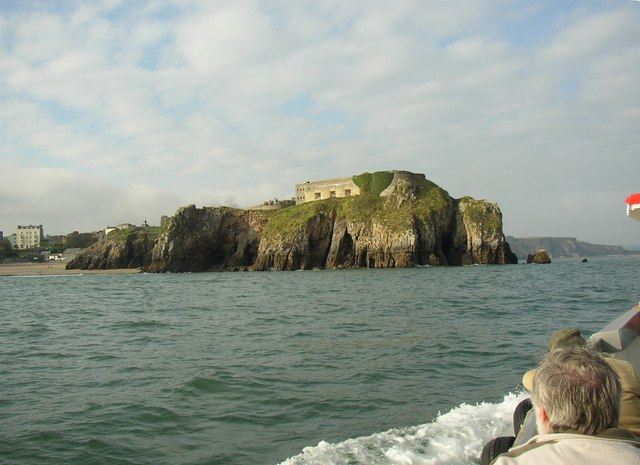
St Catherine's Island, viewed from the Caldey Island ferry

Tenby railway station serves the town on the Pembroke Dock branch of the West Wales Line operated by Transport for Wales Rail, who also manage the station. Trains run in each direction; westwards towards Pembroke and eastwards to Whitland, Carmarthen and Swansea. In peak season, trains run direct from Paddington to Tenby on Saturdays.

Buses are mainly run by First Cymru, although National Express and Taf Valley Coaches also run services in the town.

The nearest airport is Cardiff International.

== Sport ==
Tenby United RFC, a rugby union club has existed since 1876. It is a member of the Welsh Rugby Union.

In 1970, the Tenby Sea Swimming Association started the Boxing Day Swim. Each swimmer who enters for a charity receives a medal.

Tenby hosts the Welsh Ironman Triathlon in September. There is also the Tenby Aces Cycling Club and the 18-hole Tenby Golf Course that provides links golf by the coast.

== Notable residents ==
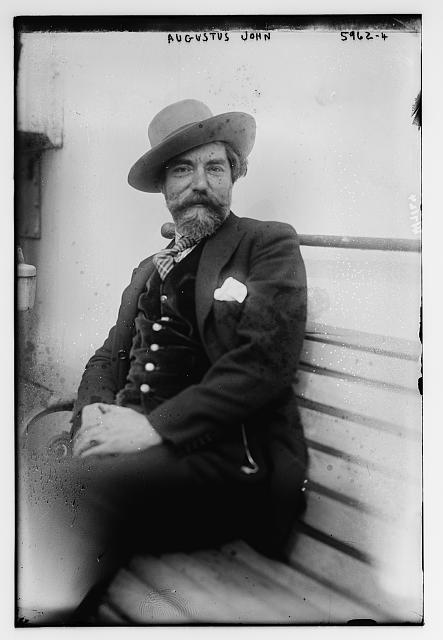
Augustus John, 1928, Time magazine

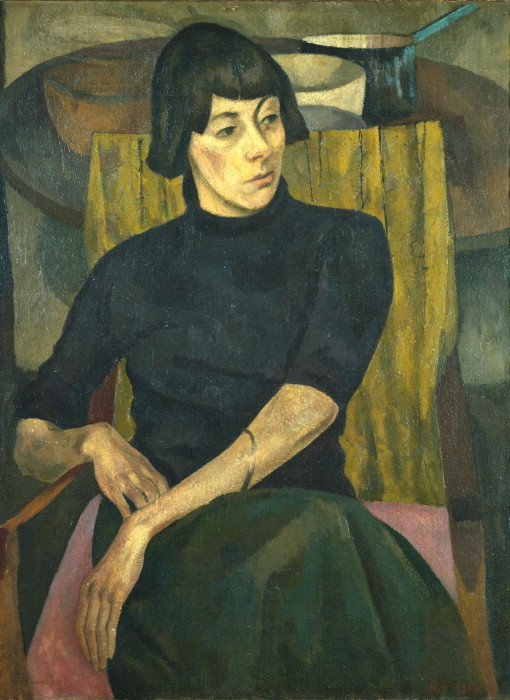
Nina Hamnett, 1917

- Robert Recorde (c. 1512 – 1558), Anglo-Welsh physician and mathematician.
- Sir William Paxton (1744−1824), Scottish-born sailor, businessman and Welsh MP for Carmarthen; he developed Tenby into a seaside resort.
- Charles Norris (1779–1858), English topographical etcher and writer; moved to Tenby in 1810.
- David Thomas (1813–1894), preacher and publisher of The Homilist, a magazine of liturgical thought.
- George Edward Day (1815–1872), Welsh physician.
- Fanny Price-Gwynne (1819–1901), Welsh novelist, artist, composer, poet and philanthropist; born in Tenby.
- Thomas Purnell (1834–1889), author and London drama critic; born in Tenby.
- Ernle Chatfield, 1st Baron Chatfield (1873–1967), senior Royal Navy officer during WW1, educated at St Andrew's School, Tenby
- Gwen John (1876–1939), Welsh artist who worked in France
- Augustus John (1878–1961), Welsh painter, draughtsman and etcher; born in Tenby.
- Tenby Davies (1884–1932), Welsh athlete and half-mile world professional champion in 1909
- J. Ernest James B.D. (1884–1945), Congregational minister in Australia
- Nina Hamnett (1890–1956), Welsh artist and writer, became known as the Queen of Bohemia; born in Tenby
- Dick Rees (1894-1951), five-time champion jump jockey, raised in Tenby
- Cecil Woodham-Smith (1896–1977), historian and biographer; she wrote about the Victorian era
- Kenneth Griffith (1921–2006), Welsh actor and documentary filmmaker; born in Tenby
- Alison Bielski (1925–2014), poet and writer; wrote about Tenby
- Gwilym Prichard (1931–2015), Welsh landscape painter, lived and died in Tenby
- Clive Merrison (born 1945), British actor of film, TV, stage, and radio; born in Tenby
- Rosie Swale-Pope (born 1946), British author, adventurer, and marathon runner; lives in Tenby
- Michael Bonacini (born 1960), Welsh-Canadian chef, born and raised in Tenby
- Grant Llewellyn (born 1960), Welsh conductor and music director of the North Carolina Symphony
- Rhidian Brook (born 1964), Welsh novelist, screenwriter, and broadcaster; born in Tenby
- Kate Lamb (born 1988), actress, grew up in Tenby.

== Freedom of the Town ==
The following people and military units have received the Freedom of the Town of Tenby.

=== Individuals ===
- David Lloyd George
- Augustus John: 30 October 1959.
- Wilfred Harrison: 1969.
- Sue Lane: 10 May 2023.
- Cllr Trevor Hallett: 10 May 2023.

=== Military Units ===
- HMS Tenby, RN: 1970.

== Climate ==
Tenby experiences a maritime climate with cool summers, mild winters, and often high winds. Due to its coastal southwest position, it is one of the sunnier locations in Wales.

Climate data for Tenby (1991–2020 normals, extremes 1977-2023)
Month	Jan	Feb	Mar	Apr	May	Jun	Jul	Aug	Sep	Oct	Nov	Dec	Year
Record high °C (°F)	14.7 (58.5)	13.5 (56.3)	19.3 (66.7)	21.0 (69.8)	25.5 (77.9)	29.0 (84.2)	30.7 (87.3)	29.9 (85.8)	27.2 (81.0)	21.3 (70.3)	17.8 (64.0)	14.8 (58.6)	30.7 (87.3)
Mean daily maximum °C (°F)	8.9 (48.0)	8.9 (48.0)	10.3 (50.5)	12.6 (54.7)	15.4 (59.7)	17.8 (64.0)	19.6 (67.3)	19.5 (67.1)	17.7 (63.9)	14.8 (58.6)	11.9 (53.4)	9.7 (49.5)	14.0 (57.2)
Daily mean °C (°F)	6.2 (43.2)	6.1 (43.0)	7.2 (45.0)	9.2 (48.6)	11.8 (53.2)	14.3 (57.7)	16.1 (61.0)	16.0 (60.8)	14.3 (57.7)	11.8 (53.2)	8.8 (47.8)	6.9 (44.4)	10.7 (51.3)
Mean daily minimum °C (°F)	3.5 (38.3)	3.3 (37.9)	4.1 (39.4)	5.7 (42.3)	8.1 (46.6)	10.7 (51.3)	12.5 (54.5)	12.5 (54.5)	10.9 (51.6)	8.8 (47.8)	5.8 (42.4)	4.0 (39.2)	7.5 (45.5)
Record low °C (°F)	−8.4 (16.9)	−7.7 (18.1)	−5.8 (21.6)	−3.7 (25.3)	−2.3 (27.9)	1.0 (33.8)	3.8 (38.8)	4.1 (39.4)	0.7 (33.3)	−3.0 (26.6)	−6.7 (19.9)	−8.7 (16.3)	−8.7 (16.3)
Average precipitation mm (inches)	119.3 (4.70)	85.5 (3.37)	77.6 (3.06)	66.3 (2.61)	64.0 (2.52)	68.1 (2.68)	72.4 (2.85)	99.9 (3.93)	82.5 (3.25)	123.8 (4.87)	143.3 (5.64)	133.3 (5.25)	1,136 (44.72)
Average precipitation days (≥ 1.0 mm)	16.1	13.0	12.4	10.6	9.8	9.8	10.2	11.7	11.1	15.1	17.4	16.6	153.8
Mean monthly sunshine hours	60.2	83.2	123.8	184.8	221.4	214.8	204.7	191.6	150.8	109.2	68.2	53.6	1,666.1
Source 1: Met Office
Source 2: Starlings Roost Weather

== See also ==
- Allen's of Tenby
