= St Catherine's Island =

Small tidal island off Tenby, Pembrokeshire, Wales

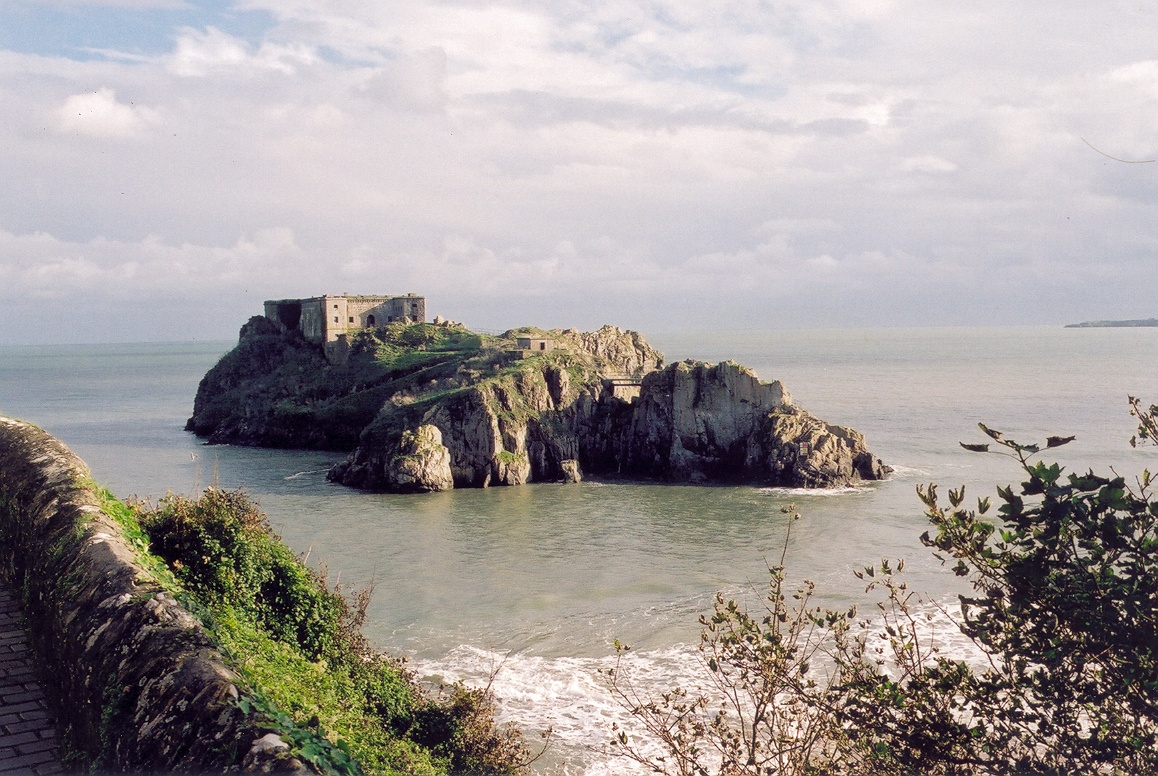
- St Catherine's Island, Tenby. Taken from Castle Hill, Tenby.

- Location within Pembrokeshire

Geography
- Location: Tenby
- Coordinates: 51°40′14″N 4°41′32″W
- Length: 0.2 km (0.12 mi)
- Width: 0.06 km (0.037 mi)
- Highest elevation: 34 m (112 ft)

Administration
- Wales
- County: Pembrokeshire

St Catherine's Island (Welsh: Ynys Catrin) is a small tidal island linked to Tenby in Pembrokeshire, Wales, by Castle beach at low tide. The island, which is known colloquially as St Catherine's Rock, is the location of St Catherine's Fort.

== History ==
The Earl of Pembroke owned St Catherine's Island until the reign of Elizabeth I. Later, ownership passed to the Corporation of Tenby, which took possession of a number of crown lands. It is recorded in 1856 that a few sheep inhabited the island. An observer described them as "half wild sure footed creatures that run, turn and look, run again and leap from crag to crag almost with the agility of the Alpine Chamois".

For many centuries a tiny church was the only building on the island. The construction of St Catherine's Fort in 1867 necessitated the demolishing of the remains of the church.

A family trust has owned the island since 1962. The island operated as a zoo from March 1968 to 1979. In April 2014 the island was opened to the public for visits and tours. It was closed from Saturday 27 August 2016 to 12 April 2017 and remains open to the public as of 2019.

In 2016 The Final Problem, the third and last episode of the fourth series of the BBC TV series Sherlock was filmed on the island, with it standing in as a maximum security prison.

== Geography ==
Formed from an outcrop of limestone, on average 25m high, the island is riddled with tidal caves. The island is approximately 200 metres (660 ft) long and 60 metres (200 ft) wide.

The area below the high waterline at St Catherine's Island is a Site of Special Scientific Interest. The stretch directly in front of the island is known as the Catterns.
