= Tenby Harbour =

Small harbour in Pembrokeshire, Wales

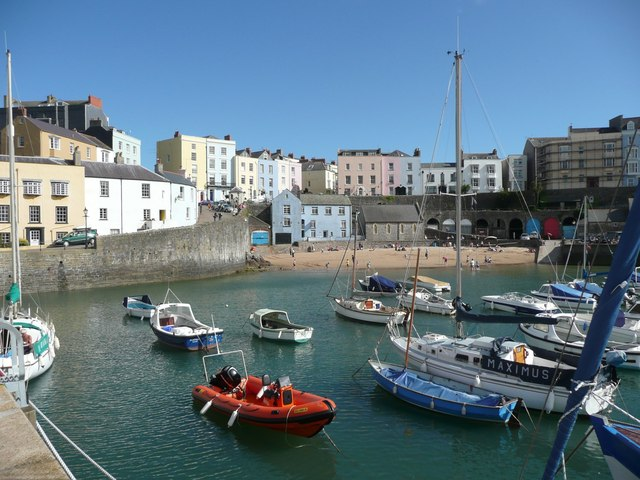
- The harbour and old town
- Interactive map of Tenby Harbour
- Native name: Dinbych-y-pysgod

Location
- Country: Wales
- Location: Tenby, Pembrokeshire
- Coordinates: 51.672624°N 4.697456°W

Details
- Type of harbour: coastal natural

Tenby Harbour is a naturally sheltered and improved harbour for the town of Tenby in Pembrokeshire on the south coast of Wales. It lies within Carmarthen Bay and faces both the Atlantic Ocean and the Irish Sea. Boats sail from there to the offshore monastic Caldey Island.

== History ==
With its strategic position on the far west coast of Britain the harbour made Tenby a natural place to settle, initially with a local focus but developing wider trading links under Hiberno-Norse influence.

Throughout the fourteenth and fifteenth centuries Tenby received various royal grants to finance the enclosure of the harbour as well as improving the town walls.

Traders sailed along the coast to Bristol and Ireland and further afield to France, Spain and Portugal. Exports included wool, skins, canvas, coal, iron and oil; while in 1566 it is believed that Portuguese seamen landed the first oranges in Wales. It was during this period that the town was so busy and important, it was considered to be a national port. During the Wars of the Roses Henry Tudor, the future King Henry VII of England secretly sailed into exile from the harbour in 1471. There then followed a long period of decline attenuated by civil war and plague.

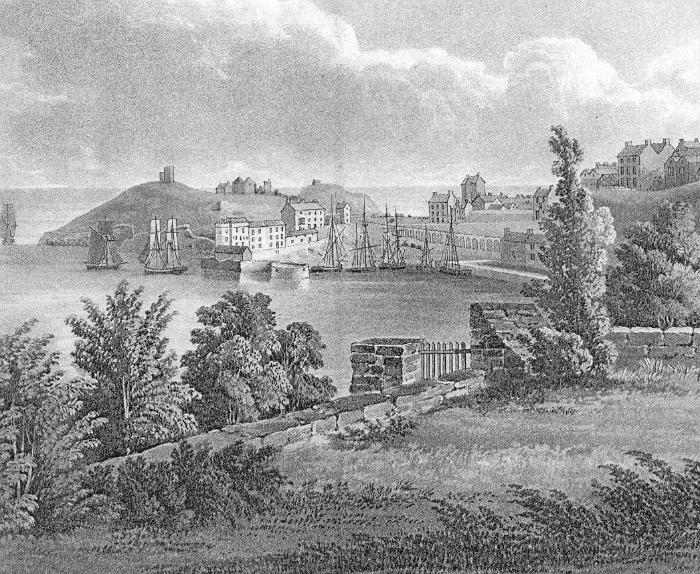
Tenby Harbour, 1817. Charles Norris

The Napoleonic Wars led to a resurgence in Tenby's fortunes with the restrictions the wars imposed on the rich British upper classes from making their Grand Tours to continental spa towns. In 1802 a rich local merchant banker Sir William Paxton started heavily investing in Tenby with the full approval of the town council. In 1805 he leased land surrounding the harbour to build salt water baths and Assembly rooms. A road was built on arches overlooking the harbour at Paxton's full expense in 1814 which allowed the bath house clientele to view the harbour without mixing with the public or the dock workers.

In 1852, the Shipwrecked Fishermen and Mariners' Royal Benevolent Society deployed a lifeboat to the town, taken over in 1854 by the Royal National Lifeboat Institution which in 1905 was moved from the Harbour to Castle Hill.

St Catherine's Fort was built in 1870 as a Palmerston Fort to protect against the French, with guns facing north covering the harbour as well as the beach towards Saundersfoot.

From 19 March 2021, an Arctic walrus called Wally was spotted in Tenby. The RSPCA believed that his sighting in Tenby was to that point the most southernly sighting of the species before he moved to Padstow in Cornwall.
