= St Mary's Church, Tenby =

Church in Tenby, Wales

Coordinates: 51.672°N 4.7°W

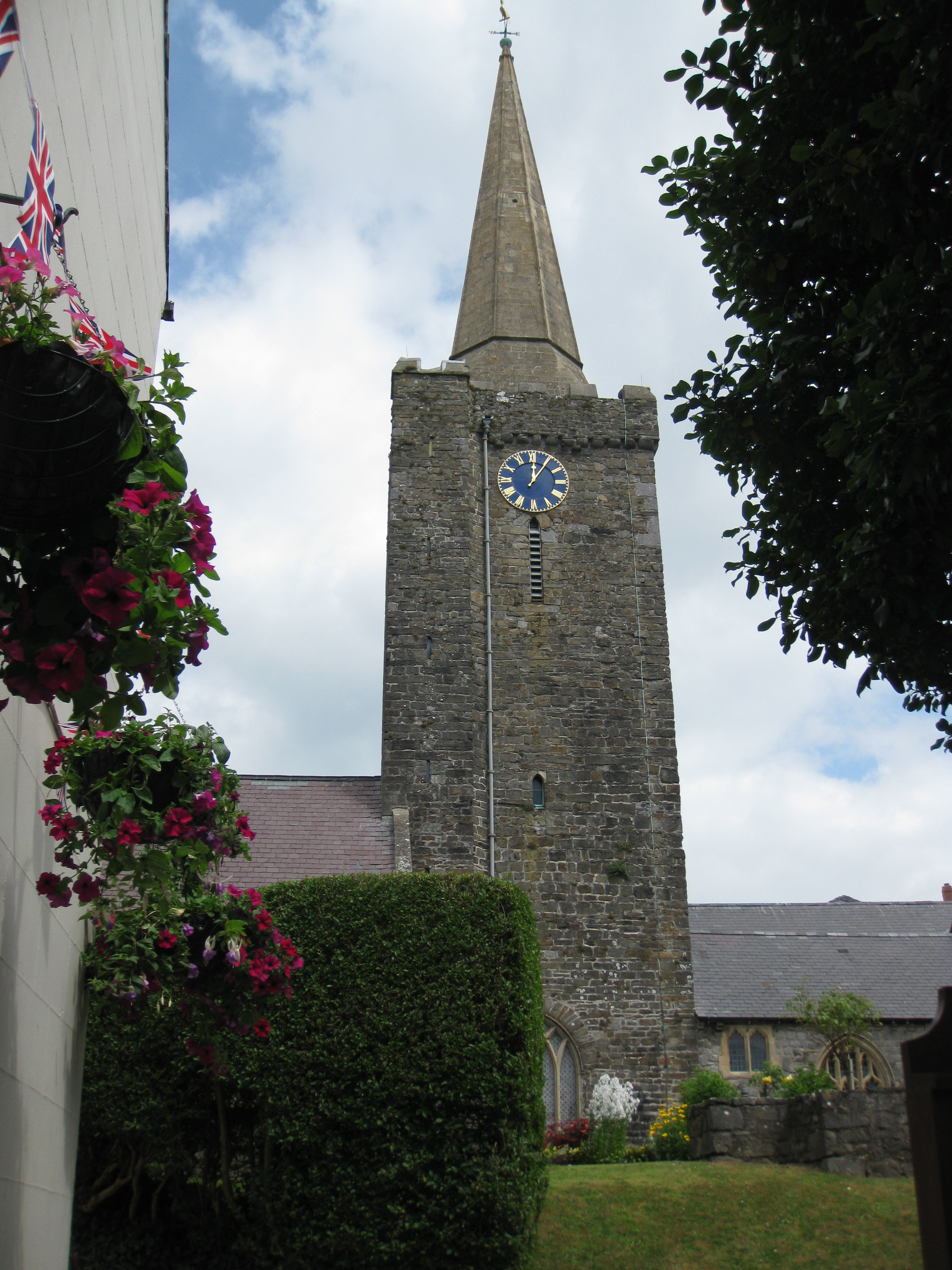
The spire of St Mary's Church, Tenby

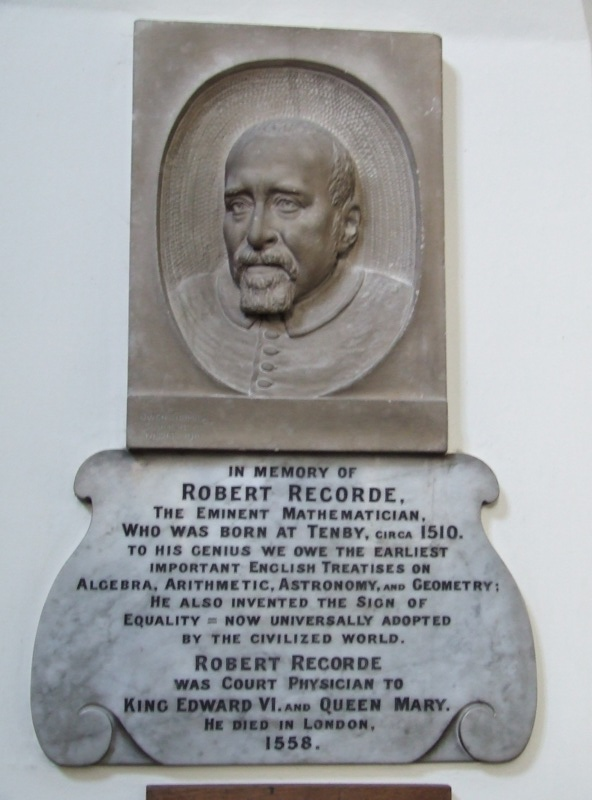
Memorial to Robert Recorde in St Mary's Church, Tenby

St Mary's Church, Tenby is a church located in the centre of the town of Tenby in Pembrokeshire, western Wales. The Anglican church is in the Diocese of Saint David's within the Church in Wales. It is the parish church for St Mary In Liberty (the borough and town) and St Mary Out Liberty (the rural area to the north).

== History and description ==
There is believed to have been a church on the site since Norman times, and Gerald of Wales is counted as the earliest Rector of Tenby. The majority of the remaining building dates from the 15th century with some features retained from the 13th century.

The 13th Century chancel has a 'wagon' roof and the panelled ceiling has 75 bosses carved in a variety of designs including foliage, grotesques, fishes, a mermaid, and a green man, as well as the figure of Jesus surrounded by the four Apostles. St. Thomas' Chapel was added in the mid-15th Century, and the St. Nicholas Chapel was added c. 1485. The spire is also a 15th-century addition. Inside the church is a 15th-century font and a 15th-century bell, cast with the letters 'Sancta Anna'.

The tower is positioned to one side of the chancel and dates from the late 13th century. The first floor served as a chapel, and still has a stone altar and piscina in place.

The church has two fonts, one dating from the 15th century and another late Gothic example from the 19th century.

The church contains several memorials, including the tombs of Thomas and John White, both Mayors of Tenby in the fifteenth century. Thomas White was famous for hiding a young Henry Tudor from King Richard III.

There is also a wall tablet in memory of Robert Recorde, an Elizabethan scholar, who introduced the equals sign ( = ) to mathematical calculation, and another to James Sleeman, the son of William Henry Sleeman, who managed to suppress the Thuggee movement in India.

The church was Grade I listed in 1951 as being "an outstanding late medieval church with exceptional roofs and monuments".

In the churchyard, 20 metres west of the church, are the remains of what is believed to be a late 15th-century choir school or college. The wall includes a pointed arched doorway. These remains are Grade II* listed.
