= The Shipwrecked Fishermen and Mariners' Royal Benevolent Society =

British charitable organization

Shipwrecked Mariners' Society
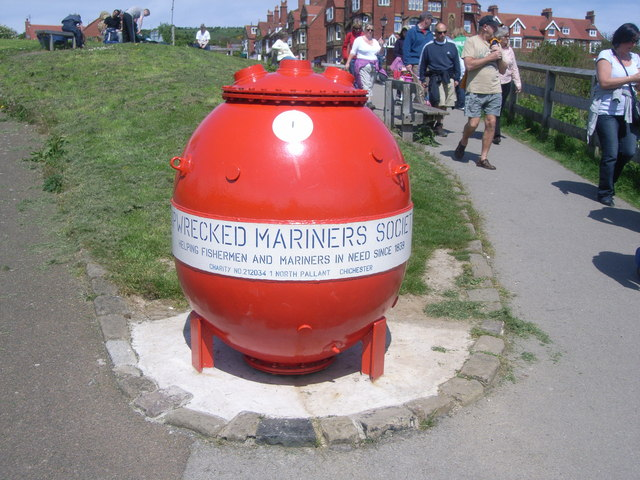
- A decommissioned mine used as a collecting box for the Shipwrecked Mariners' Society
- Formation: 1850
- Purpose: Humanitarian
- Headquarters: Chichester
- Region served: United Kingdom
- Official language: English
- President: Admiral George Zambellas
- Website: Shipwrecked Mariners' Society
- Formerly called: The Shipwrecked Fishermen and Mariners' Royal Benevolent Society

The Shipwrecked Fishermen and Mariners' Royal Benevolent Society or the Shipwrecked Mariners Society for short, is a national charity founded in 1839, which operates throughout the United Kingdom and Ireland, whose purpose is to provide help to former merchant seamen, fishermen and their widows and dependants who are in need. The Society, which operates through a national network of volunteers known as Honorary Agents, deals with over 2,000 cases of need a year and is based in Chichester, West Sussex.

== History ==
John Rye (left) and Charles Gee Jones shown discussing the shipwreck tragedy which led to the founding of the Society.

The society was founded at the instigation of Mr. John Rye, (married to Ann, a daughter of Sir Berney Brograve, 1st Baronet), a philanthropic retired medical man of Bath, Somerset and his servant Mr. Charles Gee Jones, born in Weston-super-Mare, a former Bristol pilot and landlord of the Pulteney Arms in Bath, following the tragic loss of life from the Clovelly fishing fleet in a severe storm in November 1838. Aided by Sir Jahleel Brenton, at that time governor of Greenwich Hospital, Mr. Rye succeeded in establishing the Society, and of collecting a respectable sum as a first subscription, initially by going from house to house in Bath collecting half crowns. The portrait (below) of Mr. Rye and Mr. Gee Jones was painted to commemorate the founding of the Society, which now hangs in the boardroom of the Society's Headquarters in Chichester.

The society's first President was Admiral Sir George Cockburn, 10th Baronet, who in the War of 1812 cruised Chesapeake Bay and captured and burnt Washington on 24 August 1814. The Society's first patron was Queen Victoria and it has had a royal patron ever since; today it is the Princess Royal. One of its first Vice-Presidents was Sir Robert Peel, 2nd Bt. The Society was incorporated by an Act of Parliament in 1850.

The society's flag, a Saint George's Cross with the letters SFMS in the quadrants and a number, was displayed by ships and their position reported by the coastguard to the Shipping and Mercantile Gazette in London. From 1851 until 1854 it operated lifeboats at Lytham, Rhyl, Portmadoc, Tenby, Llanelly, Teignmouth, Hornsea and Newhaven but it was subsequently agreed that it would be wiser if one organisation concentrated on rescuing lives at sea while the other helped the survivors or their bereaved families ashore, so in 1854 the Society transferred its lifeboats to the RNLI.

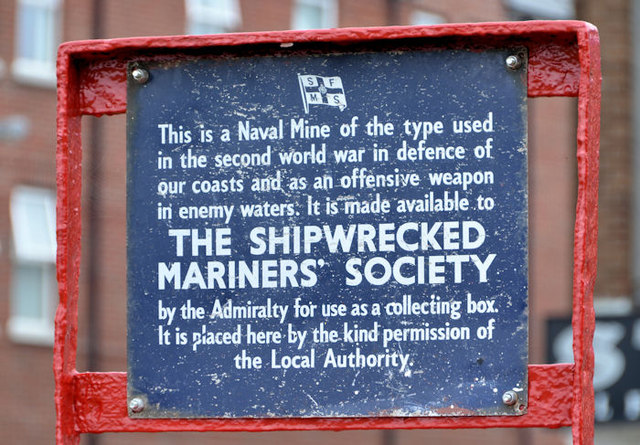
After the Second World War, the Admiralty gave decommissioned naval mines to the Society to use as donation boxes.

In 2017, Admiral George Zambellas, former First Sea Lord and Chief of the Naval Staff took over as President of the society.

In 2021, the Annual General Meeting of the society was held at the Fishmongers' Hall in London and the patron of the society, Anne, Princess Royal presented awards of the society.

== Awards ==
The society issues lifesaving trophies to those who perform notable acts of rescue at sea, for example, in 2023, a marine engineer was honoured with a lifesaving trophy after he facilitated the rescue of several shipwreck survivors.

Other awards issued by the society include the Lord Lewin Award, the Lady Swaythling Trophy and the Emile Robin Award.

== Photography ==
The Society hold an annual photography competition, to raise awareness of its charity work. Submitters are asked for pictures that capture the UK’s connection with the sea, including subjects as merchant ships, fishing vessels, the coastline, harbours and ports.

In 2023, the Society announced the 11th annual winner of its photography prize.

== See also ==
- George Cockburn

== Bibliography ==
- The Shipwrecked Fishermen & Mariners' Royal Benevolent Society, Brief History of the First Hundred Years published in 1939.
