= Grade II* listed buildings in Pembrokeshire =

Pembrokeshire shown within Wales

This is a list of the 187 (as of September 2024) Grade II*-listed buildings in the county of Pembrokeshire, Wales.

In the United Kingdom, the term listed building refers to a building or other structure officially designated as being of special architectural, historical, or cultural significance; Grade II* structures are those considered to be "particularly important buildings of more than special interest". Listing was begun by a provision in the Town and Country Planning Act 1947. Once listed, strict limitations are imposed on the modifications allowed to a building's structure or fittings. In Wales, the authority for listing under the Planning (Listed Buildings and Conservation Areas) Act 1990 rests with Cadw.

== Buildings ==
Name	Location Grid Ref. (Note: Sometimes known as OSGB36, the grid reference is based on the British national grid reference system used by the Ordnance Survey.) Geo-coordinates	Date Listed	Function	Notes	Reference Number	Image
Dovecote	Angle; SM8660603075; 51°41′09″N 5°05′19″W	14 May 1970	Dovecote	In field immediately N of Castle Farm.	5922	See more images
St. Michael and All Angel's Church	Bosherston, Stackpole; SR9661194826; 51°36′55″N 4°56′21″W	14 May 1970	Church	At the north end of Bosherston village.	5927	See more images
Church of Saint David	Caldey Island, Tenby; SS1428296641; 51°38′16″N 4°41′07″W	14 May 1970	Church	Situated some 50m W of Caldey Abbey chapel.	5933	See more images
Carew Bridge	Carew; SN0476103827; 51°41′57″N 4°49′36″W	14 May 1970	Bridge	About 500 m E of Carew Castle carrying the Carew to Cresselly A4075 road across the estuary of the Carew River.	5939	See more images
The Fortified Rectory	Carew; SN0445202733; 51°41′21″N 4°49′50″W	14 May 1972	Rectory	100 m SW of St Mary's churchyard.	5947	Upload Photo
The Old Vicarage (remains)	Castlemartin; SR9109998888; 51°38′59″N 5°01′16″W	14 May 1970	Vicarage (ruin)	Within St Michael's churchyard, about 40 m E of the church.	5949	Upload Photo
Church of St Lawrence	Gumfreston, St Florence; SN1092501102; 51°40′36″N 4°44′10″W	5 April 1970	Church	150 m S of the B4318 in Gumfreston.	5958	See more images
Hodgeston Parish Church	Hodgeston, Lamphey; SS0294699378; 51°39′31″N 4°51′01″W	14 May 1970	Church	In village of Hodgeston, E of Lamphey	5959	See more images
Lamphey Court	Lamphey; SN0171201104; 51°40′25″N 4°52′09″W	14 May 1970	Hotel	To the N of Lamphey Village.	5968	See more images
Church of St Caradoc	Lawrenny, Martletwy; SN0164806892; 51°43′32″N 4°52′24″W	14 May 1970	Church	At the W of Lawrenny village, at the entrance to the grounds of the former Lawrenny Castle.	5971	See more images
Dovecote	Manorbier; SS0626797855; 51°38′46″N 4°48′06″W	14 May 1970	Dovecote		5977	See more images
Sunny Hill Farmhouse	Manorbier; SS0622499974; 51°39′54″N 4°48′12″W	14 May 1970	Farmhouse	300 m S of the Ridgeway, 500 m W of turning to St Florence.	5984	Upload Photo
Norchard	Manorbier; SS0818599465; 51°39′40″N 4°46′29″W	14 May 1970	House	800 m S of the Ridgeway and 1 km E of Manobier Station.	5986	Upload Photo
Church of St Nicholas	Penally; SS1177299177; 51°39′35″N 4°43′22″W	14 May 1970	Church	In the centre of the village of Penally. The churchyard is enclosed within a rubble masonry wall with simple iron gates.	5992	See more images
Carswell Medieval House	Penally; SN0980201058; 51°40′34″N 4°45′08″W	14 May 1970	House (ruin)	50 m N of Carswell Farm House, in the farmyard. It is the western of the two ruined buildings.	6005	See more images
Church of St Florence	St Florence; SN0823101159; 51°40′35″N 4°46′30″W	14 May 1970	Church	Centrally placed in a compact village.	6008	See more images
St. Twynnell's Church	Stackpole; SR9495497592; 51°38′23″N 4°57′53″W	14 May 1970	Church	Mediaeval church restored by Lord Cawdor in 1858.	6018	See more images
Park House	Stackpole; SR9810296166; 51°37′41″N 4°55′06″W	14 May 1970	House	House of c.1700 with mid-18th century alterations.	6021	Upload Photo
St. Mary's Church	Castlemartin; SR9323197505; 51°38′18″N 4°59′22″W	14 May 1970	Church	2 km E of Castlemartin.	6035	See more images
Carew Tidal Mill and Tidal Barrier	Carew; SN0415503831; 51°41′56″N 4°50′07″W	29 September 1971	Mill/Tidal barrier	The Tidal Barrier lies across the estuary of the Carew River about 300 m W of Carew Castle. The tidal mill stands on it near to the left (S) bank, over the deeper water where the natural river channel lies.	6038	See more images
St Elidyr's Church	Amroth; SN1631507898; 51°44′23″N 4°39′42″W	21 June 1971	Church	1 km N of Amroth Village, in an isolated group with Amroth Farm and the old village school. The group is called 'Castle Back'. The church is in a roundish graveyard surrounded by walls and hedges.	6044	See more images
Church of St. Mary	Kilgetty-Begelly; SN1181507311; 51°43′58″N 4°43′36″W	21 June 1971	Church	In village of Begelly, 0.5 km N of the A477(T). The church is in a large churchyard with low stone wall, stile and lychgate to N.	6045	See more images
Church of Saint Mary	Bletherston, New Moat; SN0703421206; 51°51′21″N 4°48′12″W	21 June 1971	Church	In a prominent position in the centre of Bletherston village.	6046	See more images
Church of St. Elidyr	Lampeter Velfrey; SN1411910913; 51°45′57″N 4°41′43″W	21 June 1971	Church	4 km S of village of Lampeter Velfrey, about 400 m N of Ludchurch village, in a square churchyard partly walled.	6050	See more images
Church of St Jeffrey and St Oswald	Jeffreyston; SN0894806525; 51°43′29″N 4°46′03″W	21 June 1971	Church	In the centre of the village of Jeffreyston. The churchyard is circular with late C19 extensions N and E. There is a preaching cross (separately listed) to the S side and a small free-standing mortuary chapel to the N side.	6052	See more images
Church of St Aidan	Llawhaden; SN0752017468; 51°49′21″N 4°47′40″W	21 June 1971	Church	In a square churchyard on the right bank of the Eastern Cleddau, 300 m N of Llawhaden Bridge.	6062	See more images
Llawhaden Bridge and River Bank Wall	Llawhaden; SN0747317251; 51°49′14″N 4°47′42″W	21 June 1971	Bridge	On Eastern Cleddau ? km E of Llawhaden Village	6064	See more images
Vaynor	Llawhaden; SN0980517513; 51°49′26″N 4°45′40″W	21 June 1971	House	Reached by a private drive on the E side of the B4313 Pont Sh?n to Bethesda road	6072	Upload Photo
Church of St Leonard	Loveston, Jeffreyston; SN0841108477; 51°44′32″N 4°46′35″W	21 June 1971	Church	Loveston	6076	See more images
Parish Church of Saint Nicholas	New Moat; SN0624325241; 51°53′31″N 4°49′02″W	21 June 1971	Church	Prominently situated on S side of village on W side of road; raised rounded graveyard.	6086	See more images
Blackpool Bridge	Martletwy; SN0601214514; 51°47′44″N 4°48′52″W	21 June 1971	Bridge	Crossing the Eastern Cleddau adjacent to Blackpool Mill, closest to the highest navigable point of the river. Also in Slebech	6089	See more images
Blackpool Mill	Martletwy; SN0599914489; 51°47′43″N 4°48′53″W	21 June 1971	Mill	On the left bank of the Eastern Cleddau 1 km SW of Canaston Bridge.	6090	See more images
St Issell's Church	Saundersfoot; SN1325305818; 51°43′12″N 4°42′18″W	21 June 1971		1km N of the village of Saundersfoot. The church stands in a large undulating graveyard through which a stream passes.	6093	See more images
Slebech Park	Slebech; SN0314113977; 51°47′23″N 4°51′21″W	21 June 1971	Country house	In extensive grounds 2 km E of Picton Castle, overlooking the Eastern Cleddau.	6102	Slebech Park
Tenby Castle remains	Tenby; SN1371400501; 51°40′20″N 4°41′44″W	19 March 1951	Castle ruin	Remains are situated at various locations on Castle Hill, on the NE side of the town.	6111	See more images
Laston House	Tenby; SN1365600550; 51°40′22″N 4°41′47″W	19 March 1951	House	Situated on the N side of Castle Square facing S to St Julian's Street.	6119	See more images
The Prize House	Tenby; SN1331900585; 51°40′23″N 4°42′04″W	31 May 1954	House	Facing the sea next to the Royal Lion Hotel just S of the junction of the High Street and White Lion Street.	6165	The Prize House
Medieval structure in the churchyard	Tenby; SN1338900457; 51°40′18″N 4°42′00″W	19 March 1951		Situated some 20m W of the Church of Saint Mary in Liberty.	6175	Medieval structure in the churchyard
Norton House, including garden wall to street	Tenby; SN1315900880; 51°40′32″N 4°42′13″W	19 March 1951	House	Situated on the W side of The Norton some 110m N of the junction with St John's Hill.	6211	Norton House, including garden wall to street
The Former Assembly Rooms	Tenby; SN1364200561; 51°40′22″N 4°41′48″W	19 March 1951		Situated in a prominent position between the harbour and the sea at the N end of Pier Hill.	6223	The Former Assembly Rooms
Plantagenet House	Tenby; SN1352500433; 51°40′18″N 4°41′53″W	19 March 1951		Situated on the W side of Quay Hill between Tudor Square and Bridge Street.	6227	Plantagenet House
Saint Catherine's Fort	Tenby; SN1395200307; 51°40′14″N 4°41′31″W	19 March 1951		Situated in a prominent position on Saint Catherine's Island to the E of the town and SE of Castle Hill.	6229	See more images
No 3 Rock Terrace including railings	Tenby; SN1360100345; 51°40′15″N 4°41′49″W	19 March 1951	Houses	Set back from the street line on the S side of St Julian's Street opposite Slate House with rear facade overlooking Iron Bar Sands.	6261	No 3 Rock Terrace including railings
No 1 Lexden Terrace, including area railings	Tenby; SN1365100382; 51°40′16″N 4°41′47″W	19 March 1951	Houses	Lexden Terrace lies at a tangent to the E side of St Julian's Street, the rear overlooking Castle Sands, all set back behind a forecourt wall.	6268	No 1 Lexden Terrace, including area railings
Dovecote in field to NW of Priory Farmhouse	Pembroke; SM9765201754; 51°40′41″N 4°55′41″W	14 July 1981	Dovecote	Situated near the centre of a field some 350m NW of Priory Farmhouse.	6327	Upload Photo
Priory Farmhouse	Pembroke; SM9787801478; 51°40′32″N 4°55′29″W	10 February 1951		Situated in Monkton approximately 50m W of the Priory Church of Saint Nicholas.	6328	Upload Photo
Pembroke town walls	Pembroke; SM9876601234; 51°40′25″N 4°54′42″W	9 June 1976	Wall	On the S side of the town extending some 225m E from no. 5 Common Road to Rock Terrace.	6342	See more images
Outbuilding range at Kingston Farm to SE of old farmhouse	Pembroke; SR9945799468; 51°39′29″N 4°54′03″W	14 July 1981		Situated SE of the house at Kingston Farm some 2km SE of the centre of Pembroke.	6363	Upload Photo
Nos 89/91 Main Street	Pembroke; SM9867501353; 51°40′29″N 4°54′47″W	10 February 1951		On the S side of Main Street some 35m E of its W junction with East Back.	6385	Upload Photo
111 Main Street	Pembroke; SM9881701310; 51°40′28″N 4°54′40″W	14 July 1981	House	On the S side of Main Street near its E junction with East Back and opposite the entrance to the Church of Saint Michael.	6395	Upload Photo
Zion Free Church, Meyrick Street	Pembroke Dock; SM9667403435; 51°41′34″N 4°56′36″W	14 July 1981	Church	Built 1846-8, extended 1866-7 and renovated 1882, 1911 and 1986. Formerly listed as Wesleyan Methodist Chapel	6415	See more images
Former Guard House, the Dockyard	Pembroke Dock; SM9603603636; 51°41′39″N 4°57′09″W	18 January 1974			6436	Former Guard House, the Dockyard
The Old Storehouse, the Dockyard	Pembroke Dock; SM9602503742; 51°41′43″N 4°57′10″W	18 January 1974		Situated to W of Sunderland House, behind ferry terminal. formerly listed as Main Stores of R Hayes Investments Ltd	6441	The Old Storehouse, the Dockyard
The Defensible Barracks Presely View (W End)	Pembroke Dock; SM9606703083; 51°41′22″N 4°57′07″W	18 January 1974	Barracks		6448	See more images
No 1, The Terrace	Pembroke Dock; SM9603803521; 51°41′36″N 4°57′09″W	18 January 1974	House	formerly listed together with the Commodore Club	6454	Upload Photo
No 2, The Terrace, The Dockyard	Pembroke Dock; SM9606303504; 51°41′35″N 4°57′08″W	18 January 1974	House		6455	Upload Photo
Garrison Chapel	Pembroke Dock; SM9628003484; 51°41′35″N 4°56′56″W	18 January 1974	Museum		6458	See more images
Flemish Cottage	Pembroke; SM9818701527; 51°40′34″N 4°55′13″W	14 July 1981		On the S side of the road opposite Pembroke Castle and some 65m E of Monkton Bridge.	6468	Upload Photo
Panteg farmhouse	Llanddewi Velfrey; SN1570916121; 51°48′48″N 4°40′30″W	2 April 1986	Farmhouse	On an elevated site to SE of village, overlooking Lampeter Vale. Reached by a long curving track along wooded hillside.	6547	Upload Photo
Orielton Field Centre	Orielton, Hundleton; SR9545399036; 51°39′10″N 4°57′30″W	14 May 1970	Field Centre	Clay Lane, Orielton	6573	See more images
Former Banqueting Tower	Orielton, Hundleton; SR9543598750; 51°39′01″N 4°57′30″W	14 May 1970	Tower	about 300m SE OF Orielton Field Centre	6586	See more images
Former Church of Saint Mary, Pwllcrochan	Pwllcrochan, Hundleton; SM9205102657; 51°41′02″N 5°00′35″W	14 May 1970			6587	See more images
Dovecote and attached Courtyard Ranges of Outbuildings	West Orielton, Hundleton; SR9529698961; 51°39′07″N 4°57′38″W	29 September 1993	Dovecote	Farm Buildings E of West Orielton	6600	Upload Photo
Llechryd Bridge	Manordeifi; SN2179743627; 52°03′44″N 4°36′03″W	21 September 1964	Bridge	Situated across Afon Teifi between Llechryd and Castell Malgwyn lodge.	9895	See more images
Albro Castle	St Dogmaels; 52°05′20″N 4°41′13″W	14 April 1992	Workhouse	aka Cardigan Workhouse	10556	See more images
Church of St Llawddog	Cilgerran; SN1906543074; 52°03′23″N 4°38′26″W	16 January 1952	Church	Church Street (S side)	11972	See more images
Glandovan	Cilgerran; SN1992441504; 52°02′33″N 4°37′38″W	16 January 1952	House	16th century house.	11973	Upload Photo
Benton Castle	Burton; SN0053806887; 51°43′30″N 4°53′22″W	13 December 1951	Castle	Built on a spectacular position high above the W side of the Daugleddau some 2.3km NE of the church at Burton.	11981	See more images
Rosemarket dovecote	Rosemarket; SM9539008241; 51°44′07″N 4°57′53″W	13 December 1951	Dovecote	In the centre of a field known as Pigeon Hay some 100m NE of the crossroads near the Church of Saint Ismael.	11983	Upload Photo
Scolton Manor	Scolton, Spittal; SM9900022038; 51°51′38″N 4°55′14″W	13 December 1951	Museum	Situated in own grounds on W side of B4329 some 1.5 km SE of Spittal village.	11984	See more images
Church of Saint Mary	Burton; SM9854105649; 51°42′48″N 4°55′03″W	3 January 1963	Church	On the N side of Burton at the end of Church Road.	11987	See more images
Church of St Ishmael	Camrose; SM9271220066; 51°50′26″N 5°00′38″W	3 January 1963	Church	Situated in churchyard in centre of Camrose village.	11988	See more images
Camrose House	Camrose; SM9269719787; 51°50′17″N 5°00′38″W	3 January 1963	House	Situated on the S side of the village, the drive to Camrose House and Home Farm off a minor road just S of the bridge over Camrose Brook.	11989	Upload Photo
Clareston	Freystrop; SM9572010472; 51°45′20″N 4°57′40″W	3 January 1963	House	At the end of a drive running SW off the road through Freystrop just S of Puddleduck Bridge.	11991	Upload Photo
Church of St Peter	Johnston; SM9321210406; 51°45′15″N 4°59′51″W	3 January 1963	Church	In centre of village, in churchyard to E of main road.	11996	See more images
Nolton Rectory	Nolton and Roch; SM8667718128; 51°49′15″N 5°05′48″W	3 January 1963	Rectory	Situated opposite Nolton church in Nolton village.	12000	Upload Photo
Cottesmore including attached E conservatory and NW wing.	Rudbaxton; SM9484218604; 51°49′42″N 4°58′43″W	3 January 1963	House	Reached by a drive of some 650m W off the A40 at Tangiers.	12002	Upload Photo
Church of Saint Andrew	Walwyn's Castle; SM8847909593; 51°44′42″N 5°03′55″W	3 January 1963	Church	On the S side of the minor road through Robeston West.	12005	See more images
Poyston including attached service ranges to NW.	Rudbaxton; SM9675119815; 51°50′23″N 4°57′06″W	3 January 1963	House	Situated some 1.3 km E of the A40 and just N of the airfield at Withybush.	12010	Upload Photo
Church of St Dogfael	St Dogswells, Wolfscastle; SM9689228005; 51°54′48″N 4°57′16″W	3 January 1963	Church	Situated S of the Afon Anghof some 150m E of Sealyham Bridge and some 400m N of St Dogwells Farm.	12011	See more images
Church of St Mary	Wiston; SN0221817959; 51°49′30″N 4°52′17″W	3 January 1963	Church	In a prominent position on the S side of the road through Wiston and some 200m S of Wiston Castle.	12017	See more images
New Bridge and four lamp standards	Haverfordwest; SM9551915689; 51°48′08″N 4°58′02″W	7 January 1974	Bridge	Situated between Picton Place and Victoria Place, across the Western Cleddau river.	12020	See more images
The Old Bridge	Haverfordwest; SM9540415876; 51°48′14″N 4°58′08″W	10 December 1951	Bridge	Situated across river between N end of Bridge Street and Old Bridge.	12021	See more images
Church of Saint Martin of Tours	Haverfordwest; SM9516915733; 51°48′09″N 4°58′20″W	10 December 1951	Church	Situated in churchyard raised above Church Street and Chapel Lane.	12041	See more images
Tabernacle Congregational Church	Haverfordwest; SM9509715744; 51°48′10″N 4°58′24″W	7 January 1974	Church	Situated on SW corner of City Road/Barn St, facing across main road to St Martin's Church.	12044	See more images
Tabernacle Church School	Haverfordwest; SM9510715761; 51°48′10″N 4°58′23″W	7 January 1974	School	Situated adjoining Tabernacle Church to N, overlooking junction of City Road and Perrots Road.	12045	Tabernacle Church School
Forecourt dwarf wall and railings to Tabernacle Church and to Tabernacle Church School	Haverfordwest; SM9511815744; 51°48′10″N 4°58′23″W	7 January 1974		Situated across the E fronts of the chapel and school, overlooking junction with Perrots Road.	12046	Forecourt dwarf wall and railings to Tabernacle Church and to Tabernacle Church School
Williamston House including area railings	Haverfordwest; SM9531215463; 51°48′01″N 4°58′12″W	7 January 1974	House	On the S side of Goat Street some 45m E of its junction with Market Street.	12081	Upload Photo
8 Goat Street	Haverfordwest; SM9530115483; 51°48′01″N 4°58′13″W	10 December 1951	House	Large 18th-century terraced house, attached to the similar Grade II* listed No. 10	12090	Upload Photo
Foley House	Haverfordwest; SM9533215505; 51°48′02″N 4°58′11″W	10 December 1951	House	Situated in own grounds on sloping site half way down street, set back in terraced forecourt.	12092	Foley House
Hermon's Hill House	Haverfordwest; SM9541715492; 51°48′02″N 4°58′07″W	10 December 1951		Situated at top end of Hill Lane to S of No 27 Hill Lane.	12097	Upload Photo
15 High Street	Haverfordwest; SM9527315580; 51°48′05″N 4°58′14″W	10 December 1951	Shop	On the S side of the High Street opposite its junction with Dark Street.	12104	Upload Photo
The Shire Hall	Haverfordwest; SM9541415609; 51°48′06″N 4°58′07″W	10 December 1951	Restaurant	On the S side of the High Street some 25m W of its junction with Quay Street.	12110	See more images
Railings, gates, steps and retaining wall to the Shire Hall	Haverfordwest; SM9541115623; 51°48′06″N 4°58′07″W	7 January 1974	Railings/gates/steps	On the S side of the High Street some 25m W of its junction with Quay Street.	12111	Railings, gates, steps and retaining wall to the Shire Hall
12 High Street	Haverfordwest; SM9526215611; 51°48′05″N 4°58′15″W	7 January 1974	Office	Situated attached to No 1 Dark Street, at junction of High Street and Dark Street.	12116	12 High Street
22 High Street	Haverfordwest; SM9530615609; 51°48′05″N 4°58′13″W	7 January 1974	House	Situated two doors down from set-back for C20 National Westminster Bank.	12118	Upload Photo
36 and 38 High Street	Haverfordwest; SM9536515628; 51°48′06″N 4°58′10″W	12 October 1951	Shops	On the N side of the High Street some 60m W of its junction with Quay Street.	12122	Upload Photo
40 High Street	Haverfordwest; SM9537415632; 51°48′06″N 4°58′09″W	12 October 1951	Offices	On the N side of the High Street some 50m W of its junction with Quay Street.	12123	Upload Photo
29 Hill Street	Haverfordwest; SM952153; 51°47′58″N 4°58′18″W	12 October 1951	House	Situated in terraced row against right end of C20 College Court development.	12137	Upload Photo
Palace Cinema and 2 Hill Street	Haverfordwest; SM9525515424; 51°47′59″N 4°58′15″W	7 January 1974	Cinema and house	Situated on corner of Upper Market Street with facades to both streets.	12148	Palace Cinema and 2 Hill Street
Hillborough House and area railings	Haverfordwest; SM9518015411; 51°47′59″N 4°58′19″W	7 January 1974		Some 30m S of the junction of Hill Street and Horn's Lane.	12152	Upload Photo
The Crypt	Haverfordwest; SM9522615560; 51°48′04″N 4°58′17″W	10 December 1951	Crypt	Situated on the corner of Market Street and High St, opposite St Mary's Church.	12172	The Crypt
Plas Glyn-y-Mel, including quadrant wall & gatepier to W service court	Fishguard, Fishguard and Goodwick; SM9661236965; 51°59′38″N 4°57′50″W	24 November 1978	House	Situated in its own grounds at the end of Glyn-y-Mel Road.	12256	Plas Glyn-y-Mel, including quadrant wall & gatepier to W service court
Hermon Baptist Church including forecourt walls and steps	Fishguard, Fishguard and Goodwick; SM9567436903; 51°59′34″N 4°58′39″W	24 November 1978	Chapel	Situated set back from the street line W of No 21, in raised paved forecourt.	12273	See more images
Church of St Hywel, Llanhowell	Llanrhian; SM8189427427; 51°54′09″N 5°10′19″W	2 April 1991	Church		12423	See more images
Church of St Mary	Newport; SN0579738964; 52°00′54″N 4°49′53″W	16 January 1952	Church	Church Street (east side)	12483	See more images
Ebenezer Congregational Chapel (Capel Ebenezer)	Newport; SN0580939176; 52°01′01″N 4°49′53″W	14 April 1992	Chapel	Lower St Mary's Street	12497	See more images
The Close Wall	St Davids and the Cathedral Close; SM7510625315; 51°52′51″N 5°16′08″W	3 January 1963	Wall	Encircling the Cathedral Close, formerly listed with Porth-y-Tŵr.	12542	The Close Wall
Pont Cerwyn Dewi / Merryvale Bridge and attached tower	St Davids and the Cathedral Close; SM7495325356; 51°52′52″N 5°16′16″W	3 January 1963	Bridge	the Cathedral Close	12543	Pont Cerwyn Dewi / Merryvale Bridge and attached tower
The City Cross	St Davids; SM7534025320; 51°52′52″N 5°15′56″W	3 January 1963	Cross	Cross Square (in centre)	12575	See more images
Capel Caerfarchell and outbuilding to north-eastern corner of forecourt, Caerfarchell	Caerfarchell; SM7946527001; 51°53′52″N 5°12′25″W	28 July 1992	Chapel		12664	See more images
Rhosson Uchaf / Rhosson Farmhouse, Rhosson	St Davids; SM7292525267; 51°52′46″N 5°18′02″W	13 December 1951	Farmhouse		12708	Upload Photo
St Non's Well, St Non's	St Davids; SM7510424369; 51°52′21″N 5°16′06″W	3 January 1963	Well	A pilgrimage site since medieval times.	12712	See more images
Treleddyn Uchaf / Upper Treleddyn, including gardens walls with crosshead	Treleddyn, St Davids; SM7319525948; 51°53′09″N 5°17′50″W	13 December 1951			12737	Upload Photo
Church of St Brynarch	Nevern; SN0833240029; 52°01′32″N 4°47′42″W	16 January 1952	Church	B4582 (N side)	12746	See more images
Churchyard of church of St Brynarch, including wall and gates	Nevern; SN0833440017; 52°01′31″N 4°47′42″W	16 January 1952	Churchyard	B4582 (N. side)	12747	Churchyard of church of St Brynarch, including wall and gates
Church of St Andrew	Bayvil, Nevern; SN1016340620; 52°01′53″N 4°46′08″W	16 January 1952	Church	B4582 (N. side) Bayvil/Beifil	12756	See more images
Berry Hill House	Berry Hill, Nevern; SN0683340192; 52°01′35″N 4°49′01″W	27 October 1992		Berry Hill	12757	Berry Hill House
Llwyngoras, including garden walls with gate piers	Moylgrove, Nevern; SN0920639504; 52°01′16″N 4°46′56″W	27 October 1992	House	Glanrhyd Road, Llwyngoras	12772	Llwyngoras, including garden walls with gate piers
Trewern	Trewern, Nevern; SN0882638106; 52°00′30″N 4°47′13″W	4 September 1980	House		12808	Upload Photo
Church of St Katharine	Milford Haven; SM9086305754; 51°42′41″N 5°01′43″W	17 July 1951	Church	Sandhurst Road	12905	See more images
Fort Hubberston	Hakin, Milford Haven; SM8907505508; 51°42′31″N 5°03′16″W	22 February 1993	Fort	Situated on headland, approached by access drive running S from Primary School in Picton Road.	12920	See more images
The Observatory	Milford; SM8921105956; 51°42′45″N 5°03′09″W	6 March 1964	Observatory (ruined)	Picton Road, Hakin	12922	See more images
Pill Priory Ruins	Lower Priory, Milford Haven; SM9027707263; 51°43′29″N 5°02′17″W	28 January 1963	Priory (ruined)	Lower Priory	12927	See more images
The Steps, (including property formerly known as Brook Villa)	Lower Priory, Milford Haven; SM9027807244; 51°43′28″N 5°02′17″W	28 January 1963	House	Lower Priory	12928	Upload Photo
The Priory Inn (including 3 properties formerly known as Priory Farmhouse)	Milford Haven; SM9026407226; 51°43′28″N 5°02′17″W	28 January 1963	Inn	The Steps above Priory Farm	12929	The Priory Inn (including 3 properties formerly known as Priory Farmhouse)
Church of St Peter & St Cewydd	Steynton, Milford Haven; SM9177807820; 51°43′49″N 5°01′00″W	22 February 1993	Church	Situated on E side of main road in Steynton village.	12934	See more images
Church of St. Gwyndaf	Llanwnda, Pencaer; SM9321839584; 52°00′58″N 5°00′53″W	14 July 1993	Church		12980	See more images
Tregwnt, Tregwynt, Granston/Treopert	Pencaer; SM8896634617; 51°58′11″N 5°04′25″W	3 January 1963	House		12996	See more images
North Wing & Low Farm Range to W. of Tregwynt	Tregwynt, Granston/Treopert, Pencaer; SM8893734630; 51°58′12″N 5°04′27″W	3 January 1963	House		12997	Upload Photo
St Brides Castle	Marloes and St Brides; SM7961910706; 51°45′05″N 5°11′39″W	29 October 1979	Guest house	Situated in wooded parkland, overlooking and some 700m SW of St Brides Haven.	13018	See more images
The Pigeon House and Railings at Cilwendeg Farm	Capel Colman, Boncath; SN2222538823; 52°01′09″N 4°35′32″W	23 January 1976		Situated at rear NE end of farm complex, below barn.	13024	Upload Photo
The Shell House, Cilwendeg Farm	Capel Colman, Boncath; SN2219438685; 52°01′05″N 4°35′33″W	23 January 1976	Shell House	Situated in undergrowth backing onto track running SW from Cilwendeg Farm some 70m SW of Counting House.	13025	The Shell House, Cilwendeg Farm
Farm buildings W of Temple Druid	Maenclochog; SN0959827206; 51°54′39″N 4°46′10″W	28 September 1989		To the rear of Temple Druid Cottages and just W of the house at Temple Druid.	13054	Upload Photo
Court / Cwrt including screen wall and outside kitchen to service court	Cwm Gwaun; SM9892435672; 51°58′59″N 4°55′46″W	20 July 1992		Approximately 0.5 km NE of Llanychaer, situated on fine elevated site facing W towards Fishguard. Reached by a steep track from the bridge over Afon Gwaun.	13067	Upload Photo
Rickeston Hall	Rickeston, Brawdy; SM8469825387; 51°53′07″N 5°07′48″W	8 October 1993	Farmhouse	Situated immediately W of Brawdy Airfield, some 2km N of A487.	13077	Rickeston Hall
Y Felin	St Dogmaels (part); SN1652745912; 52°04′52″N 4°40′44″W	15 November 1993	Mill	Situated some 100m ENE of the abbey ruins.	13096	Y Felin
The South West Martello Tower	Pembroke Dock; SM9551803606; 51°41′38″N 4°57′36″W	18 February 1994	Martello tower	Fort Road (W End)	14353	See more images
North East Martello Tower	Pembroke Dock; SM9640603835; 51°41′46″N 4°56′51″W	18 February 1994	Martello tower	Front Street (N Side)	14354	See more images
Dry-Moat Walls, Presely View (W end)	Pembroke Dock; SM9606703083; 51°41′22″N 4°57′07″W	18 January 1974			14371	Upload Photo
Barracks Platform, Presely View (W Side)	Pembroke Dock; SM9606703083; 51°41′22″N 4°57′07″W	18 January 1994			14372	Upload Photo
Dockyard Gates, the Dockyard	Pembroke Dock; SM9602803524; 51°41′36″N 4°57′10″W	18 January 1974			14377	Dockyard Gates, the Dockyard
Piers and Lodges (formerly listed with Dockyard Wall), the Dockyard	Pembroke Dock; SM9601403529; 51°41′36″N 4°57′10″W	18 January 1974			14378	Upload Photo
The Port Hotel (formerly listed as the Commodore Club), the Dockyard	Pembroke Dock; SM9599803533; 51°41′36″N 4°57′11″W	18 January 1974			14379	Upload Photo
Long Stable Range to South, the Dockyard	Pembroke Dock; SM9599103507; 51°41′35″N 4°57′11″W	18 January 1974			14380	Upload Photo
No 3, The Terrace, The Dockyard	Pembroke Dock; SM9607403501; 51°41′35″N 4°57′07″W	18 January 1974			14381	Upload Photo
The Graving Dock including Bollards and Capstans (formerly listed with 13 Building Slips and Carr Jet	Pembroke Dock; SM9583903927; 51°41′49″N 4°57′20″W	18 January 1974	Graving Dock		14393	Upload Photo
Church of Saint David	Brawdy; SM8580424040; 51°52′25″N 5°06′47″W	3 January 1963	Church		14396	See more images
Forecourt, Railings, Piers and Gates, Meyrick Street (W side)	Pembroke Dock; SM9669403432; 51°41′34″N 4°56′35″W	14 July 1981			14420	Upload Photo
Hescwm Mill/Felin Hescwm	Dinas Cross; SM9976438467; 52°00′30″N 4°55′08″W	18 March 1994	Mill	Situated some 200m inland from Aber Bach or Hesgwm cove, approached by narrow lane from Bwlchmawr. The mill lies to the south of the group of buildings.	14535	Hescwm Mill/Felin Hescwm
Brynhenllan Chapel	Brynhenllan, Dinas Cross; SN0091139561; 52°01′07″N 4°54′10″W	17 November 1994	Chapel		14942	See more images
Manordeifi Old Church	Manordeifi; SN2283743162; 52°03′30″N 4°35′08″W	24 November 1994	Church	Situated just above Teifi flood meadows, some 1.1km ESE of Llechryd Bridge.	15115	See more images
Terrace, Walls and Balustrades S of Ffynone House	Manordeifi; SN2424138585; 52°01′04″N 4°33′46″W	24 November 1994	Terrace, Walls and Balustrade		15123	Terrace, Walls and Balustrades S of Ffynone House
Cilrhue, Boncath	Boncath; SN1979639734; 52°01′36″N 4°37′41″W	25 January 1995	House		15388	Cilrhue, Boncath
The Stable and Coach House at Cilwendeg Farm	Capel Colman, Boncath; SN2230438777; 52°01′08″N 4°35′28″W	23 January 1976	Stable	Situated to NE of farmhouse and N of mansion.	15393	Upload Photo
Four Mediaeval House at Upper Lamphey Park Farm	Lamphey; SN0252001320; 51°40′33″N 4°51′27″W	28 February 1995	Houses	About 500m S of Deerpark Lane, at NW end of the farm complex.	15663	Upload Photo
Cresselly House	Jeffreyston; SN0645606543; 51°43′27″N 4°48′13″W	21 June 1971	House	Situated in its own grounds and approached along the N drive or through the stable courtyard to S. Faces E with terrace to W.	15933	Upload Photo
Flimston Farmhouse	Castlemartin; SR9242995646; 51°37′16″N 5°00′00″W	12 August 1995	Farmhouse (ruined)	On RAC Castlemartin Range, W of road to Stack Rocks.	16590	Flimston Farmhouse
Pricaston Farmhouse	Castlemartin; SR9177496481; 51°37′42″N 5°00′36″W	12 August 1995	Farmhouse (ruined)	On RAC Castlemartin Range, entered by Linney Gate.	16604	Pricaston Farmhouse
West Set of Kilns	Penally; SN1205500124; 51°40′06″N 4°43′09″W	26 April 1996	Kilns	At the S side of the main private road entering the Kiln Park caravan site, on the E side of the A4139. They are related to the extensive Black Rock quarries at their rear.	16918	West Set of Kilns
The Almshouse	Angle; SM8655002858; 51°41′02″N 5°05′21″W	14 May 1970	Almshouse	At S of the village street, opposite the school.	17149	Upload Photo
Fort Popton	Angle; SM8944603752; 51°41′34″N 5°02′52″W	26 January 1996	Fort	On the headland at the NE corner of Angle Bay.	17168	See more images
Thorne Island Fort	Angle; SM8463903828; 51°41′30″N 5°07′03″W	26 January 1996	Fort	Off N headland of West Angle Bay.	17169	See more images
Caldey Abbey	Tenby; SS1417396605; 51°38′15″N 4°41′12″W	23 September 1996	Abbey	On hillside above the village, about 500m SE of the harbour.	17324	See more images
Brewery	Stackpole; SR9770296123; 51°37′39″N 4°55′27″W	2 August 1996	Brewery		17990	Upload Photo
Eight-Arch Bridge	Stackpole; SR9772595602; 51°37′22″N 4°55′25″W	2 August 1996	Bridge	Built in 1797.	18003	See more images
West Blockhouse Fort	Dale; SM8181903560; 51°41′18″N 5°09′29″W	12 October 1997	Fort	Situated on West Blockhouse Point, and reached by drive of some 1.5 km from Merryborough Farm, S of Dale.	19148	West Blockhouse Fort
Church of Saint Peter	Marloes, Marloes and St Brides; SM7948508235; 51°43′45″N 5°11′41″W	23 February 1998	Church	Situated at the SE end of the village of Marloes, above and to the S of the main street.	19393	See more images
Blackpool Bridge	Slebech; SN0600614519; 51°47′44″N 4°48′53″W	26 February 1998	Bridge	Across the Eastern Cleddau adjacent to Blackpool Mill, at the highest navigable point of the river. The bridge is half in Martletwy Community and half in Slebech Community.	19408	See more images
Sandy Haven House	St Ishmaels; SM8508707614; 51°43′33″N 5°06′48″W	25 August 1998	House	Situated just S of Sandy Haven Farm some 450m NW of Sandy Haven.	20351	Upload Photo
Church of St Justinian	Trecwn; SM9532833898; 51°57′57″N 4°58′51″W	11 October 1998	Church	About 1km E of Scleddau, beyond farmhouse at end of track beginning on E side of A40, near old quarry, then across field to churchyard.	20818	Upload Photo
Bethesda Baptist Church including vestry block attached to left	Haverfordwest; SM9511815675; 51°48′07″N 4°58′23″W	14 May 1975	Church	Situated near the centre of Haverfordwest, on the E side of Barn Street near its junction with City Road and Perrots Road.	22762	See more images
Lofted outbuilding, wings and gin-house at Camrose Home Farm	Camrose; SM9318919471; 51°50′07″N 5°00′11″W	30 April 2001	Farm building	Situated on the N side of the farm court at Camrose Home Farm.	25159	Upload Photo
No 2 Lexden Terrace	Tenby; SN1365200389; 51°40′17″N 4°41′47″W	19 March 1951	House	Lexden Terrace lies at a tangent to the E side of St Julian's Street, the rear overlooking Castle Sands, all set back behind a forecourt wall.	26319	No 2 Lexden Terrace
No 3 Lexden Terrace	Tenby; SN1365400395; 51°40′17″N 4°41′47″W	19 March 1951		Lexden Terrace lies at a tangent to the E side of St Julian's Street, the rear overlooking Castle Sands, all set back behind a forecourt wall.	26320	No 3 Lexden Terrace
No 4 Lexden Terrace	Tenby; SN1365600400; 51°40′17″N 4°41′47″W	19 March 1951		Lexden Terrace lies at a tangent to the E side of St Julian's Street, the rear overlooking Castle Sands, all set back behind a forecourt wall.	26321	No 4 Lexden Terrace
No 5 Lexden Terrace	Tenby; SN1365900406; 51°40′17″N 4°41′46″W	19 March 1951		Lexden Terrace lies at a tangent to the E side of St Julian's Street, the rear overlooking Castle Sands, all set back behind a forecourt wall.	26322	No 5 Lexden Terrace
No 4 Rock Terrace	Tenby; SN1361000348; 51°40′15″N 4°41′49″W	19 March 1951	House	Set back from the street line on the S side of St Julian's Street with rear facade overlooking Iron Bar Sands.	26340	No 4 Rock Terrace
No 6 Lexden Terrace (Lexden House)	Tenby; SN1366100413; 51°40′17″N 4°41′46″W	19 March 1951		Lexden Terrace lies at a tangent to the E side of St Julian's Street, No 6, the farthest, is set back in a separate forecourt.	26349	No 6 Lexden Terrace (Lexden House)
Former Tenby Market Cross and well-chamber	Tenby; SN1310401035; 51°40′37″N 4°42′16″W	28 March 2002	Market cross	Situated at the N end of the water garden in the centre of Merlins Gardens.	26423	Former Tenby Market Cross and well-chamber
Stack Rock Fort	Herbrandston; SM8643504946; 51°42′09″N 5°05′32″W	3 April 2004	Fort	On Stack Rock island in Milford Haven some 2.7km S of Herbranston village.	82592	See more images
The defensible barracks at South Hook Fort	Herbrandston; SM8704405557; 51°42′29″N 5°05′01″W	3 April 2004	Barracks	In a prominent position some 200m N of the cliffs at South Hook Point.	82593	Upload Photo
Higgon's Well	Uzmaston and Boulston; SM9614815055; 51°47′49″N 4°57′28″W	16 July 2004	Well	On the E side of the estuary of the Cleddau Wen some 700m S of Haverfordwest station.	82964	Upload Photo
Lancych	Clydau; SN2599838382; 52°00′59″N 4°32′13″W	26 July 2004	House	Set in its own extensive grounds on the S side of the Afon Cych some 200m W of Pont Glan Cych.	82984	Upload Photo
10 Goat Street	Haverfordwest; SM9530915486; 51°48′02″N 4°58′12″W	7 January 1974	House	Large 18th-century terraced house, attached to the similar Grade II* listed No. 8	87060	Upload Photo
Gateway and walls to 'The Abbey'	Marloes and St Brides; SM8035310787; 51°45′09″N 5°11′01″W	23 February 1998	Gateway	Situated at St Brides Green, some 200m SW of St Brides Cross and some 200m SE of the coast at St Brides Haven.	87482	Upload Photo
Church of St Rhian	Llanrhian; SM8192831442; 51°56′19″N 5°10′26″W	1 March 1963	Church	Situated in Llanrhian village about 100m NE of crossroads.	87554	See more images

== See also ==
- Grade I listed buildings in Pembrokeshire
- Listed buildings in Wales
- Scheduled monuments in Pembrokeshire
- Registered historic parks and gardens in Pembrokeshire
