= Tenby Observer =

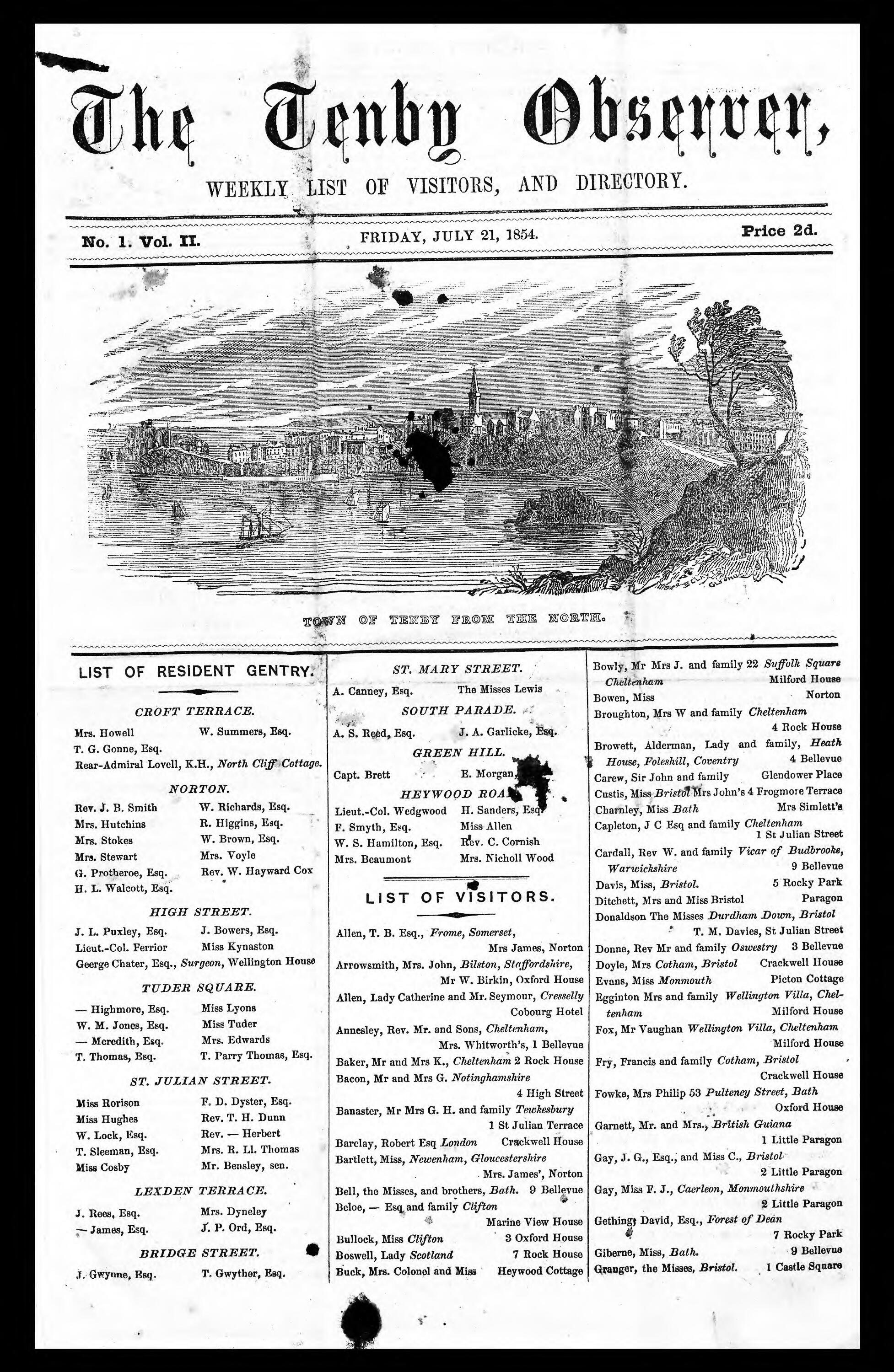
- The Tenby Observer, Weekly List of Visitors, and Directory
- Type: weekly newspaper
- Owner: Tindle
- Publisher: Richard Mason
- Launched: 13 August 1853
- Ceased publication: 30 August 1963
- City: Tenby
- Country: Wales
- Circulation: 1,505 (as of 2023)
- OCLC number: 751673320
- Website: tenby-today.co.uk

The Tenby Observer is a weekly English language newspaper, published each Friday, which circulates around Tenby, South Pembrokeshire, and amongst tourists generally. The ’paper started as a list of the town's influential and well-to-do visitors but soon added news, mostly local, and adverts which traditionally adorned the front page. It was published by Richard Mason from 1853 to 1860.

In 1907 The ‘Tenby Observer’ became a pioneer of press freedom when the then editor, Frank B. Mason (founder of the Tenby estate agents now known as fbm) protested through the law courts his being excluded from a Tenby Borough Council meeting. He lost the case, highlighting a deficiency in British law. As a result, the Admission of the Press Act was passed in 1908.

Thanks to the dedication of its staff, even in lean times, the ‘Tenby Observer’ has never missed an issue.

In 1978 the ’paper, which was being printed under the title ‘West Wales Weekly Observer’ was saved from having to close when it was acquired by Sir Ray Tindle, who encouraged a more localised approach to news reporting, “reporting on strictly local news and events which are important to the community.” To this day the ‘Tenby Observer’ is one of the titles owned by Tindle Newspapers Ltd.

The newspaper currently enjoys great success, with a print and online readership of about 24,000 per week. As well as providing an invaluable news resource to a large area of South West Wales, it is also popular with Tenby exiles and people who have made Pembrokeshire their “second home.”

Thanks to Newsplan 2000 and the Heritage Lottery Fund, the Tenby newspaper archives from 1853 to 1950 were committed to microfilm and are housed in the ‘Observer’ offices; the remaining archives are stored in their original format at Tenby Library, Greenhill Avenue, Tenby.

On 31 July 2003 Prince Charles visited Tenby and the ‘Tenby Observer’ to mark the paper's 150th Anniversary. He also visited Tenby Museum and Art Gallery to mark the 125th anniversary of the museum's opening.

Also under the ‘Tenby Observer’ banner are the ‘Narberth and Whitland Observer’, established 1906, the ‘Pembroke and Pembroke Dock Observer’, established 2011, a yearly Summer Holiday Guide, the monthly nostalgic ‘Tenby Times’ (now a supplement), ‘Tenby Times Annual’, two Wedding Planners each year, an event guide for Ironman Wales and a Local Directory featuring local businesses and skilled services.

Current ‘Observer’ offices are situated at the bottom of Warren Street, Tenby, near the Railway Station. In addition to the General Manager and Editor there are four members of staff for reception, sales and advertising, and two reporters.

The official website, www.tenby-today.co.uk is updated on a regular basis with the latest local news and sport.

In 2018 the increasingly popular ‘Tenby Observer’ Facebook Page achieved 8,000 likes.

== Associated titles ==
Tenby List of Visitors (1853); Tenby and Pembroke Dock observer (1861-1867); Tenby Observer and Pembrokeshire chronicle (1867-1883); Tenby Observer and Weekly List of Visitors (1853-1861; 1889-1924); Tenby Observer and District Reporter (1924-1949); Tenby Observer and County News; West Wales Weekly Observer (-1978); Tenby Times (1869-1876; 2001–present); Narberth & Whitland Observer (1906-present); Pembroke & Pembroke Dock Observer (2011–present).
