= Tenby Museum and Art Gallery =

Local history museum in Tenby, Wales

Coordinates: 51.6723°N 4.6949°W

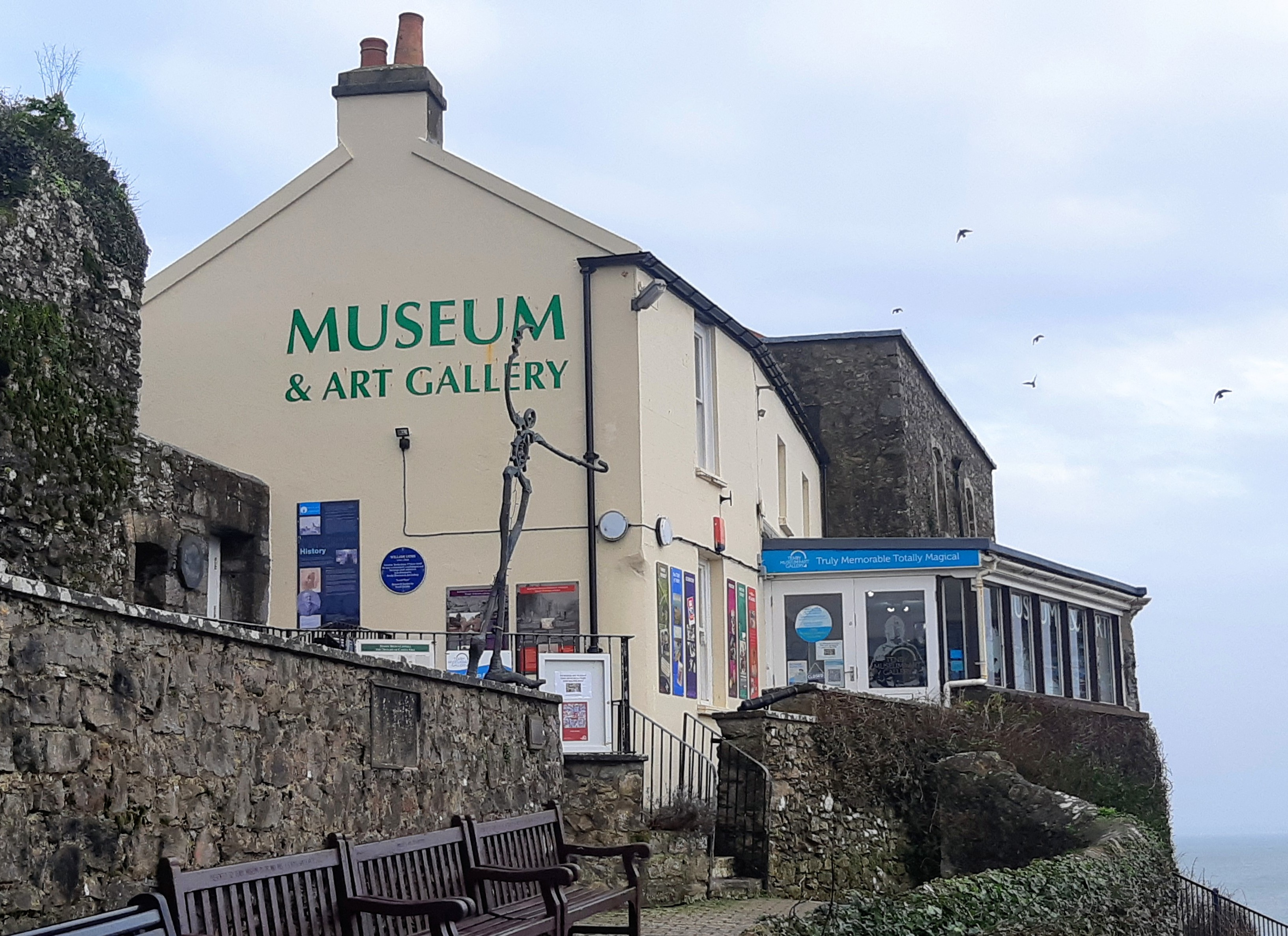
- Established: 1878
- Location: Castle Hill, Tenby, Pembrokeshire, Wales
- Website: Tenby Museum and Art Gallery

Listed Building – Grade II
- Official name: Tenby Museum
- Designated: 19 March 1951; 74 years ago
- Reference no.: 26353

Tenby Museum and Art Gallery, located in Tenby, Pembrokeshire, South West Wales, is the oldest independent museum in Wales. Established in 1878, the museum has a collection of local geology, biology, archaeological and maritime artifacts. Accompanying the regular exhibitions since 1976 is a collection of images and crafts by local and national artists such as Augustus and Gwen John. The Tenby Museum building is a Grade II listed building.

== Origins ==
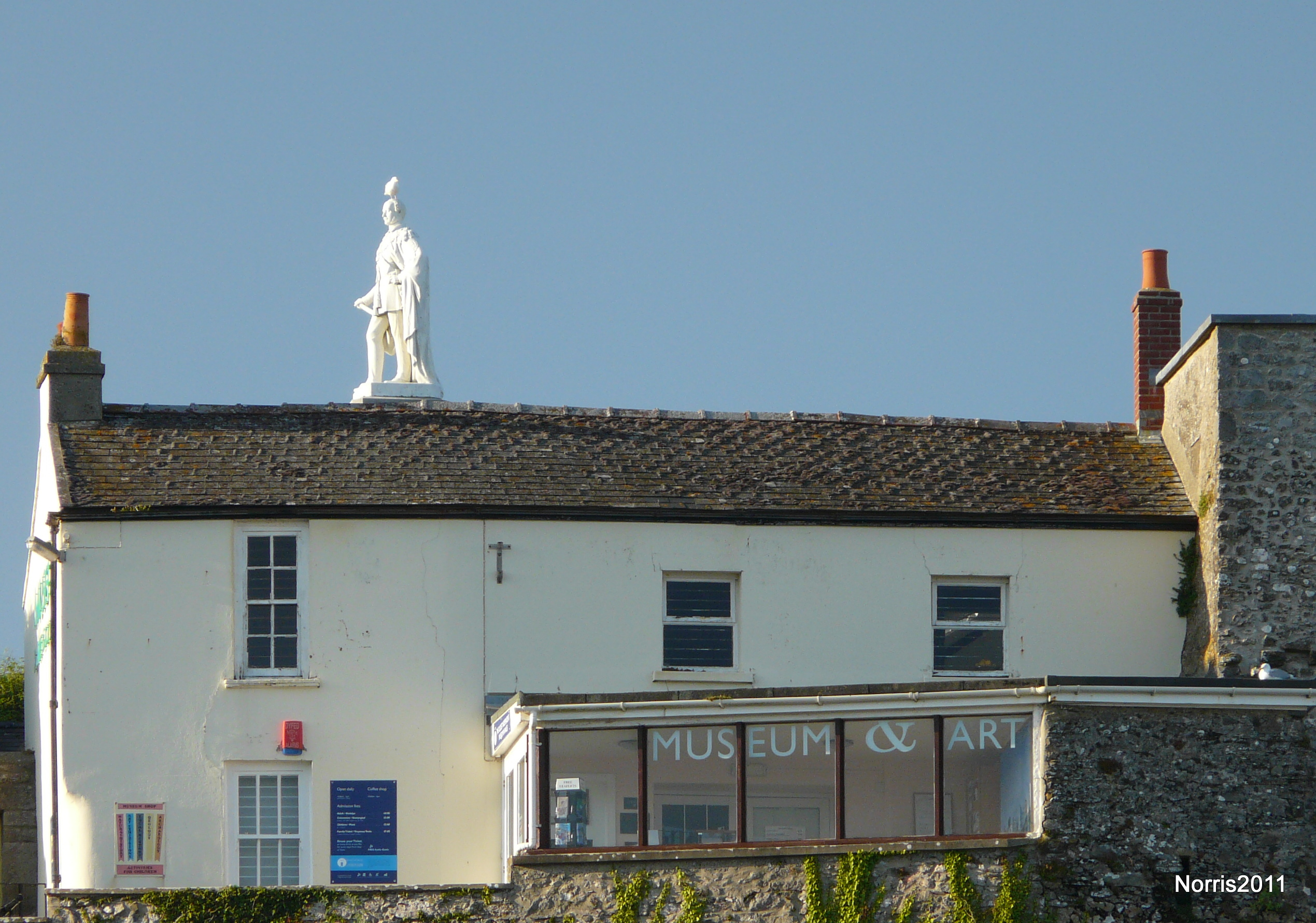
Tenby Museum and Art Gallery

At the beginning of January 1878, a meeting of a like-minded group of would-be trustees of a proposed museum was held at 10 The Norton, Tenby, the home of one of their members, Charles Allen. The group also included Edward Laws (Hons. Secretary), Dr Frederick Dyser, Rev. George Huntington, James T. Hawkesley, E. Rawdon Power, Dr. John G. Lock and Frederick Walker.

It was the wish of the group to house and display the collection of valuable geological specimens formerly belonging to the late Rev. Gilbert N. Smith, an amateur archaeologist and geologist, who had been the Rector of nearby Gumfreston. The collection had been purchased by the town of Tenby for £100 and was to form the basis of a museum collection together with other promised items of natural history and of scientific books.

The trustees wished for these collections to be permanently housed in the town for the benefit of the community. From the beginning, they decided upon a purely local museum with no ‘cosmopolitan’ collections being accepted. This rule has been adhered to ever since and material unconnected with the area is not collected.

The National school building on Castle Hill had recently been vacated-a new school having been built in the centre of the town. In February 1878, the Tenby Town Council, presided over by Alderman Charles Allen, passed a resolution to grant the trustees permission to rent the school building at the cost of one shilling per annum for the purpose of forming a permanent museum. The council had no wish to become involved in any other expenditure and therefore the costs of refurbishing the building and administering a museum were to be met by the trustees.

The trustees immediately set about obtaining an estimate for the necessary rebuilding work. Lewis John, a local builder, estimated a total cost of £44 12s 11d for initial repair work to the building. His estimate being accepted, John set about repairing the roof, guttering, windows, doorways, and staircases, together with plastering and some redecoration. His work was regarded as highly satisfactory and he was later employed in further work to the building. Some display cases were also purchased at the time.

It was obvious that, to provide a community museum, financial help was going to be necessary from within the community itself. Early in February, Edward Laws prepared two hundred letters which were circulated to selected residents of the town, setting out the aims of the proposed museum and outlining the finances required to achieve those aims. Soon, a number of donations were received. E. J. Reed, the Member of Parliament for the Pembroke Boroughs gave £100 and wrote to Laws: ‘I need hardly say that the establishment at Tenby of such a museum as that contemplated would be to me, as to many others, a source of great satisfaction.’ There were other similar favourable responses from the community and elsewhere to the idea of forming a museum collection. Yet, a letter to the Tenby Observer of 3 January 1878 written by one ‘SGP’ of Bristol (subsequently identified as one Samuel Purchase) indicates a note of caution was being urged with regard to the administration of the proposed museum and the safeguarding of its collection.

== History ==
17 June 1976 saw the official opening of the Wilfred Harrison Art Gallery. In 1995, the New Art Gallery was opened at Tenby Museum.

In the 20th century, the museum was affiliated to the National Museum and Galleries of Wales and received increasing recognition and support from a number of professional museum organisations.

In the 1990s, the museum was the recipient of national awards: the Prince of Wales Award 1993 and the Shoestring Award (Museum of the Year Award 1996) for the UK museum which achieved the most with the least available financial resources. In 2000, national and regional awards were presented for high standards of professional training.

On 31 July 2003, Prince Charles visited Tenby and the Tenby Museum and Art Gallery to mark the 125th anniversary of the museum's opening.

== Notable people associated with the museum ==
- William Lyons (1776–1849) — lived in Tenby in early 19th century and was a collector and researcher of specimens of natural history. The Lyons shell collection was donated to the Tenby Local Museum by his daughters in 1878.
- Dr. Frederick Daniel Dyster (1810–1893) — a founder member of the museum, he had for many years been interested in marine biology and was the friend and correspondent of T. H. Huxley. Dyster contributed to the early collections of the museum by donating a number of scientific books to the museum's library.
- Charles Allen (1807–1884) — it was at his home at 10 The Norton, Tenby, that the first meeting was held to discuss the formation of a Local Museum for Tenby. Allen came from a well known Pembrokeshire family. After retirement, he was a member of the Town Council and Mayor in 1865 and 1871.
- Edward Laws (1837–1913) — the prime mover in the establishment of a local museum for Tenby and became the first Hon. Secretary of the museum's trustees. Laws was an amateur historian and archaeologist, who was the author of several works including ‘The History of Little England beyond Wales’, ‘The church Book of St Mary the Virgin’ and ‘The Civil War in Pembrokeshire’. In 1877 he had also excavated in the Tenby area with Professor George Rolleston.
- Professor George Rolleston (1829–1881) — Professor of Anatomy and Physiology at Oxford in 1860, he pioneered the teaching of Zoology. He undertook anthropological excavations with Edward Laws in the Tenby area in 1877, and in the following year was invited to perform the opening ceremony of the Tenby Local Museum, which took place on 26 July.
- Edward Rawdon Bingham Power (1811–1896) — a native of Surrey, Power had retired with his family to Tenby after a long career in the civil service in Ceylon. He was a J.P. and served as Mayor of Tenby in 1872. For the remainder of his life, he was one of the most regularly attending members at museum committee meetings and actively supported the museum's interests. He undertook considerable work on behalf of charitable organisations in the town. These included the Tenby Cottage Hospital, of which he was the Hon. Secretary and Treasurer

== Exhibits ==
The museum features exhibits about local history, geology, archaeology, area maritime history and piracy.

The New Gallery features changing exhibits of contemporary art and crafts in various media, and the permanent art collection includes works by such Welsh artists as Gwen and Augustus John, Kyffin Williams, John Piper, Nina Hamnett, Claudia Williams, John Uzzell Edwards and John Knapp Fisher.
