= Lexden Terrace =

Grade II* listed building in Tenby

Coordinates: 51°40′17″N 4°41′46″W

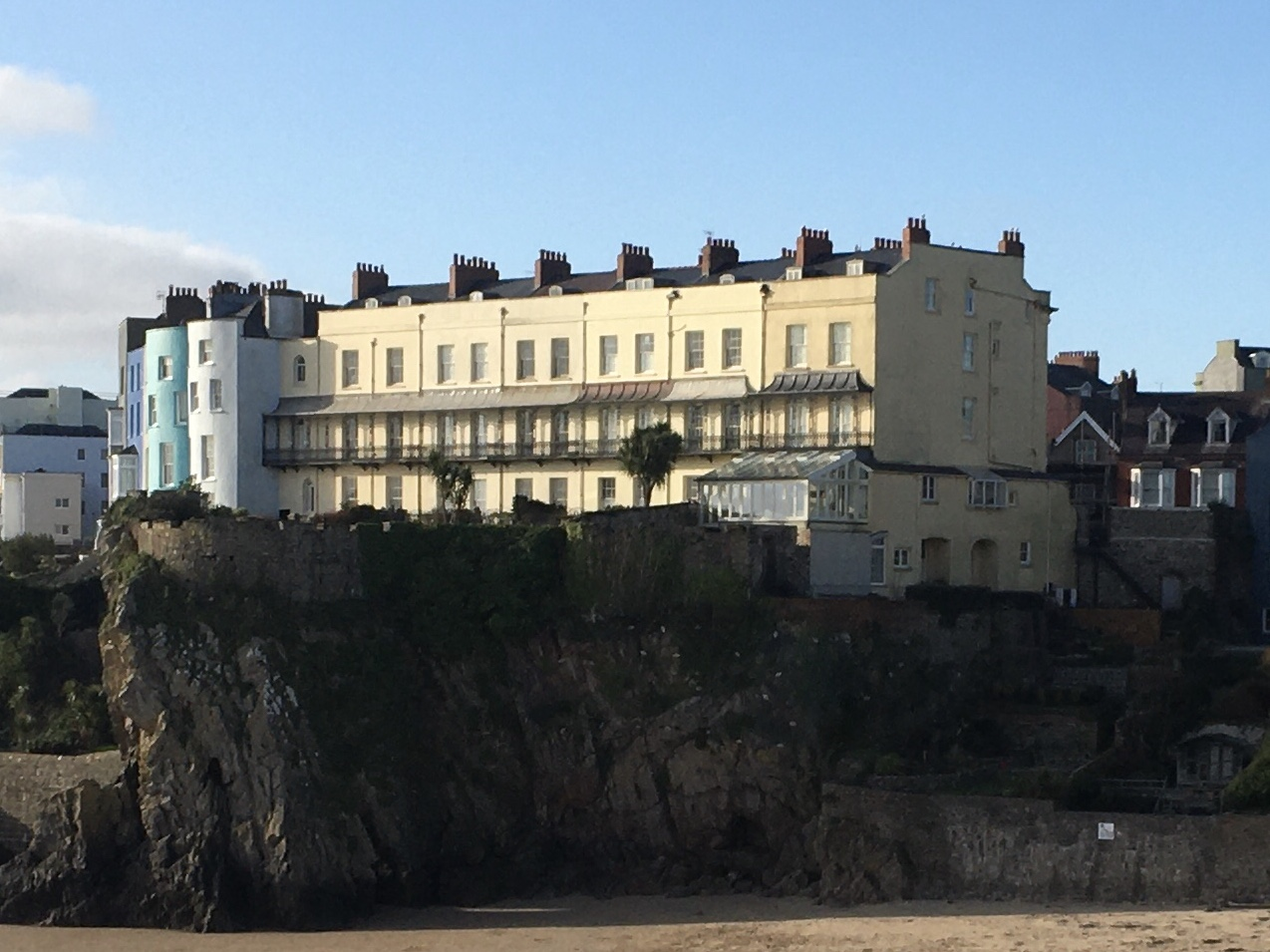
- "Tenby's best [19th-century] work"

General information
- Type: Terraced houses
- Architectural style: Georgian
- Location: Tenby, in Pembrokeshire, Wales
- Completed: 1845 (Nos. 1–5) and 1850 (No. 6)
- Client: John Rees (Nos. 1–5) and Rachel Williams (No. 6)

Lexden Terrace is a row of six Grade II* listed Victorian townhouses on St Julian's Street in the community of Tenby, in Pembrokeshire, Wales. They were built between 1843 and 1850.

== History ==
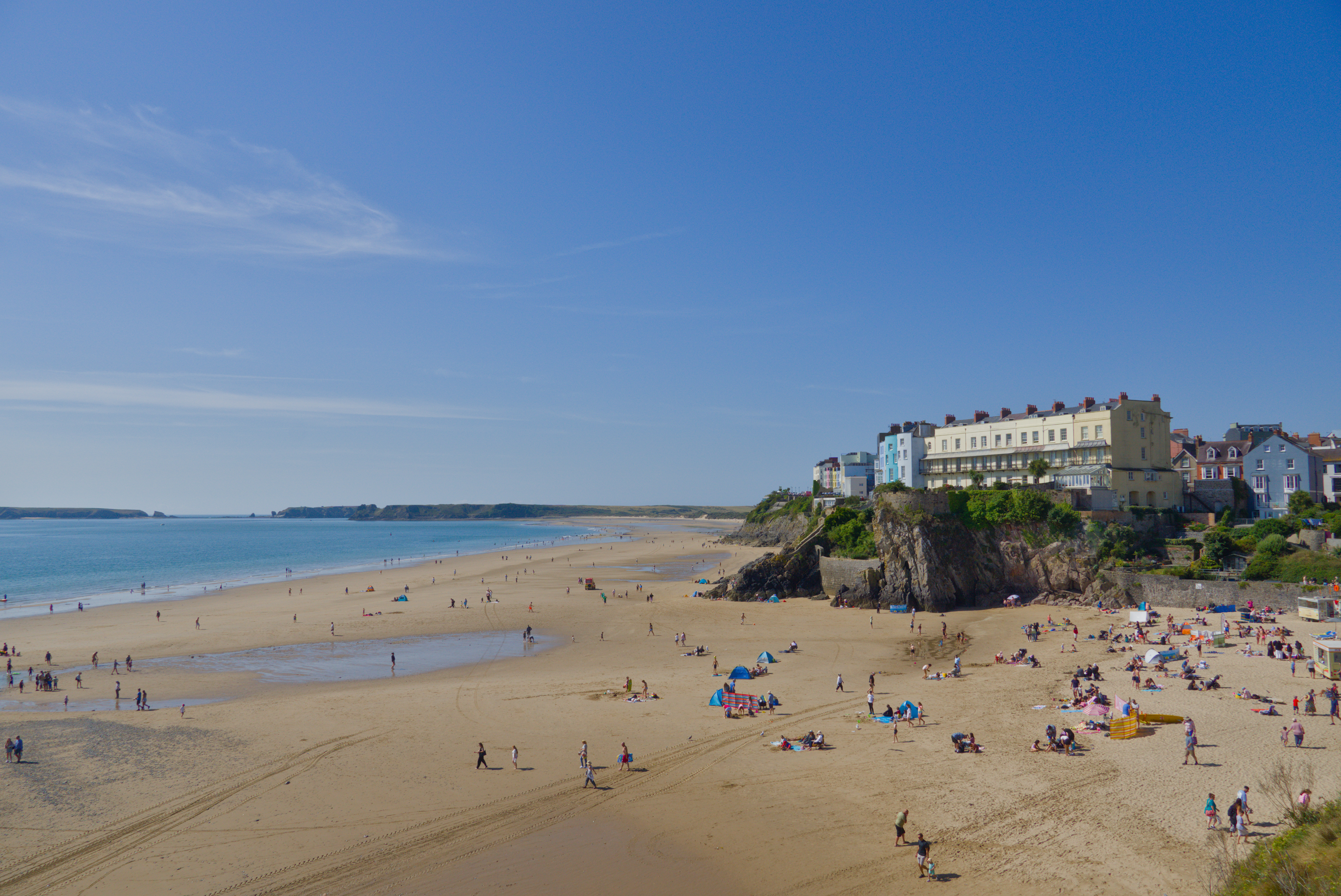
A view of the rear elevation (right) in context from Castle Hill.

Nos. 1–5 were built between 1843 and 1845 for John Rees (1801–1855), a Tenby captain, who drew the first accurate charts of China, which were used in the First Opium War, and made his fortune from opium smuggling. The houses were built by John Smith of Tenby, possibly to the designs of Samuel Burleigh Gabriel, at a cost of £3,174. No. 6, known as Lexden House, was built from 1848 and completed by 1850. Cadw does not list the architect or builder of No. 6, but it largely follows the design of Nos. 1–5.

=== No. 1 ===
John Rees, who commissioned the terrace, lived at No. 1 with his wife, and leased out Nos. 2–5. In 1844, the Reeses had a daughter, who became the suffragist and educational reformer, Emma Maitland. (Note: The Pembrokeshire volume in the Buildings of Wales series states that John Rees resided at No. 6 ("The speculator was John Rees: his house is wider, and distinguished by an Ionic portico"). However, both Cadw and a report on the terrace by the Pembrokeshire Historical Society write that the Reeses did in fact reside at No. 1.) Following Rees' death in 1855, his widow and their daughter continued to live at No. 1 until Mrs Rees' death in 1861 and Maitland's marriage in 1862. Maitland retained ownership until 1922, when Nos. 1–5 were sold as individual houses. No. 1 was bought by Frederick Craven JP, a Bradford worsted manufacturer, whose family had leased the house for holidays since around the 1860s. The house was sold in 1939 to Geraldine Lawrence (d. 1962), a London society hostess who also used the house as a holiday residence. On Lawrence's death in 1962, the house was sold to Irene Clink. No. 1 is now known as St. Catherine's House (the terrace overlooks St Catherine's Island to the rear) and was under offer in 2024 for £1.8m.

=== No. 2 ===
Following Emma Maitland's sale of the terrace, No. 2 was occupied in the 1920s by Mrs E. Fisher, girls' school.

=== No. 3 ===
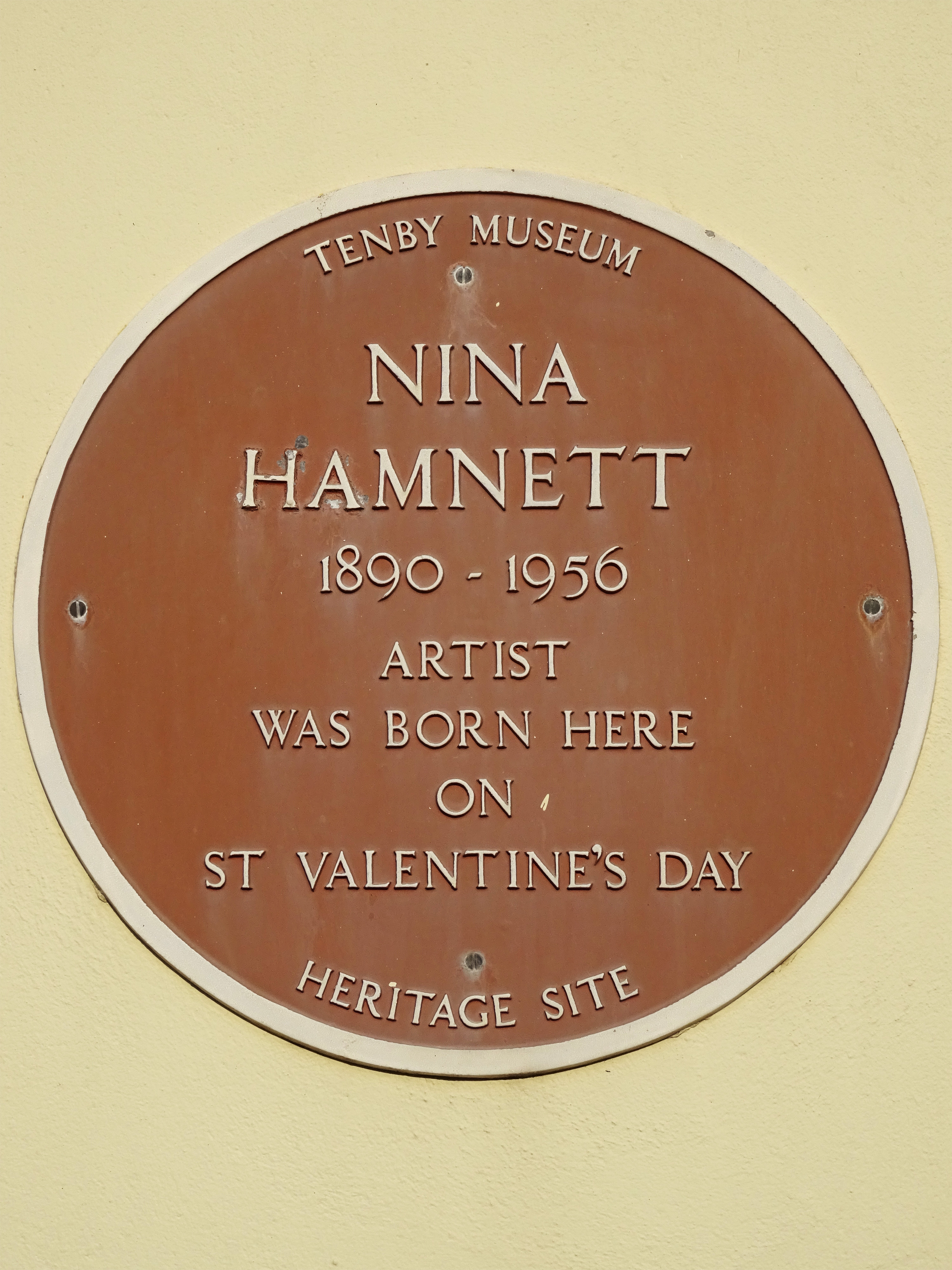
Brown Plaque commemorating Hamnett's birth at No. 3.

The artist, Nina Hamnett, was born at No. 3 in 1890.

=== No. 4 ===
In 1926, No. 4 was occupied by a Mrs Martin.

=== No. 5 ===
When Emma Maitland sold the terrace in 1922, Edwin William John bought No. 5. He was the father of the artists Augustus and Gwen John. In 1948, No. 5 was bought by the aforementioned Geraldine Lawrence (d. 1962) who already owned No. 1.

=== No. 6 (Lexden House) ===
No. 6 was built between 1848 and 1850 for Rachel Williams and used as a lodging house. The date of its contraction is slightly later to Nos. 1–5 which it adjoins, but it continues the overall design of the terrace. It is slightly wider than the other houses and features a formerly castellated porch supported by two Ionic columns. To the rear is a conservatory which was rebuilt in the 1990s. In 1867, No. 6 was bought by Charles Smith, a Llansamlet mine-owner, who renamed it to Lexden House. Smith bought and demolished an adjacent property in order to enlarge the garden and improve access to the house. In 1900, the house was bought by Dr Edward Mansell Bryant, a surgeon and inventor, whose family retained ownership until 1991. In 2016, the house was offered for sale for £935,000.

== Architecture ==
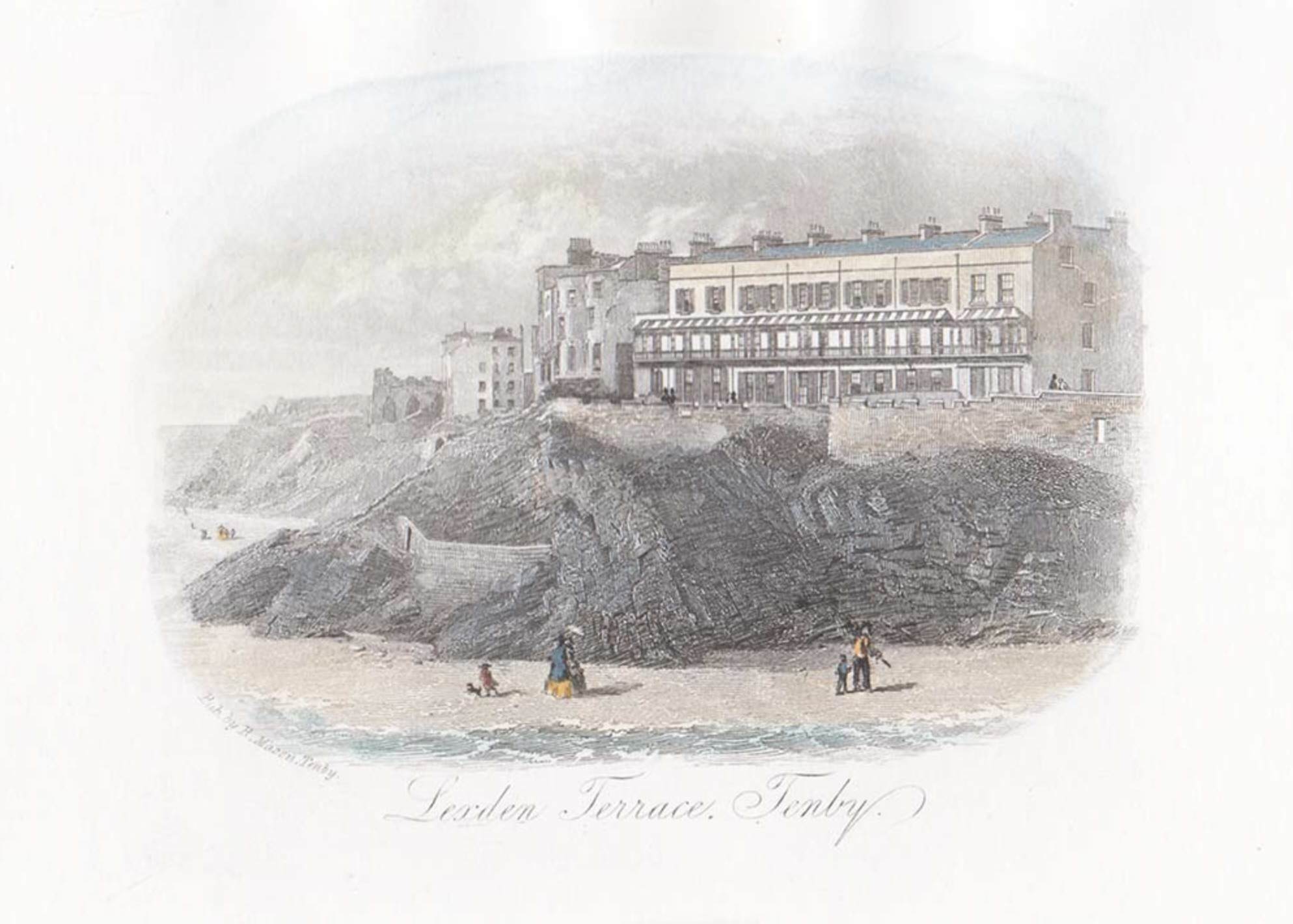
Engraving of the rear elevation by Richard Mason of c. 1870.

Lexden Terrace was initially consisted of only Nos. 1–5, built between 1843 and 1845 by John Smith of Tenby. Cadw states that the architect may have been Samuel Burleigh Gabriel, whereas Pevsner suggests that John Smith built to his own design and that the "aim was to bring a little slice of Brighton of Cheltenham to West Wales." No. 6 (Lexden House) was built later, between 1848 and 1850; Cadw does not list the builder nor architect for No. 6, but it continues the overall terrace design. The terrace is in the Georgian style and is rendered in stucco. Each house is of three storeys with a basement and of two bays, flanked by what Cadw and Pevsner describe as "giant Ionic pilasters" on the upper two floors. No. 6 features some differences including an additional pilaster between it and No. 5; channelling to the slightly wider front elevation; a formerly castellated Ionic porch leading to a Tudor-arched door; and a conservatory to the rear, restored in the 1990s. There is a recessed addition where the terrace adjoins No. 7 Rock House which features two arched doorways, one blank, one with a Gothic panelled door. The rear elevation features a first floor balcony with decorative cast-iron railings which extends the length of the terrace. Nos. 1–5 are said to have cantilevered stairs and a glazed dome, and No. 6 to have particularly good plasterwork. Each house was disgnated as a Grade II* listed building on 19 March 1951 "for special architectural interest as part of the finest terrace in Tenby." The rubble forecourt walls, dressed grey limestone piers, and railings were designated as Grade II listed buildings on the same date as being of "group value with the terrace and other buildings in St Julian's Street."
