= Manorbier Dovecote =

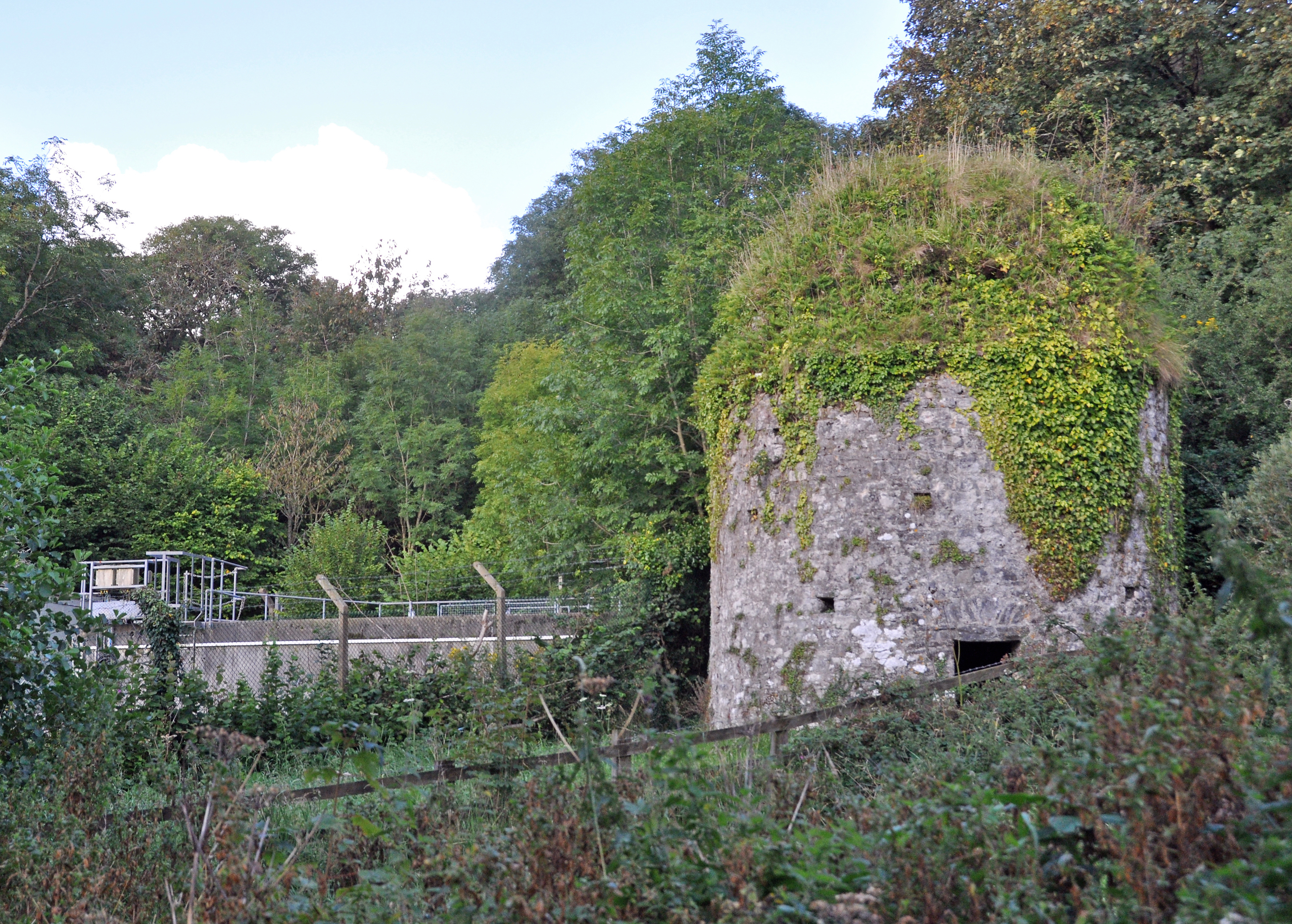
- "the best-preserved circular dovecote with a domed roof surviving in South Wales"

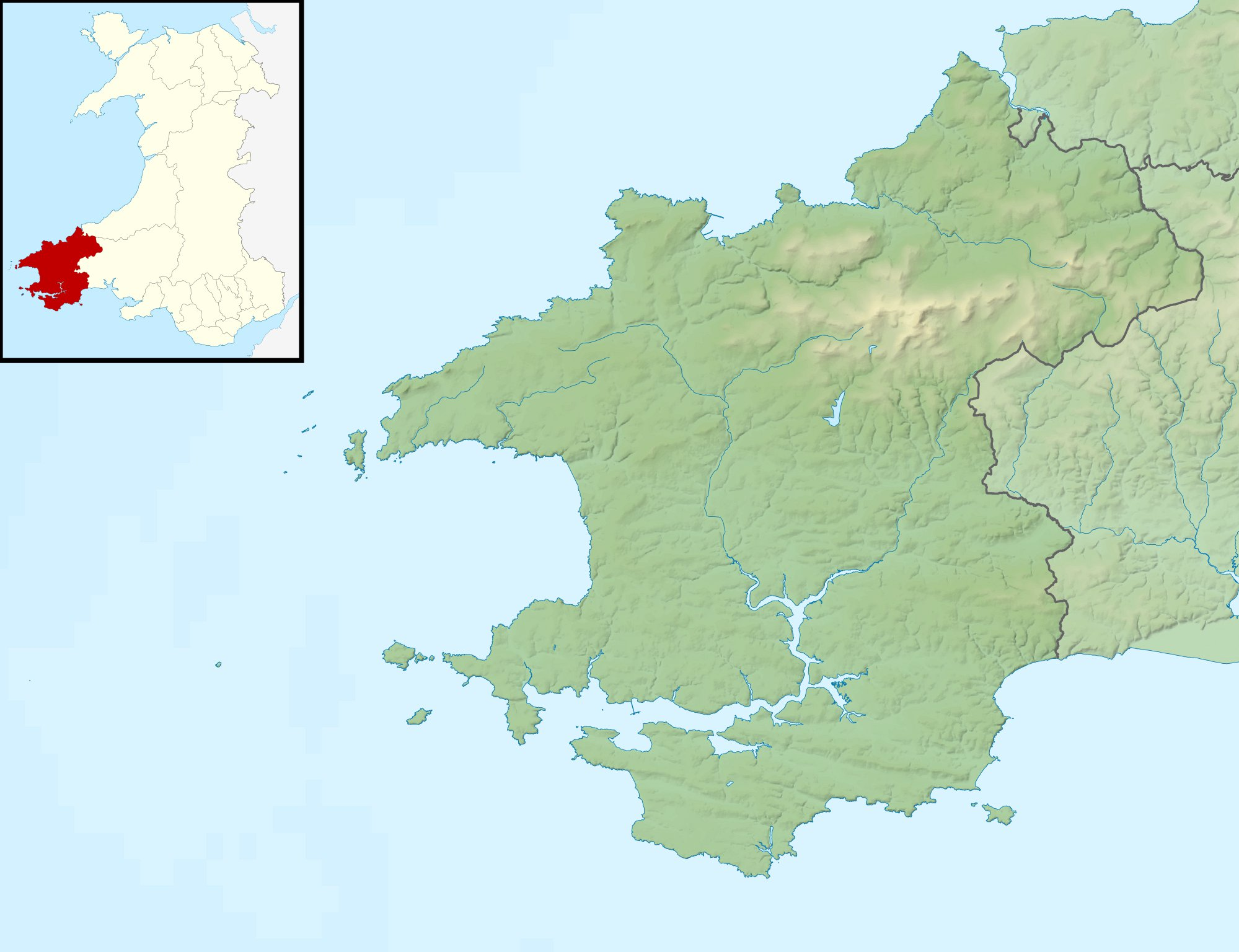
- Location within Pembrokeshire
- 51.646°N 4.8015°W
- Type: Dovecote
- Location: Manorbier, Pembrokeshire

History
- Built: 12th/13th century

Site notes
- Architectural style: Vernacular
- Governing body: Privately owned

Listed Building – Grade II*
- Official name: Dovecote
- Designated: 14 May 1970
- Reference no.: 5977

Scheduled monument
- Official name: Manorbier Dovecote
- Designated: 22 July 1994
- Reference no.: PE459

Manorbier Dovecote stands in the village of Manorbier, Pembrokeshire, Wales. It is within the Manorbier Castle estate, about 100m north-west of the castle. Dating from the 12th or 13th centuries, the dovecote is a Grade II* listed building and a scheduled monument.

== History ==
The keeping and breeding of doves or pigeons in Britain dates back to the Norman Conquest. (Note: It has been suggested that domesticated pigeons were introduced to Britain by the Romans. Pigeon holes have been identified in the structures at the Roman town of Venta Silurum (modern-day Caerwent).) The birds provided sources of food through their meat and eggs; their feathers were used for the decoration of clothing, and for domestic purposes such as bedding; and their droppings were used as a fertilizer. The keeping of birds was a high-status activity, and regulated by law; consequently dovecotes are generally attached to large estates, either manorial or ecclesiastical. (Note: In his study of 1891, Pigeon Houses in Herefordshire and Gower, Alfred Watkins identifies three of the castle-type further along the coast from Manorbier; at Oystermouth, Penrice, and Oxwich.) Once prevalent throughout Britain, in the 17th century there reportedly 25,000 in England alone, many have decayed or been demolished in the modern period. (Note: In his study, A Book of Dovecotes published in 1920, Arthur Owens Cooke lamented the destruction of so many dovecotes in the early 20th century and implored owners not to permit the growth of ivy on those that remained; "above all set [your] faces against ivy, that most dangerous foe of masonry. To turn the dovecote into a green bower may be picturesque, but means disaster in the end".)

The Manorbier Dovecote stands about 100m north-west of the castle. Its build date is uncertain. The Royal Commission on the Ancient and Historical Monuments of Wales (RCAHMW) suggests the 12th or 13th centuries. Cadw also posits a medieval construction period, but noting similarities with the dovecote at Angle, considers that Manorbier could also be of the 15th century. The dovecote was partially repaired in the 19th century and was fully restored in the 21st.

== Architecture and description ==
The dovecote is about 5m in height and circular with a domed roof. Internally there are twelve rows of nesting boxes, with accommodation for about 240 birds. In their Pembrokeshire volume in the Buildings of Wales series, Thomas Lloyd, Julian Orbach and Robert Scourfield describe it as a, "fine, medieval circular dovecote with domical cobelled roof". Cadw considers it the best remaining of its type in South Wales. The Manorbier dovecote is a Grade II* listed building and a Scheduled monument.

== Sources ==
- Lloyd, Thomas; Orbach, Julian; Scourfield, Robert (2004). Pembrokeshire. Buildings of Wales. New Haven, US and London: Yale University Press. ISBN 978-0-300-10178-2. OCLC 52946802.
- Cooke, Arthur Owens (1920). A Book of Dovecotes. London: T. N. Foulis. OCLC 1965568.
- Watkins, Alfred (1891). "Pigeon Houses in Herefordshire and Gower". Archaeological Journal. 48. London: Longman.
