= Nina Hamnett =

Welsh artist (1890–1956)

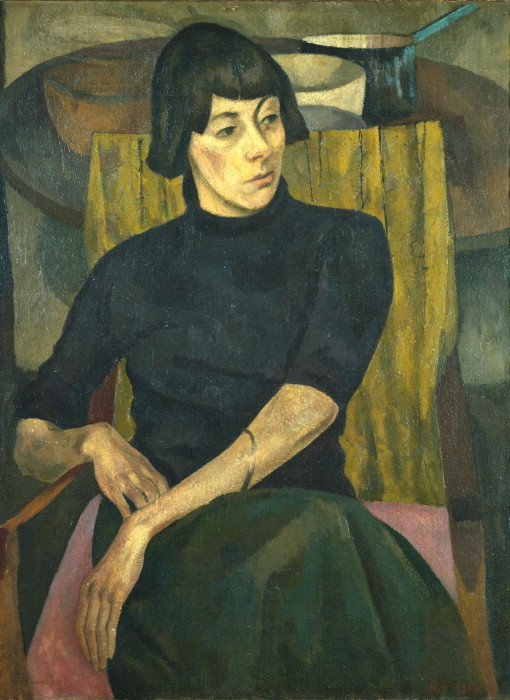
- 1917 portrait of Nina Hamnett painted by Roger Fry (Courtauld Gallery, London)
- Born: 14 February 1890; Tenby, Pembrokeshire, Wales
- Died: 16 December 1956 (aged 66); London, England
- Occupations: Artist and writer
- Known for: Queen of Bohemia

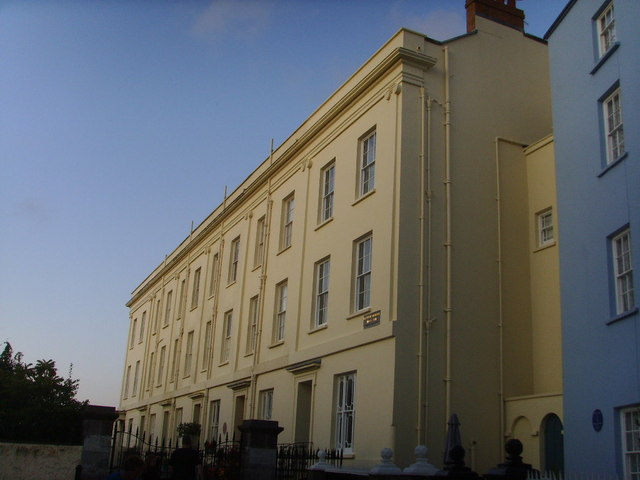
Hamnett was born at No.3, Lexden Terrace, Tenby, Wales

Nina Hamnett (14 February 1890 – 16 December 1956) was a Welsh artist and writer, and an expert on sailors' shanties, who became known as the Queen of Bohemia.

== Early life ==
Hamnett was born in the small coastal town of Tenby, Pembrokeshire, Wales, eldest of the four children of George Edward Hamnett (born 1864), a captain in the Royal Army Service Corps, and Mary Elizabeth De Blois (1863/4-1947), daughter of Captain William Edwin Archdeacon, a Royal Navy officer and cartographer. Hamnett was sent to a private boarding school at Westgate-on-Sea before moving on, aged 12, to the Royal School for Daughters of Officers of the Army in Bath, Somerset, from 1902 to 1905. Her father, having been dishonourably discharged from the army, took work as a taxi driver. Her education had to be funded by her aunts and by a loan against a future bequest. From 1906 to 1907 she studied at the Pelham Art School and then at the London School of Art until 1910. In 1914 she went to Montparnasse, Paris, to study at Marie Vassilieff's Academy.

While studying in London, she met and posed for Henri Gaudier-Brzeska, who sculpted a series of nude bronzes. During this period she became friendly with Olivia Shakespear and Ezra Pound. She went on to have a love affair with Brzeska, and later with Amedeo Modigliani and Roger Fry.

On her first night in the Bohemian community she went to the café La Rotonde where the man at the next table introduced himself as "Modigliani, painter and Jew". In addition to making close friends with Modigliani, Pablo Picasso, Serge Diaghilev, and Jean Cocteau, she stayed for a while at La Ruche, where many of the leading members of the avant-garde lived at the time. In Montparnasse in 1914 she also met her future husband, the Norwegian artist Edgar de Bergen, who later changed his name to Roald Kristian to sound less German. She would remain married for forty years, but her relationship with her husband lasted only three years. In 1916 her husband was deported as an unregistered alien.

Her work was well regarded by Walter Sickert, who endeavoured to advise her on her painting, but she lacked his dedication and revelled in not taking advice. Sickert used her as a model, and also painted her with her husband in 1915–16 in The Little Tea Party: Nina Hamnett and Roald Kristian.

== Flamboyant lifestyle ==
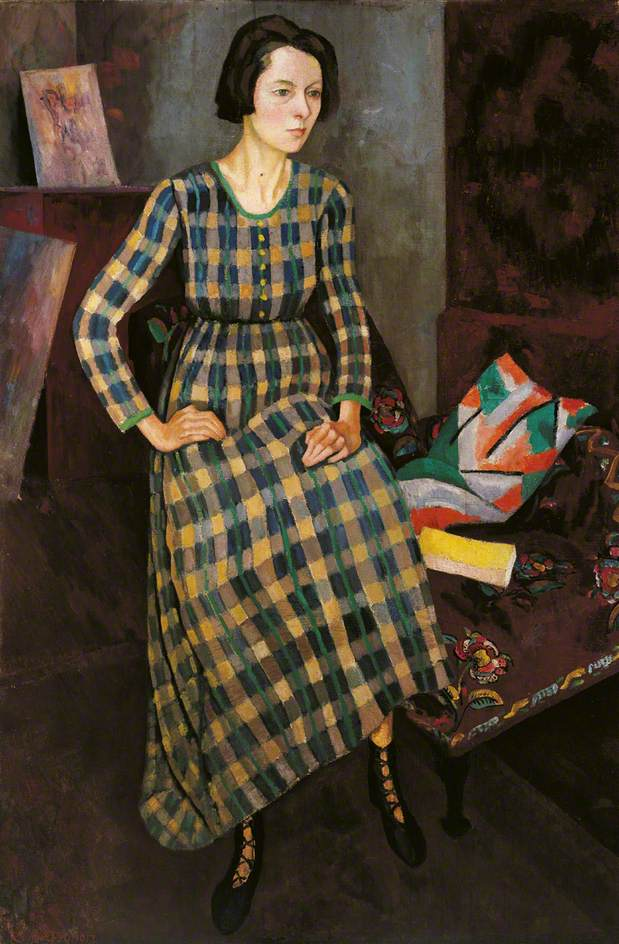
Nina Hamnett painted by Roger Fry, 1917, in a dress designed by Vanessa Bell and made at the Omega Workshops

Flamboyantly unconventional, and openly bisexual, Hamnett once danced nude on a Montparnasse café table just for the "hell of it". She drank heavily, was sexually promiscuous, and kept numerous lovers and close associations within the artistic community. Very quickly, she became a well-known bohemian personality throughout Paris and modelled for many artists. Her reputation soon reached back to London, where for a time, she went to work making or decorating fabrics, clothes, murals, furniture, and rugs at the Omega Workshops, which was directed by Roger Fry, Vanessa Bell, and Duncan Grant.

Her artistic creations were widely exhibited during World War I, including at the Royal Academy in London as well as the Salon d'Automne in Paris. Back in England, she taught at the Westminster Technical Institute from 1917 to 1918. After Kristian left, she took up with another free spirit, composer E. J. Moeran.

From the mid-1920s until the end of World War II, the area known as Fitzrovia was London's main Bohemian artistic centre. The place took its name from the popular Fitzroy Tavern on the corner of Charlotte and Windmill Streets that formed the area's centre. Home of the café life in Fitzrovia, it was Hamnett's favourite hangout as well as that of her friend from her home town, Augustus John, and later another Welshman, the poet Dylan Thomas.

== Later life ==
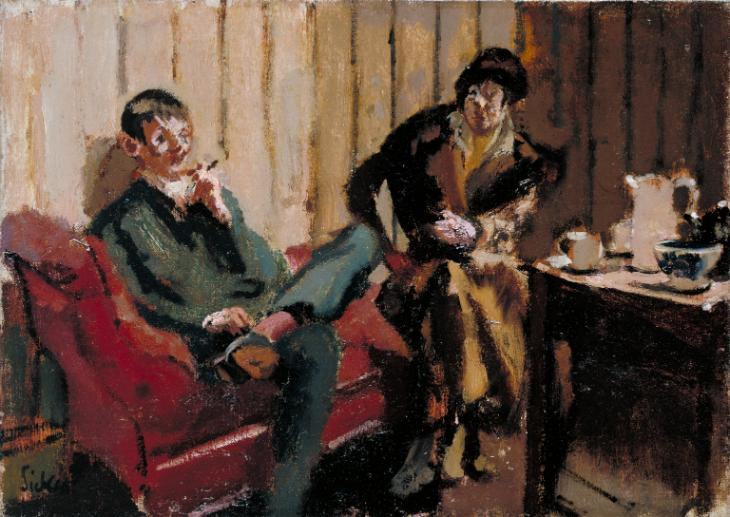
The Little Tea Party (1915–16) by Walter Sickert depicts Hamnett and her husband.

In 1932 Hamnett published Laughing Torso, a tale of her bohemian life, which became a bestseller in the UK and US. The notorious occultist Aleister Crowley unsuccessfully sued her and the publisher for libel over allegations of black magic made in her book.

Although she won the case, the situation profoundly affected her for the remainder of her life. Alcoholism would soon overtake her many talents and the tragic "Queen of the Fitzroy" spent a good part of the last few decades of her life at the bar (usually that of the Fitzroy Tavern), trading anecdotes for drinks.

Twenty-three years after her first book Laughing Torso was published, Hamnett, in poor health, released a follow-up book titled: Is She a Lady?

Hamnett died in 1956 from complications after falling out of her apartment window and being impaled on the fence forty feet below. Her last words were "Why don't they let me die?"

The American novelist Julius Horwitz (1920–1986) portrayed Hamnett in his 1964 novel about London during World War Two, titled Can I Get There By Candlelight. Horwitz was stationed outside London during World War Two, and was befriended by Hamnett as a young soldier when he would go into London on a three-day pass. A biography, Nina Hamnett: Queen of Bohemia by Denise Hooker, was published in 1986. In 2011, Hamnett was the subject of a short film by writer/director Chris Ward— What Shall We Do with the Drunken Sailor, starring Siobhan Fahey. In November 2019, the Fitzrovia Chapel hosted an exhibition called Nina Hamnett – Everybody was Furious.

== See also ==
- Betty May
- List of Bloomsbury Group people
