= Caerfarchell =

Village in Pembrokeshire, Wales

Coordinates: 51.90°N 5.21°W

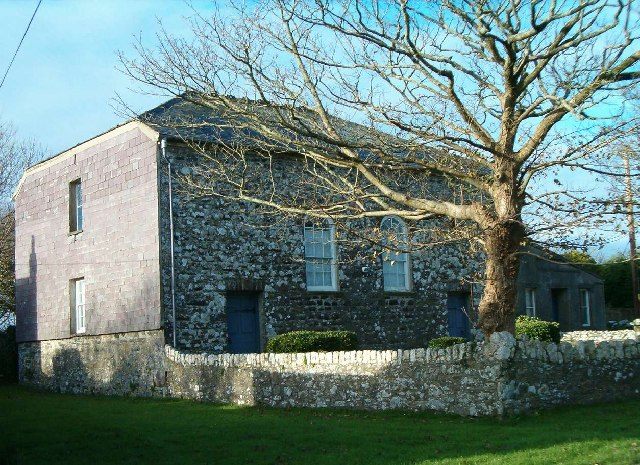
- Chapel at Caerfarchell

- Location within Pembrokeshire
- OS grid reference: SM795270
- Principal area: Pembrokeshire
- Country: Wales
- Sovereign state: United Kingdom
- Police: Dyfed-Powys
- Fire: Mid and West Wales
- Ambulance: Welsh
- UK Parliament: Mid and South Pembrokeshire

Caerfarchell (Welsh pronunciation: [kaɪrvɑːrxɛɬ]) is a small village in Pembrokeshire, Wales, 3 miles northeast of St Davids, close by the A487 road. It is in the community of St Davids and the Cathedral Close.

== Description ==
Several houses are built around a small village green.

In 2001 the Pembrokeshire Coast National Park Authority drew up a conservation statement with the help of villagers.

== History ==
It is believed the village originated in the 14th or 15th centuries. Early medieval burials have been recorded. An early 19th century farm building opposite the chapel is a Grade II-listed building and there are nine other listed buildings in the vicinity.

== Chapel ==
A Calvinist Methodist Chapel was built in 1763 and replaced by the current building in 1827. It is Grade II* listed.
