= Dovecote, Angle =

Dovecote
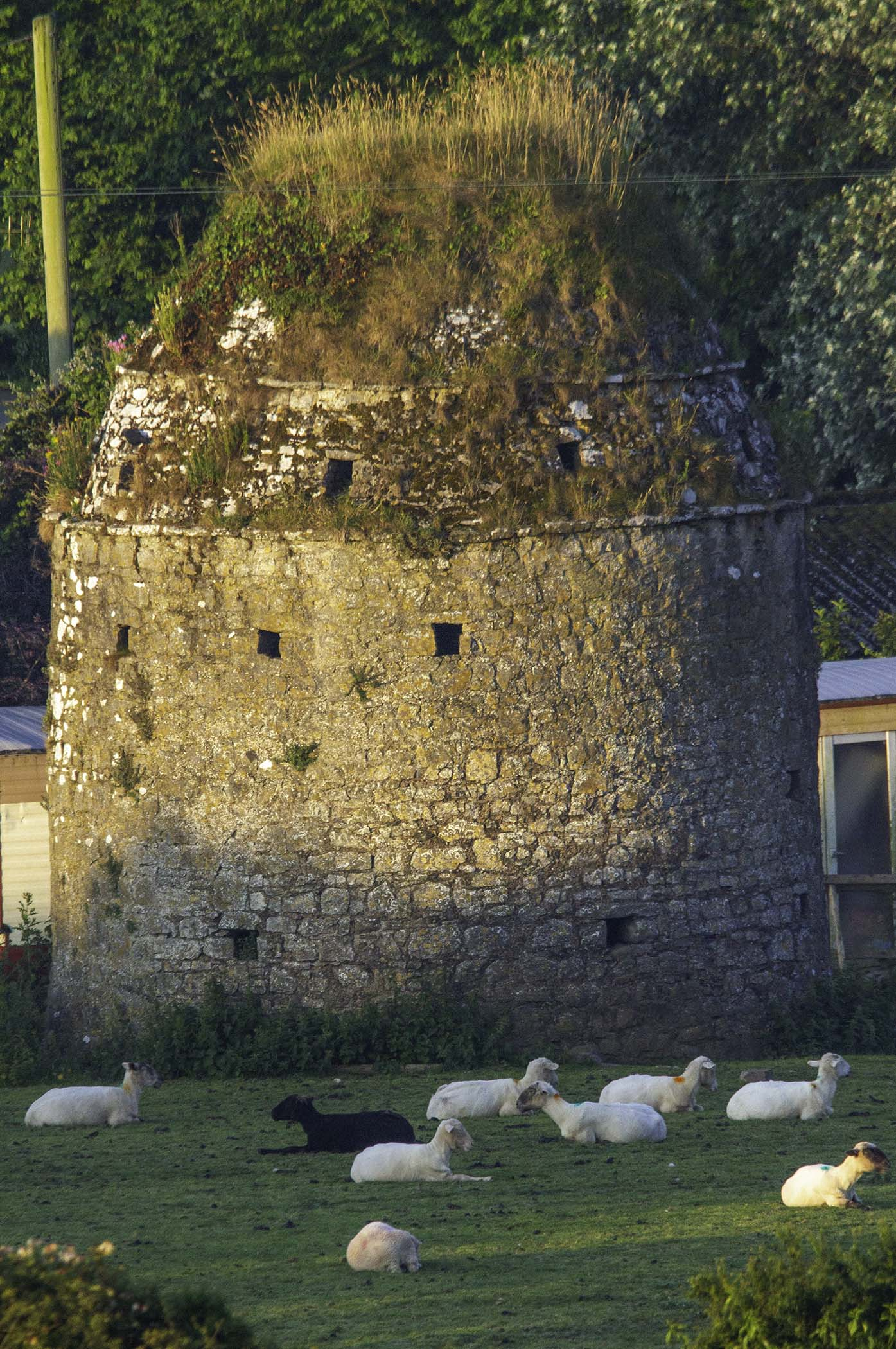

- Location within Wales

General information
- Status: Completed
- Location: Angle, Pembrokeshire, Wales
- Coordinates: 51.685777°N 5.088497°W

Technical details
- Material: Sandstone

Website
- Cadw

References
- Cadw 5922

Dovecote is a Grade II*–listed dovecote in the community of Angle, Pembrokeshire, Wales, which dates back to the 15th century. It was listed on 14 May 1970 by Cadw. It is additionally designated as a scheduled monument.

It has a circular plan with open eye at the apex of the dome, and most probably built to serve the Old Rectory. It is made of sandstone. Inside it has 14 rows of 30 nesting boxes and a large number of flight holes horizontally within the walls, though some are blocked. This type is often found in Cornwall but is rare in Wales.

== Location ==
This building is in a field immediately north of Castle Farm.
