= Richard Mason (Welsh author) =

Richard Mason (c. 1816 – 26 December 1881) was a printer and author. He is believed to have been a native of Herefordshire, but settled in Tenby, Wales.

In 1850 he took on the publishing and printing of Archaeologia Cambrensis at his sole risk for a share of the fees from subscribers who at that time numbered only 130. In 1855 the Cambrian Archaeological Association assumed the role of publisher but retained Mason as their printer. In 1884 he was also involved with the Cambrian Journal, the journal of the Cambrian Institute, which he printed in Tenby and published in conjunction with Longmans & Co, J. Russell Smith and J. Peterham, all of London.

== Works ==
- A Guide to the Town of Tenby and its Neighbourhood (1852)
- Tales and Traditions of Tenby (1858)
