= Wildenstein (disambiguation) =

Wildenstein is a village and commune in the Haut-Rhin département of north-eastern France.

Wildenstein may also refer to:

== Places ==
- Wildenstein (Verwaltungsverband), a municipal association in Saxony, Germany
- Château de Wildenstein, a ruined castle in the Alsace, France
- Lac de Kruth-Wildenstein, a lake in Haut-Rhin, France
- Wildenstein Castle (Bubendorf), a castle in Bubendorf, Basel-Land, Switzerland
- Wildenstein Castle (Leibertingen), a castle in Baden-Württemberg, Germany
- Wildenstein & Company Building, in Manhattan, New York

== People ==
- Georges Wildenstein (1892–1963), French gallery owner, art dealer, art collector, editor and art historian
- Daniel Wildenstein (1917–2001), art dealer and scholar, and a thoroughbred race horse owner and breeder, son of Georges Wildenstein
- Alec N. Wildenstein (1940–2008), French, art dealer and racehorse owner, son of Daniel Wildenstein
- Jocelyn Wildenstein (1940–2024), Swiss-American New York socialite and icon known for extensive facial surgeries, ex-wife of Alec Wildenstein
- Guy Wildenstein (born 1945), French-American art dealer and racehorse owner, son of Daniel Wildenstein and head of the Wildenstein institute

== Other ==
- Wildenstein & Company, an art dealership
- Wildenstein Index Number, an item in a numerical system published in catalogues by Daniel Wildenstein
- Prix Daniel Wildenstein, a Group 2 flat horse race in France
- The Wildenstein Institute, a center for art history research
