= Wildenstein & Company =

International private art dealership

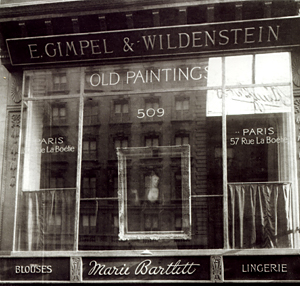
Façade of the former headquarters of the Wildenstein Gallery on New York's Fifth Avenue in 1907

Wildenstein & Company, a private art dealership, was founded in Paris by Nathan Wildenstein in the mid-19th century and run by his family ever since. The Wildenstein Institute, established by Nathan's son Georges, maintains one of the largest art history reference libraries in the world.

== History ==
The Wildenstein Gallery, which became Wildenstein & Company, was founded in Paris during the 1870s by the Alsatian Jewish entrepreneur Nathan Wildenstein, bringing together 18th and 19th century French paintings, sculptures, and drawings, and older works by Italian, Dutch, Flemish, and Spanish masters. By the turn of the century, the gallery was one of the most prominent in the French capital. Nevertheless, Wildenstein considered the emerging North American market to be more promising. He partnered with the art dealers Ernest and René Gimpel, with whom he opened Gimpel & Wildenstein in New York in 1903. Thirty years later, the gallery moved from Fifth Avenue to a building commissioned by architect Horace Trumbauer. In 1925, the gallery opened a branch in London and, in 1929, another in Buenos Aires.

With Nathan's death in 1934, his son, Georges Wildenstein, took over the gallery. Georges directed the Gazette des Beaux-Arts and published numerous works related to 19th-century French art. He was posthumously honored by giving his name to the São Paulo Museum of Art's pinacoteca, to whom he passed on numerous works under special payment conditions. Daniel Wildenstein took over the direction of the gallery after the death of his father in 1963, specializing in Impressionist painting and writing catalogues raisonées and reference works. He was also editor of the Gazette des Beaux-Arts and a member of the Institut de France. He opened a Wildenstein branch in Tokyo.

In 1993, Daniel established a joint venture with the Pace Gallery, one of the leading art galleries focusing on contemporary American production, creating PaceWildenstein. However, as collecting became more specialized, the concept of "one-stop shopping" for high-end art buyers became less sustainable. The two galleries separated back to their original names in 2010. Pace chairman Arne Glimcher and Wildenstein both stated that the split was "amicable".

In 1995, Puerto Rican journalist Hector Feliciano published The Lost Museum: The Nazi Conspiracy to Steal the World's Greatest Works of Art, accusing the gallery's former director Georges Wildenstein of receiving and reselling works looted during the Nazi occupation of France. In 2001, Wildenstein was formally accused of selling eight manuscripts from the 15th, 16th and 17th centuries that would not have belonged to the gallery but to a Jewish collector.

== Works sold ==
Throughout the 20th century, Wildenstein became one of the largest and most successful art galleries in the world, selling or reselling a large number of universal masterpieces to museums, institutions and private collectors in the United States, Europe, Japan and South America. Wildenstein clients include Calouste Gulbenkian, Edmond de Rothschild, John Pierpont Morgan, Assis Chateaubriand, Henry Ford II, Jean Paul Getty, and Emil Georg Bührle among others. Below is a selection of masterpieces marketed by Wildenstein.

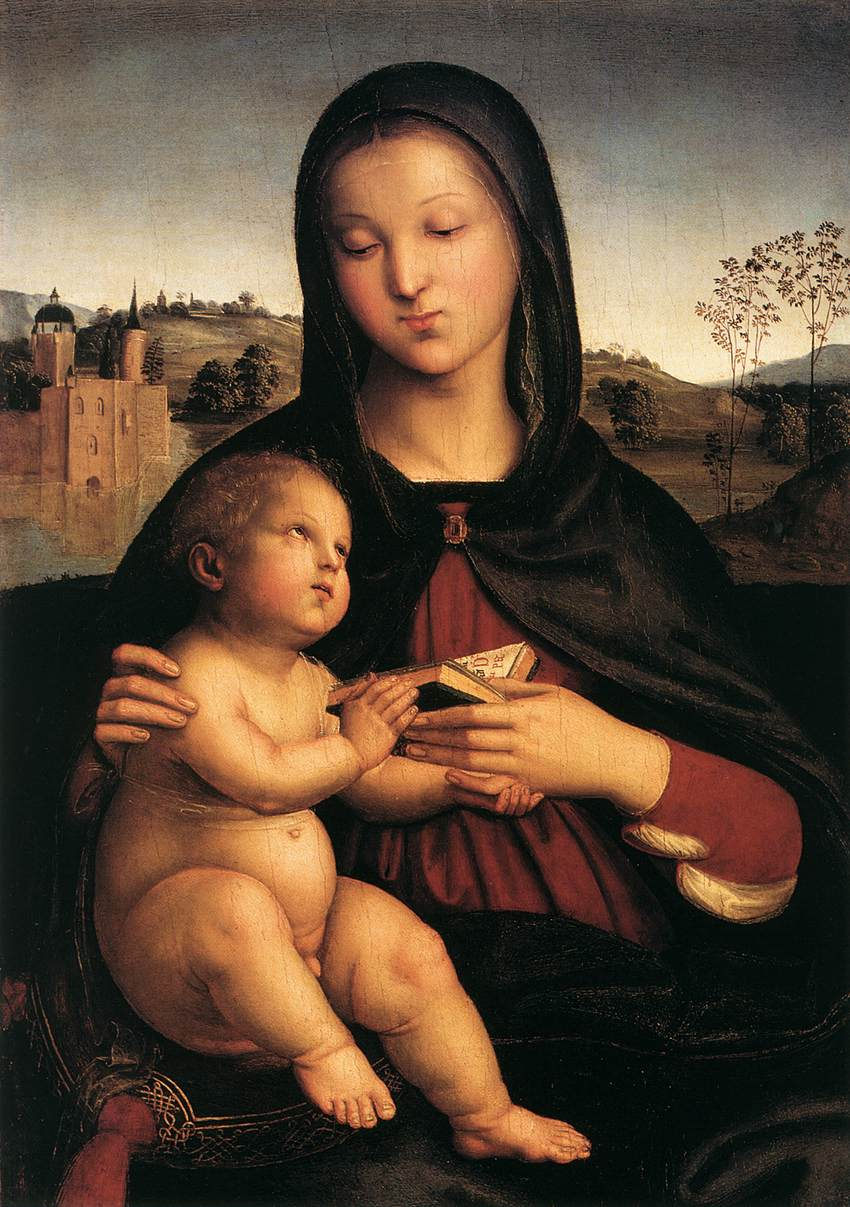
Raphael - Madonna and Child, c.1503. Norton Simon Museum.

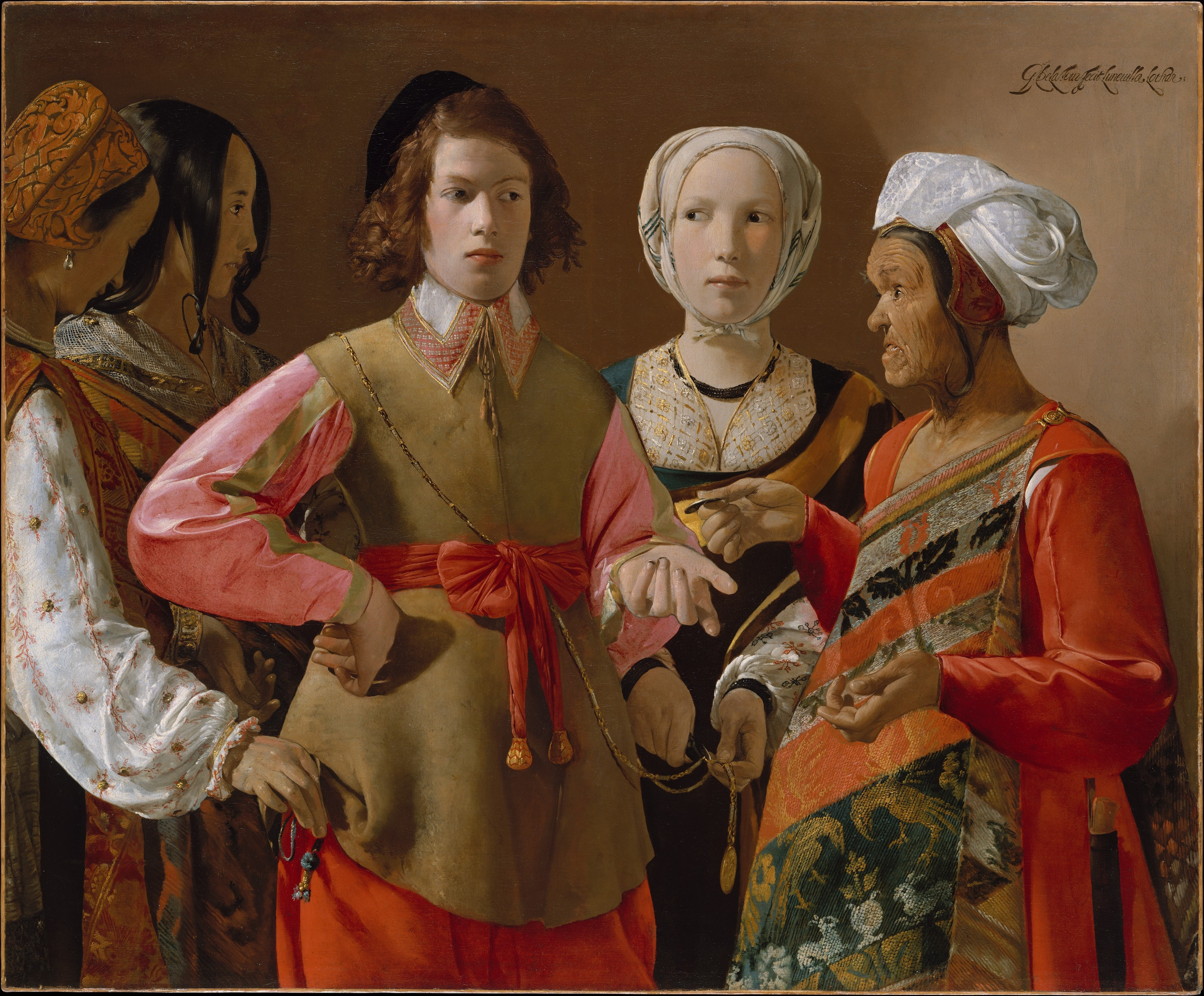
Georges de La Tour - The Fortune-Teller, 1633-1639. Metropolitan Museum of Art.

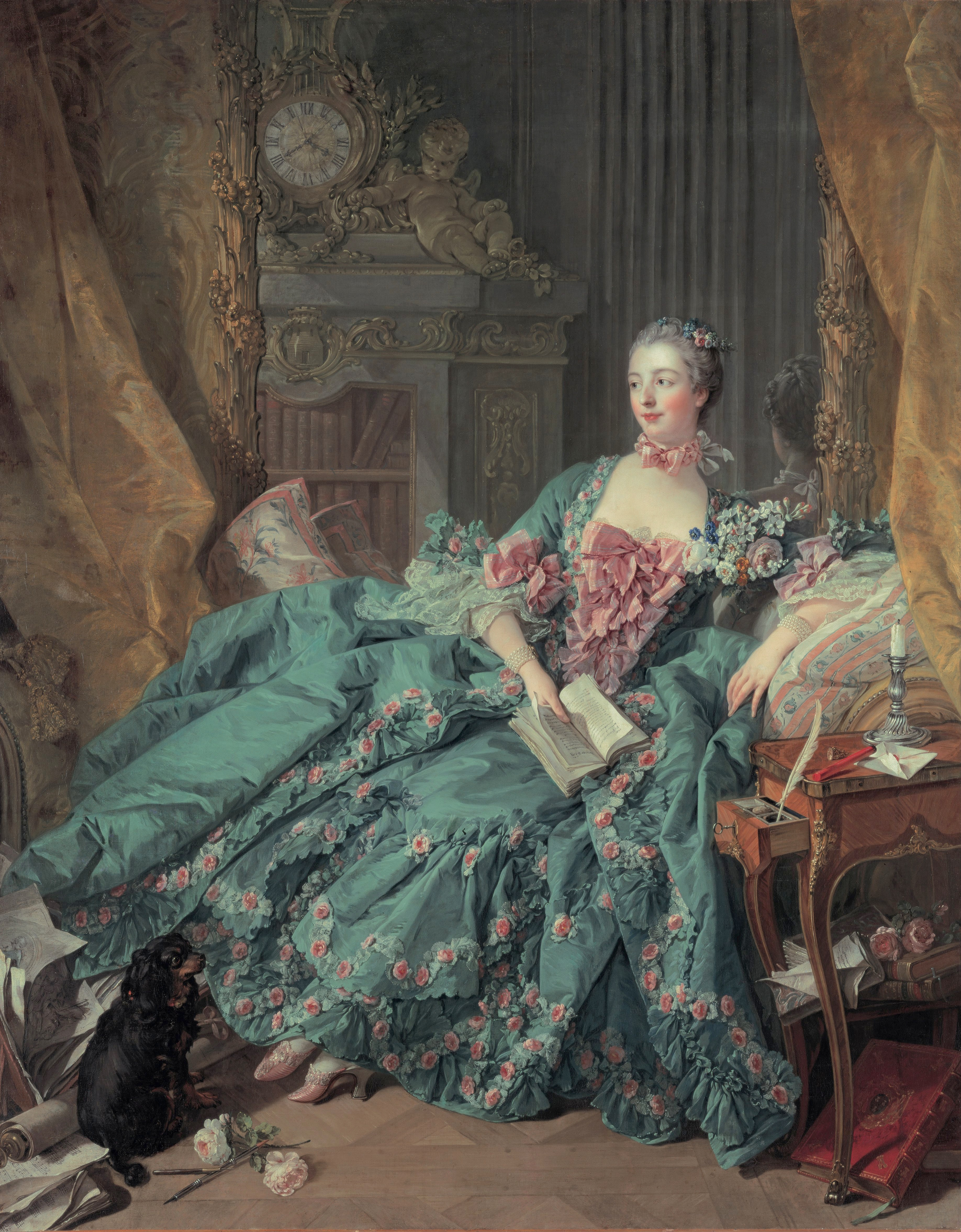
François Boucher - Portrait of Madame Pompadour, 1756. Alte Pinakothek.

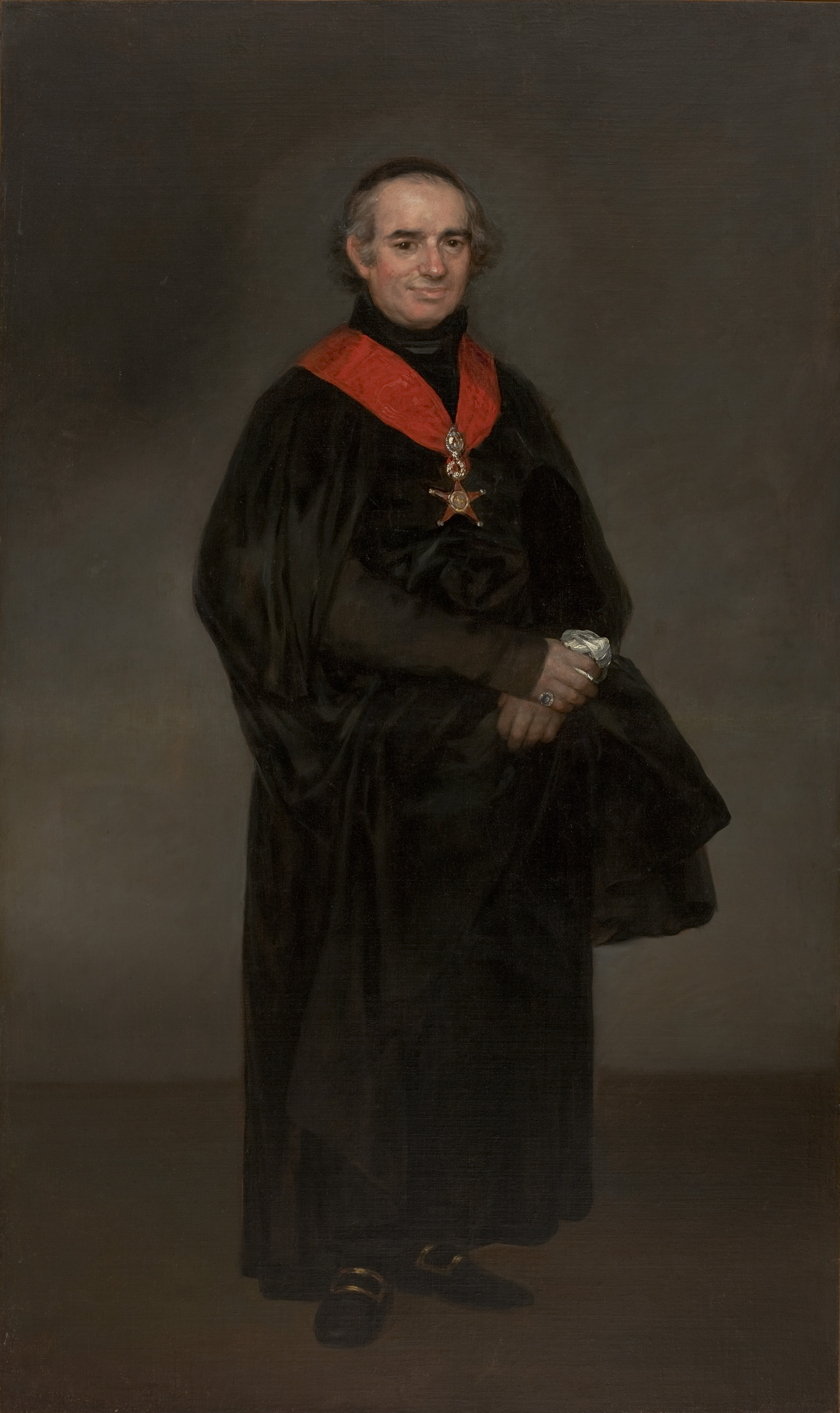
Francisco de Goya - Portrait of Don Juan Antonio Llorente, 1809-1813. Museu de Arte de São Paulo (gift of Antonio Sanches Galdeano).

Jacques-Louis David - Portrait of Napoleon Bonaparte, 1812. National Gallery of Art.

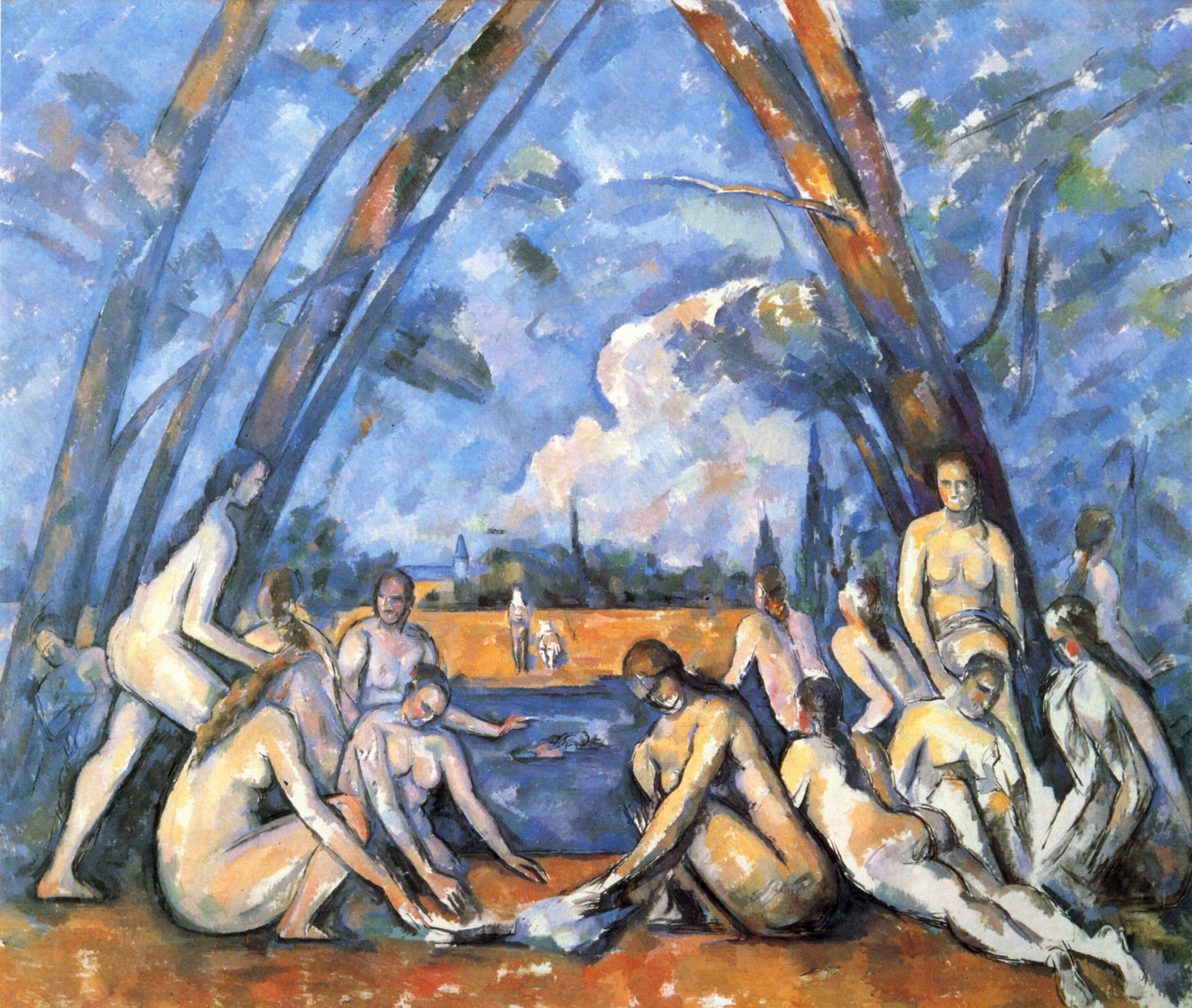
Paul Cézanne - Les grandes baigneuses, c. 1906. Philadelphia Museum of Art.

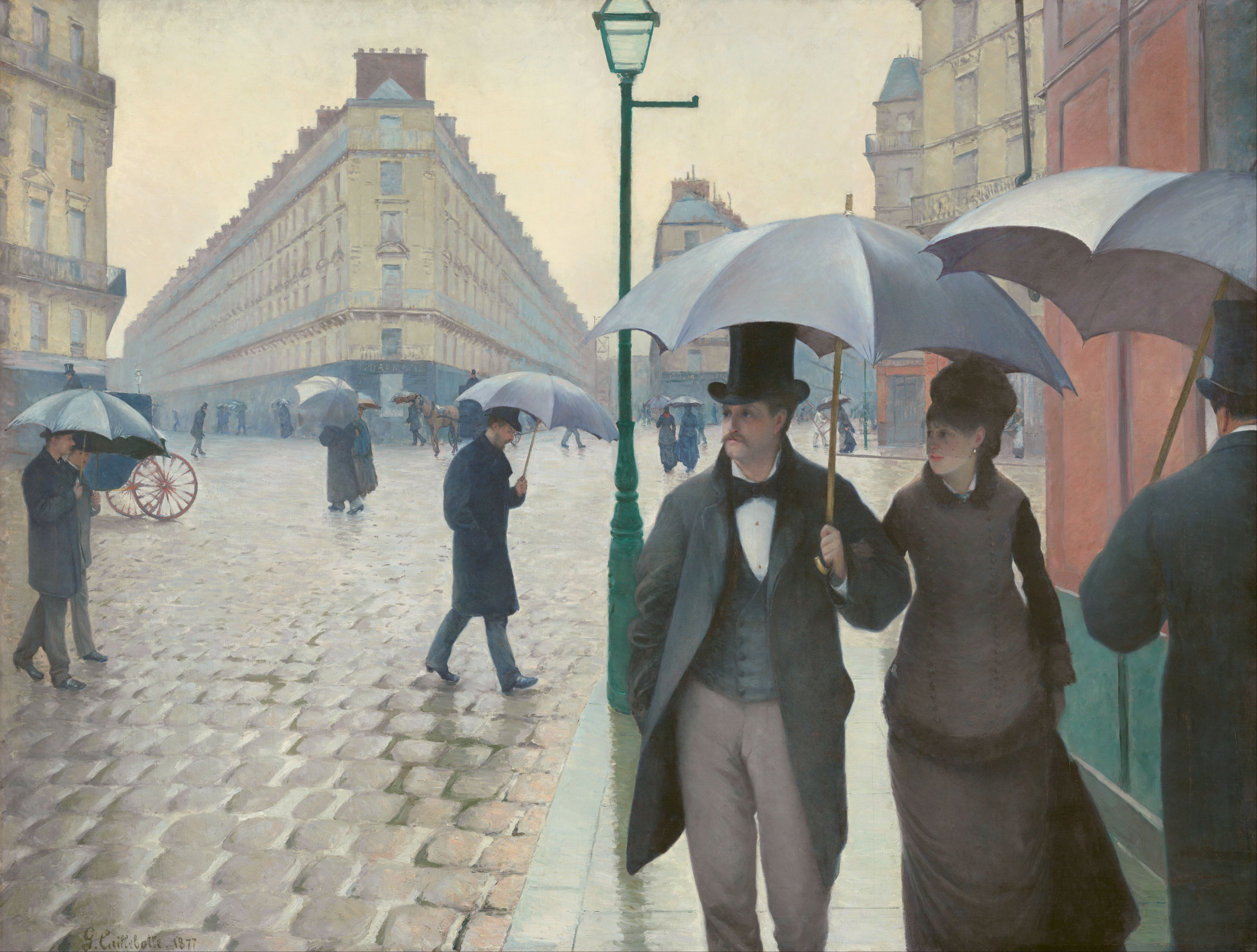
Gustave Caillebotte - La Place de l'Europe, 1877. Chicago Art Institute.

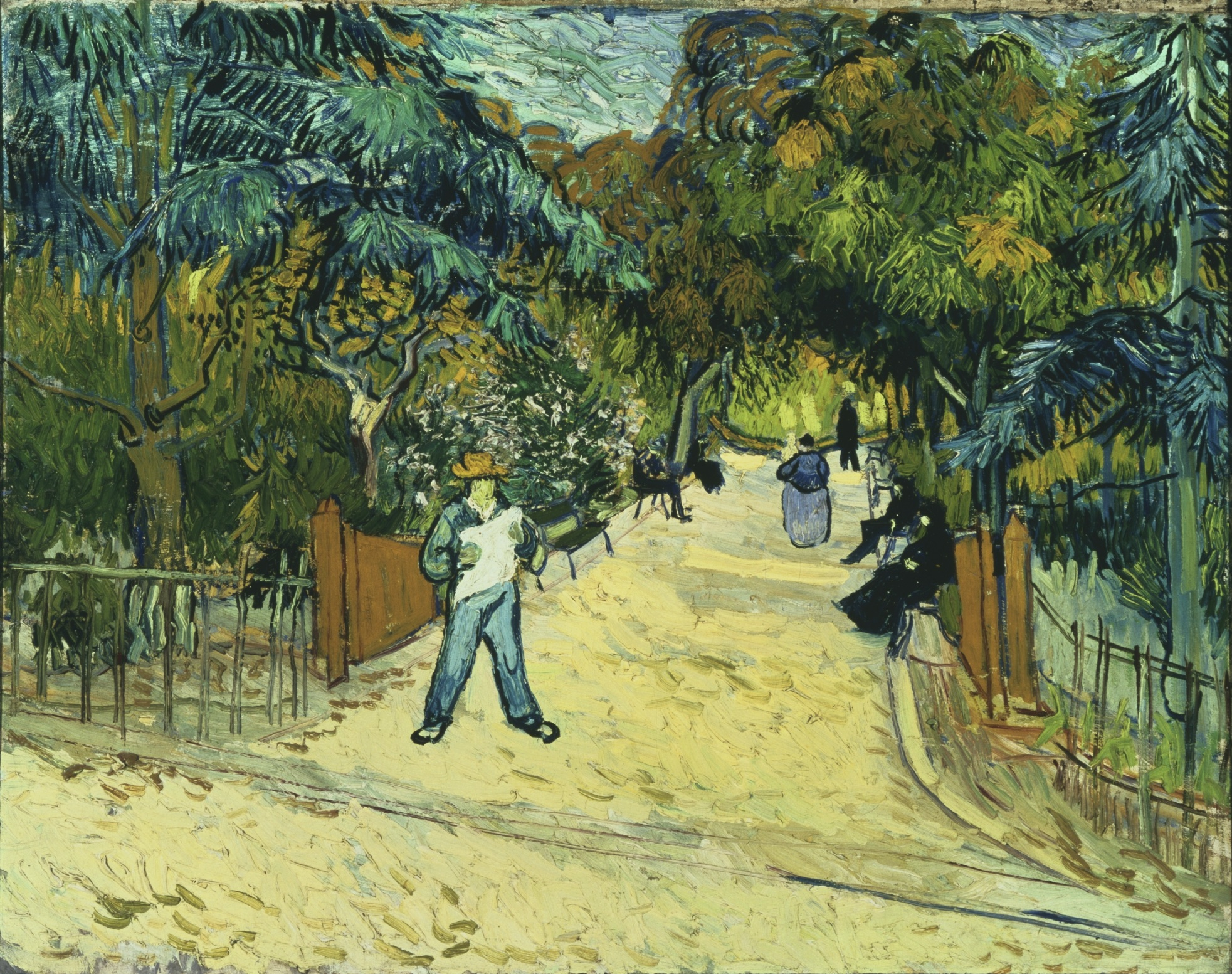
Van Gogh - Entrance to the Public Park in Arles, 1888. Phillips Collection.

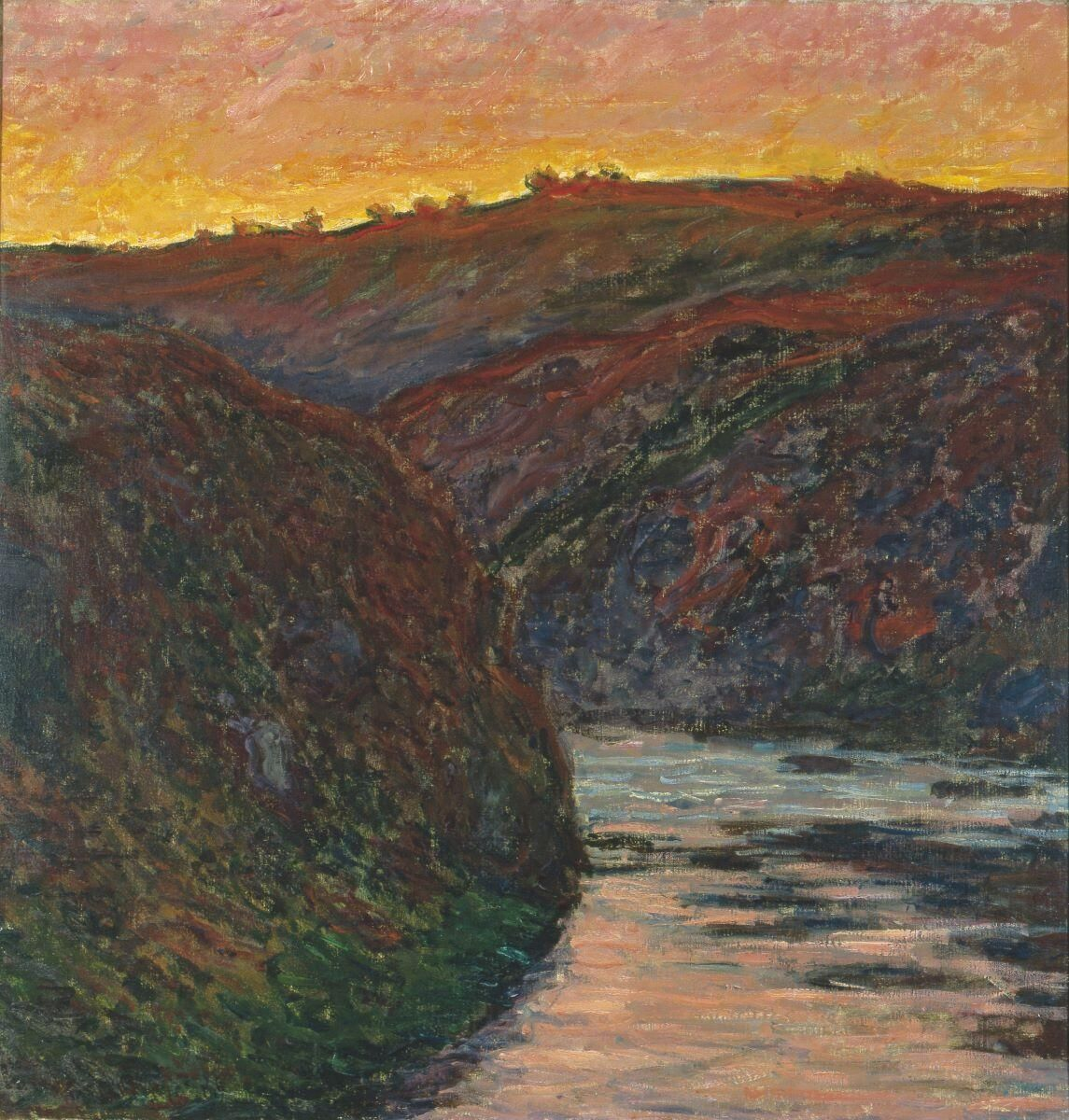
Claude Monet - The Valley of the Creuse, Sunset, 1889. Unterlinden Museum.

== Lawsuits ==
In 2011 Wildenstein & Co was the defendant in several lawsuits filed by families who said that Wildenstein held artworks that had been stolen from them. Some of the works had reportedly been stolen from Jewish families by Nazis.

In 2019 Wildenstein was sued for allegedly having sold a fake Bonnard in 1985.

== See also ==
- Wildenstein Index Number
- Sotheby's
- Christie's

== Bibliography ==
- Bardi, Pietro Maria (1992). História do MASP. Instituto Quadrante.
