= Guy Wildenstein =

French businessman

- Born: December 19, 1945 (age 80); New York City, US
- Occupations: Businessman, art dealer, racehorse owner/breeder
- Spouse: Kristina Hansson
- Children: 4
- Father: Daniel Wildenstein
- Relatives: Alec Wildenstein (brother); Georges Wildenstein (grandfather)

Guy Wildenstein (born December 19, 1945) is a French-American businessman, art dealer, and racehorse owner and breeder.

== Early life ==
Born in New York City, Guy Wildenstein is the son of Martine Julie Kapferer and Daniel Wildenstein, an art dealer, racehorse owner and breeder in France. His family fled France following the German occupation during World War II to the United States, where Guy was born. He is a member of the Assembly of French Citizens Abroad.

== Career ==
After his father's death in 2001, Guy Wildenstein assumed managing control of his art business, leaving his brother Alec to concentrate mainly on the horse racing and breeding operations. Alec died in 2008, leaving Guy in charge of both businesses. The size of his share of the family fortune and trusts, estimated from $5 billion to $10 billion, was disputed by his stepmother, Silvia Wildenstein, in 2009.

Among Wildenstein's art businesses is the Wildenstein & Company art gallery in New York City, formerly at 19 East 64th Street.

In December 2025, Wildenstein announced he had stepped down as president of Wildenstein & Co.; he was succeeded by his son David.

== Criticism ==
The BBC programme Fake or Fortune? criticized Guy Wildenstein in June 2011, after the Wildenstein Institute controversially refused to allow the painting Bords de la Seine à Argenteuil into the Monet catalogue raisonné, despite the programme submitting conclusive documentary evidence to prove its authenticity. The programme's presenter, Philip Mould, called for the Wildenstein Institute to be replaced by a committee of scholars for the purpose of adjudicating whether a painting is an original Monet or not.

In July 2011, Guy Wildenstein was charged by the French authorities with concealing art that had been reported as missing or stolen. The police seized 30 artworks from the vault of the Wildenstein Institute, at least 20 of which, including sculptures by the Italian artist Rembrandt Bugatti, two sketches by Edgar Degas and a pastel by Eugène Delacroix, were claimed to have been originally part of the collection of Joseph Reinach. Daniel Wildenstein had acted as executor of the estate of Reinach's daughter, Julie Goujon-Reinach in 1972 and had been charged with responsibility for distributing the collection, which was held at the Wildenstein Institute, among the heirs. Wildenstein was heard by a magistrate in October 2016 and denied all charges. At trial in 2017, Wildenstein was cleared of hiding paintings: the trial judge said that there was a “clear attempt” by Wildenstein and others to hide assets but it was impossible to return a guilty verdict due to shortcomings in the investigation. The prosecutors successfully appealed to the Cour de Cassation, and the case was to be rejudged.

In January 2021 it was announced that Guy Wildenstein and family members would again stand trial for tax fraud charges. They had been cleared twice previously. They were accused of concealing nearly £500 million from French authorities. In March 2024 Guy Wildenstein was found guilty of money laundering and tax fraud and sentenced to four years, with two years under house arrest and two years suspended. He was fined $1 million, had approximately $3.7 million of assets seized and was ordered to pay back taxes to the French government.

== Personal life ==
Guy Wildenstein is the grandson of the art collector Marcel Kapferer. He is married to Kristina Hasson, a Swedish former model. They have four children, son David and daughters Vanessa, Olivia, and Samantha. David manages the family's real estate assets and Vanessa manages the family's London gallery.

In 2008, he invested $49.2 million to flip five Plaza Hotel apartments and bought 7 Sutton Place for $32.5 million.
