= Julie Goujon-Reinach =

French art collector (1885–1971)

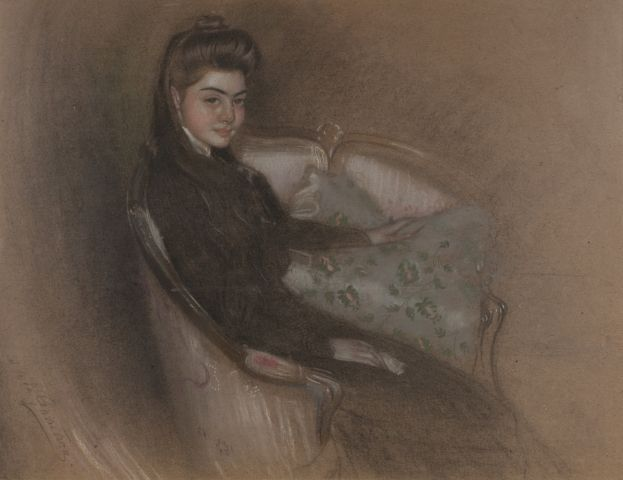
Portrait of Julie Goujon-Reinach by Antonia de La Gandara

Julie Goujon, née Reinach (1885-1971) was an art collector from the famous French Jewish Reinach family persecuted by the Nazis due to her Jewish heritage

== Life ==
Julie Reinach was born in 1885 into the illustrious French Jewish Reinach family. Her father was Joseph Reinach (1856-1921) a noted lawyer and politician who championed Dreyfus in the Dreyfus Affair. Her uncles were the archeologist Salomon Reinach (1858-1932) and the archeologist and mathematician Theodore Reinach (1860-1928)

She married Pierre Goujon and often was known as Julie Reinach-Goujon or Julie Goujon-Reinach or Madame Pierre Goujon or Lily Goujon-Reinach.

Le Jardin des Tuileries, Claude Monet, Wildenstein Nr. 402

== Art Collection ==
Reinach's father, Joseph, collected art, and after he died, the collection was inherited by his daughter, Julie Reinach Goujon, and grandson Jean-Pierre. Reinach continued to enhance the collection at her home in Saint Germain-en-Laye. Her collection contained artworks by Van Gogh, Corot, Gauguin, Manet, Degas, Rodin, Delacroix, Monet, Rembrandt and Felix Vallotton. Her husband Pierre also collected art.

== Nazi persecution and seizures ==
When Nazi Germany invaded France in 1940, the Reinach family was persecuted due to their Jewish heritage. Reinach's art collection was plundered by the Nazi looted organization known as the Einsatzstab Reichsleiter Rosenberg ERR. In some sources, the Nazi looted art is listed under her father's, name.

Reinach's cousin Julien Reinach (1892-1962) survived deportation to Drancy and Bergen-Belsen but Léon Reinach (1893-1944) and his wife Béatrice de Camondo (Béatrice Reinach) were murdered at Auschwitz along with their children Fanny (1920-1943) and Bertrand (1923-1943).

== Postwar claims for restitution ==
Reinach's great-great nephew Alexandre Bronstein searched for the artworks stolen from her collection by Nazis in 1941 On September 28, 2011, after a long investigation he wrote to the culture minister Frederic Mitterrand demanding the restitution of a painting by Henri Gervex

== Lawsuits against Wildenstein ==
In 2011, Reinach family member Alexander Bronstein filed a lawsuit against the Wildenstein art dealing family after French antifraud investigator discovered a painting belonging to them among a stash of artworks in Wildenstein vault. According to Artinfo, Bronstein "filed a criminal lawsuit inquiry claiming that Daniel Wildenstein, Guy's father, kept inaccurate inventories of the estate so that it would remain unclear which work was looted by Nazis, and which was looted by the Wildensteins."

== Legacy ==
Goujon-Reinach's art collection has undergone several phases of dispersal. Some artwork looted by the Nazis during her lifetime have not been recovered and their whereabouts are still unknown. Some artworks from her collection were rediscovered after her death in the vaults of the Wildenstein Institute in 2011 A major auction of artworks from her collection took place on November 20, 2020. Individual works that passed through her collection continue to enrich museums and private collections. A Monet (Le Jardin des Tuileries) that Goujon-Reinach once owned will be auctioned at Sotheby's Blaquier-Arrietta sale in November 2026 with an estimated price of "$15 million to $20 million".

== See also ==
The Reinach Family

Béatrice de Camondo

The Holocaust in France

Hector Feliciano

Wildenstein Institute
