= Le Chemin, Paysage à Meudon =

Painting by Albert Gleizes

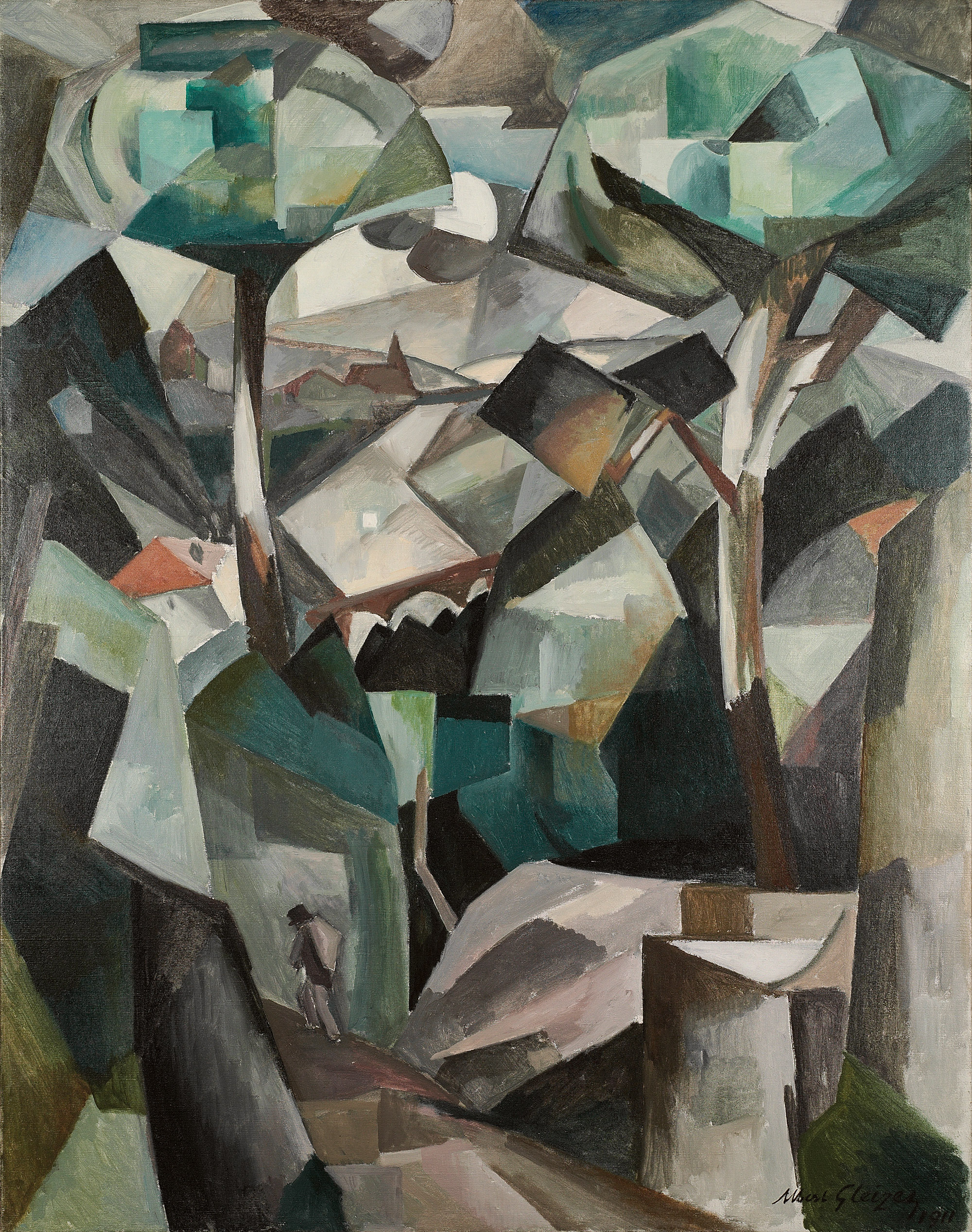
- Artist: Albert Gleizes
- Year: 1911
- Medium: Oil on canvas
- Dimensions: 146.4 cm × 114.4 cm (57.6 in × 45 in)
- Location: Private collection

Le Chemin, Paysage à Meudon, also known as Paysage avec personage, is an oil on canvas painted in 1911 by the artist, theorist and writer Albert Gleizes. The work was exhibited at the Salon des Indépendants during the spring of 1911, Paris; Les Indépendants, Musée moderne de Bruxelles, 1911; Galeries Dalmau, Exposicio d'art cubista, Barcelona, 1912; Galerie La Boétie, Salon de La Section d'Or, 1912. The painting was reproduced in the journal Le Siècle (1912) in an article titled Enquête sur le Cubisme, by Olivier Hourcade.

Le Chemin was identified by Hector Feliciano as having been plundered by the Nazis from the home of collector Alphonse Kann during World War II. It was returned to the heirs of Alphonse Kann in July 1997 and placed at public auctions in New York (1999) and London (2010) respectively.

== Description ==
Le Chemin, Paysage à Meudon is an oil painting on canvas with dimensions 146.4 cm × 114.4 cm (57.6 in × 45.0 in), signed and dated 'Albert Gleizes 1911' (lower right); signed again and titled 'Alb Gleizes Paysage' (on the reverse). This work, painted at the outset of 1911, represents a human figure walking through a hilly landscape with trees, houses or villas, a bridge over the Seine river, and a town with a church (possibly the Paroisse de Saint-Cloud) on the 'horizon', consistent with elements of the town in the southwestern suburbs of Paris, Meudon.

The term 'Cubism' was employed for the first time in June 1911 by Guillaume Apollinaire, speaking in the context of the Indépendants exhibition in Brussels which included this work by Gleizes, along with others by Robert Delaunay, Fernand Léger, and Henri Le Fauconnier. During the summer, Gleizes was in close contact with Jean Metzinger, who had recently moved to Meudon. Gleizes too lived and worked in the western suburbs of Paris (la banlieue ouest), 24 Avenue Gambetta, Courbevoie. The Gleizes' family moved to Avenue Gambetta in 1887. Both artists were discontent with the conventional perspective mechanism. They had long conversations about the nature of form and perception. They agreed that traditional painting gave a static and incomplete idea of the subject as experienced in life. Things, they would conclude, are in fact dynamic, observed to move, are seen from different angles and can be captured at successive moments in time.

== Cubism ==
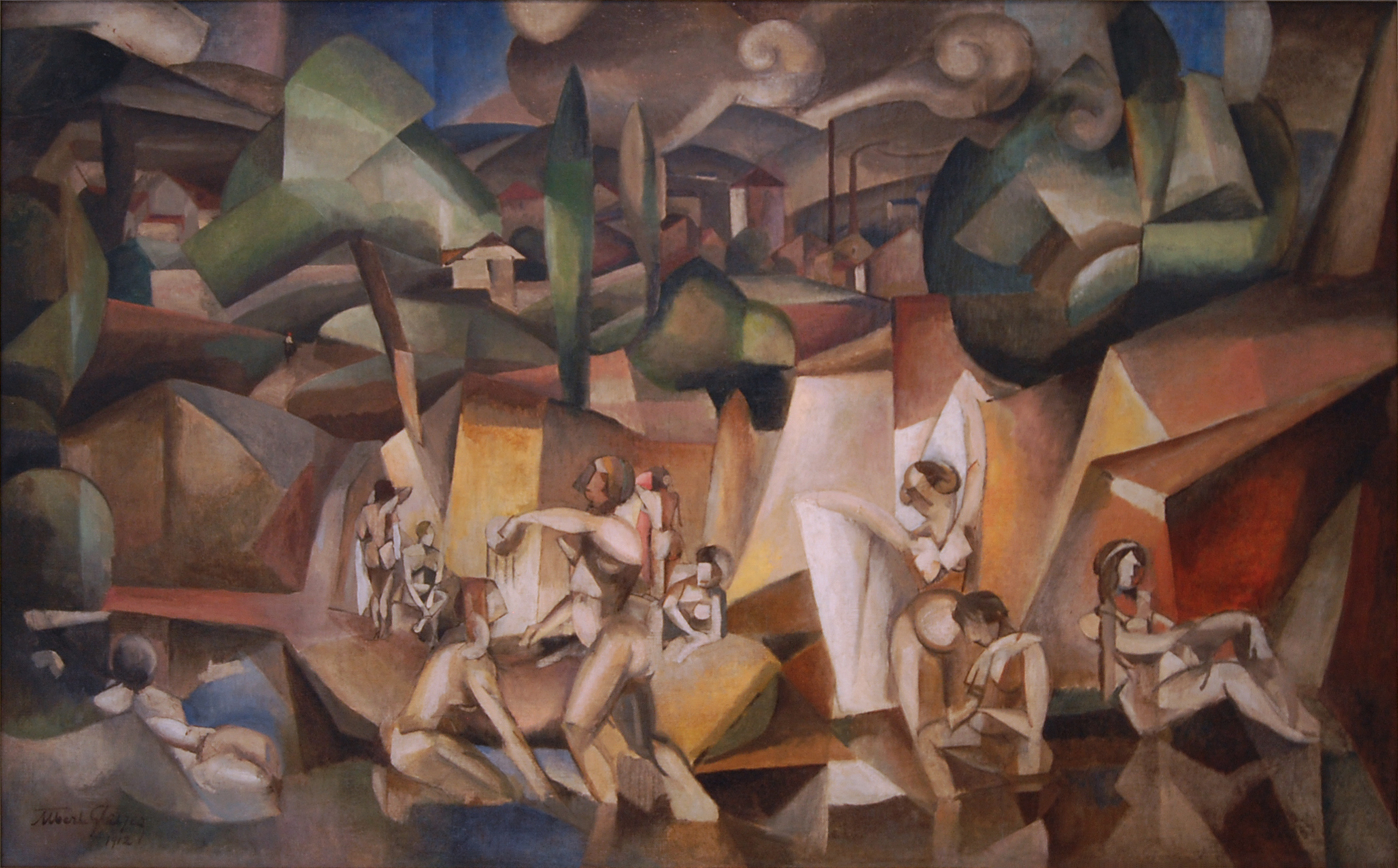
Albert Gleizes, 1912, Les Baigneuses (The Bathers), oil on canvas, 105 x 171 cm, Musée d'Art Moderne de la Ville de Paris

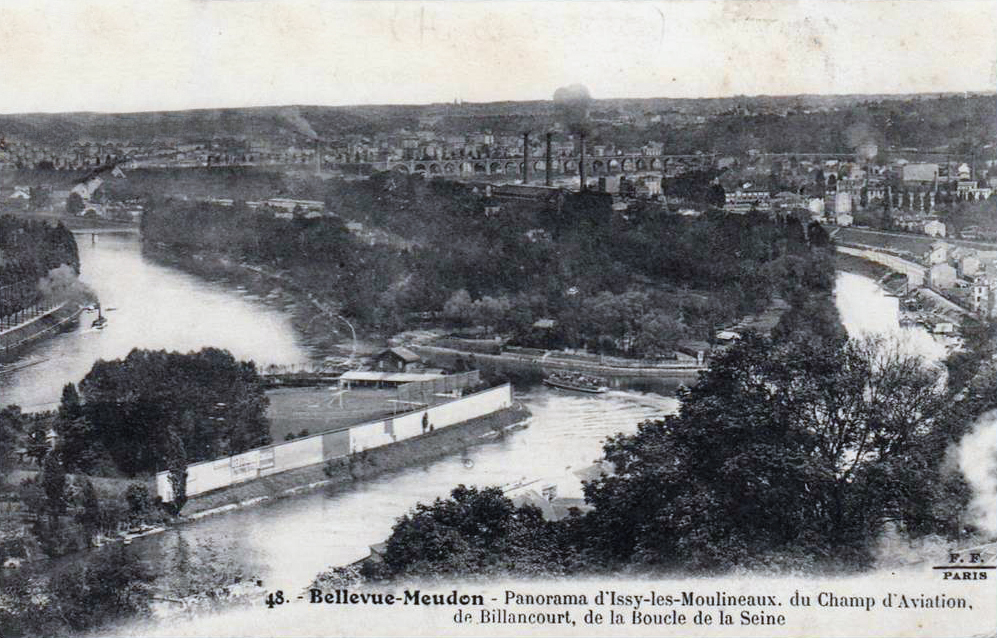
Bellevue-Meudon, Panorama of Issy-les-Moulineaux, the Champ d'Aviation de Billancourt, and the Boucle de la Seine

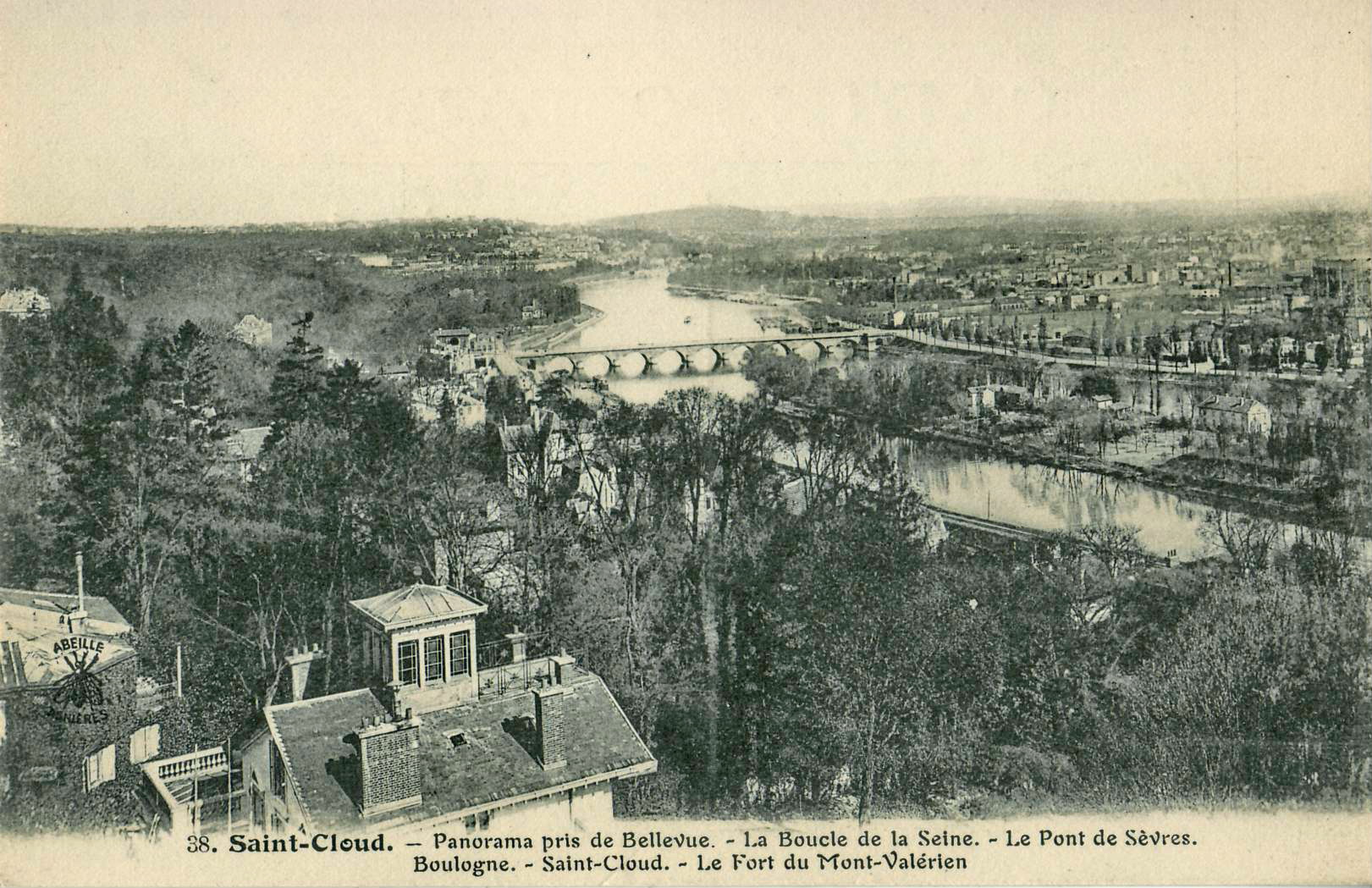
Saint-Cloud, Panorama viewed from Bellevue, La Boucle de la Seine, Le Pont de Sèvres, Boulogne, Saint-Cloud, Le Fort du Mont-Valérien

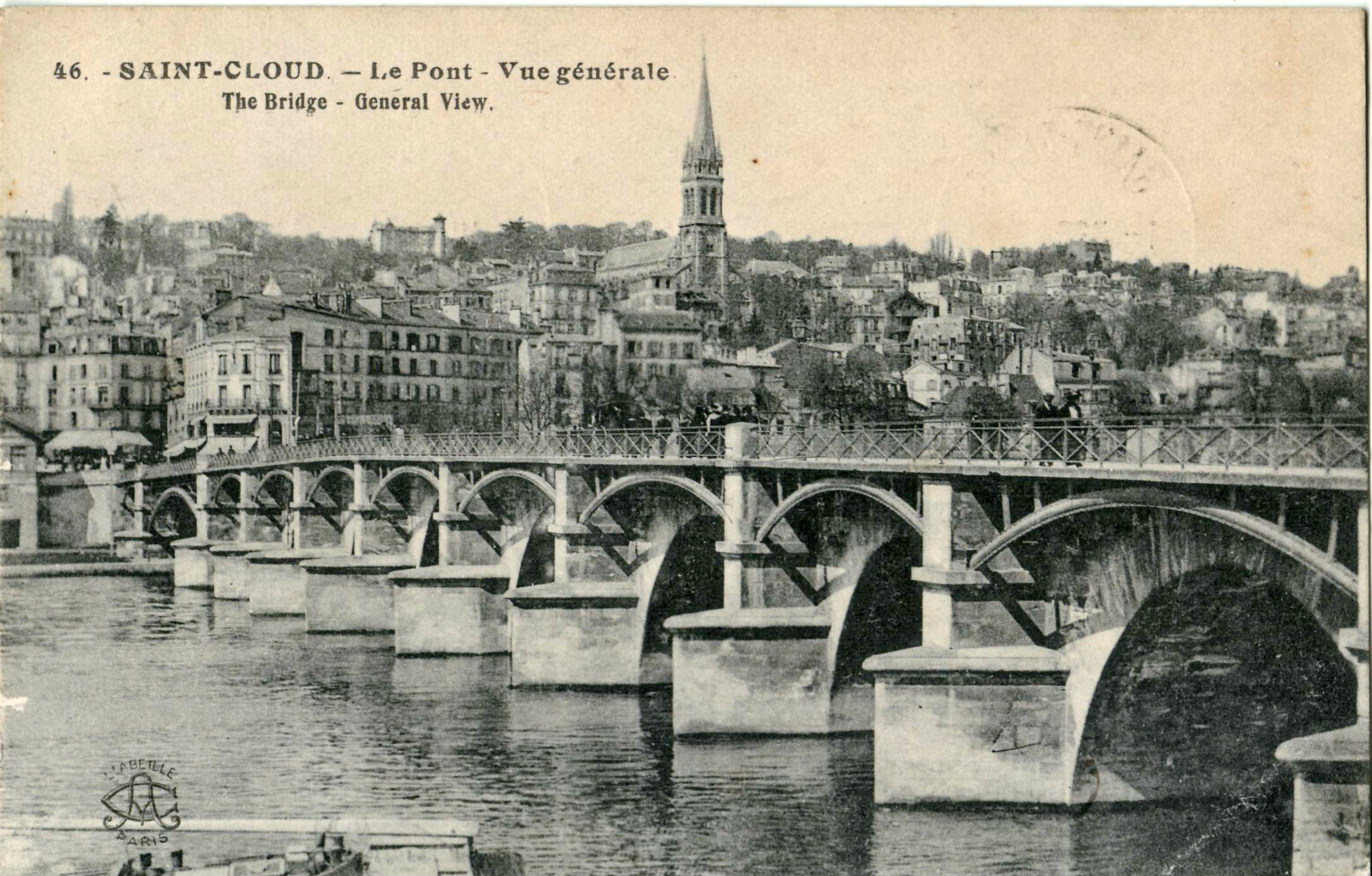
Saint-Cloud, Le Pont, Vue générale

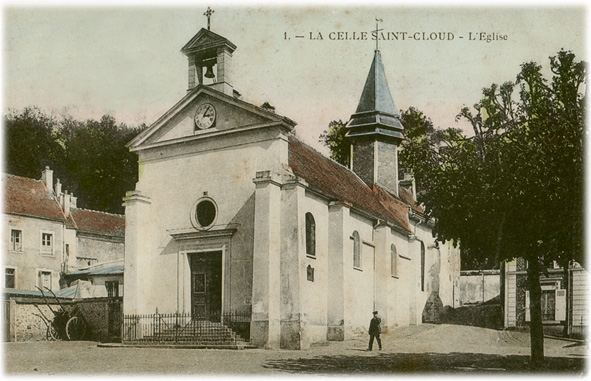
Paroisse de Saint-Cloud, circa 1910

Paysage à Meudon, Gleizes' largest painting to date, is the principal product of "rodage" (French: rodage, a 'grinding together', a term Gleizes himself used with Jean Metzinger}. In his Cubism in the Shadow of War: The Avant-Garde and Politics in Paris, 1905–1914, art historian David Cottington writes of Paysage à Meudon:

The classical armature and Claudian image of Gleizes' picture are both overlaid with a pattern of planes and facets that fragments forms, combines perspectives and complicates the relation between spaces and volumes, but does little to disrupt the conventional spatial recession.

Just as in the works of Metzinger, and unlike those of Pablo Picasso or Georges Braque of the same period, Gleizes had no interest in the flattening of the entire surface, of fusing background and foreground to the point where all spatial depth of field was abandoned. Gleizes made use of fragmentation of form, multiple perspective views (i.e., mobile and dynamic, rather than static and from one point-of-view) along with linear and planar structural qualities. Gleizes' Les Baigneuses (The Bathers) of the following year employs the same concept of multiple perspective, but not at the expense of vacating spatial depth. Though highly sophisticated in theory, this aspect of simultaneity would actually become quite commonly employed within the practices of the Section d'Or group. Gleizes deployed these techniques in "a radical, personal and coherent manner", according to Cottington.

In his catalogue preface for the 1911 Indépendants de Bruxelles, Guillaume Apollinaire wrote of this painting, titled Le chemin:

Il est sorti un art simple et noble, expressif et mesuré, ardent à la recherche de la beauté et tout prêt à aborder ces vastes sujets que les peintre d'hier n'osaient entreprendre.

Gleizes' Proto-Cubist work entitled L'Arbre (The Tree) exhibited at the 1910 Salon des Indépendants in Paris was the point of departure for Paysage à Meudon. Visibly distant from the work of Picasso or Braque, Paysage à Meudon is stylistically much closer to Metzinger, Le Fauconnier, Léger and Delaunay. Gleizes' interpretation of space in a succession of plans and simple geometric lines descends directly from the teachings of Paul Cézanne. These same aesthetic preoccupations would unite several artists that formed a group and held meetings in Puteaux, at the Duchamp residence. For their first public manifestation as a group—the Salon de la Section d'Or of 1912—Gleizes chose to present this 1911 landscape (no. 39 of the catalogue), along with Les Baigneuses and the monumental Le Dépiquage des Moissons (Harvest Threshing), both of 1912.

In their Lot Notes for the 1999 sale, Christie's writes:

In 1911, Albert Gleizes was at the height of his artistic powers and Paysage à Meudon is one of the artist's most celebrated paintings. [...] In the present work, Gleizes retained a traditional sense of perspective and employed the use of a vanishing point in the road and the houses in the background. There is a logical diminution of form, and in this respect Gleizes' Cubism retained his singular vision of imposing a sense of weight and volumetric relationships to his subjects.

In their Lot Notes for the 2010 sale, Christie's writes:

Le Chemin (Meudon) is a large and important painting made by Albert Gleizes in the summer of 1911 (Note: This mention of the timing of the painting's creation in Christie's "lot essay" appears to be an error. The Salon des Indépendants at which Le Chemin (Meudon) had been exhibited was held from 21 April to 13 June in the spring of 1911; so Gleizes' painting could not possibly have been made "in the summer of 1911" as stated in the Christie's catalogue notes.) at the height of his new friendship and collaboration with fellow Cubist Jean Metzinger. One of his largest and most ambitious paintings from this period, made in direct response to the inspiration of Metzinger, it was exhibited by Gleizes at the groundbreaking exhibition of the so-called 'Salon Cubists', Robert Delaunay, Fernand Léger, Henri Le Fauconnier and Gleizes, at the Salon des Indépendants in June 1911.

With its prismatic Cubism, shifting multiple perspective points and its holistic integration of landscape and figure centred around this lone figures journey through a path in the woods and through the heart of the picture, this work represents a radical extension of Gleizes' Cubism into an entirely new integrated and simultaneous style of composition.

== History ==
Alphonse Kann had been admired for his extraordinary taste and keen eye. Before the war his collection included at least thirty-five paintings by Picasso, in addition to many others by artists such as Braque, Klee, Matisse, Manet, Courbet, Renoir. Paysage à Meudon was among approximately 130 works that had been looted from the Kann collection by the German Occupation Army in 1940. The National Museums of Recuperations recovered Paysage à Meudon in 1949 and it subsequently went into the collection of the Musée National d'Art Moderne, Paris. On 11 July 1997 the Musée National d'Art Moderne returned Gleizes' Paysage à Meudon, stolen by Nazi occupiers during the Second World War, to the heirs of the art collector Alphonse Kann.

Didier Schulman, a curator at the Centre Georges Pompidou, confirmed the return of the painting to Francois Warin, grand-nephew of Alphonse Kann. The Gleizes painting was one of 2,000 objects returned to France from Germany after the war. If a work remained unclaimed, they were temporarily entrusted to museums. These artworks are known as National Museum Recovery (NMR). Francois Warin learned of the Gleizes painting from a book written in 1997 by the journalist Hector Feliciano, The Lost Museum, which traces the fate of many works confiscated by the Nazis.

Feliciano found Gleizes' Landscape while researching his book. The painting was listed in documents of the Einsatzstab Reichsleiter Rosenberg (ERR), a Nazi government branch that supervised the confiscation of artworks in France. Feliciano said that after plundering the painting, the Nazis brought it to the Galerie nationale du Jeu de Paume in Paris where confiscated artworks were deposited.

"For the Germans it was degenerate art so they bartered it or sold it for the type of paintings they liked," said Feliciano. Because the Nazis considered Cubism, Futurism and Impressionism "degenerate", German art dealers were able to inexpensively acquire them or exchange them for less valuable works that the Nazis coveted.

France's Cour des Comptes, a state spending 'watchdog' charged with conducting financial and legislative audits of public and private institutions, accused the museums of failing in their legal duty to seek out the owners or heirs of the works, including paintings by Pablo Picasso, Pierre-Auguste Renoir, Claude Monet, Paul Cézanne and sculptures by Auguste Rodin. In an attempt to rebut the charges, French authorities put 900 of the MNRs on exhibit in five national museums, including The Louvre and the Pompidou Centre. Gleizes' Paysage à Meudon was among them. The state-museum network explained that few or none of the works in its possession were looted from Jews, but were sold to the Nazis by collaborationist dealers in the wartime Parisian art market. However, works such as the Gleizes, were indeed seized from Jews deported to death camps or fleeing persecution, or sold under duress at rock-bottom prices.

Feliciano accused state museums of doing nothing to try to return the MNRs to their owners. Warin had to wait a year to recover the work after his original claim, even though documents listing the Gleizes were in France's Foreign Ministry archives.

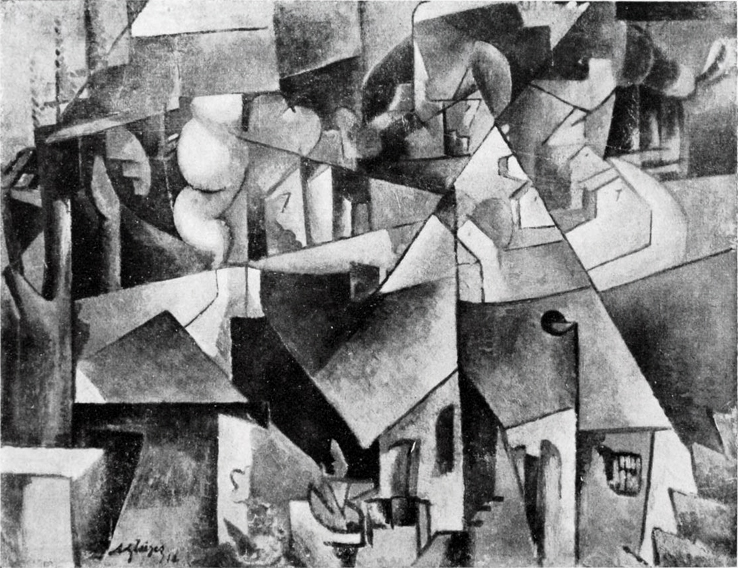
Albert Gleizes, 1912, Landschaft bei Paris, Paysage près de paris, Paysage de Courbevoie, oil on canvas, 72.8 x 87.1 cm, missing from Hannover since 1937. Provenance: Küppers, Leihgabe im Landesmuseum Hannover, Beschlagnahme 1937, Gal. Buchholz Berlin.

"This is proof the museums haven't done their job for 50 years," Feliciano said. "They had these documents in their hands."

== Paysage près de Paris ==
Le Chemin was not the only work by Gleizes to be looted by the Nazis: Paysage près de Paris, also referred to as Landschaft bei Paris and Paysage de Courbevoie, 1912, an oil on canvas of dimensions 72.8 x 87.1 cm, has been missing from Hannover since 1937. This work is listed in the Lost Art Internet Database. Formerly in the collection of Dr. Paul Erich Küppers, Hannover, Germany (the first director Kestner society art gallery), the painting was confiscated by the German Ministry of Public Enlightenment and Propaganda (Reichsministerium für Volksaufklärung und Propaganda, RMVP or Propagandaministerium) in Hannover (1937) from Leihgabe im Landesmuseum Hannover, Beschlagnahme 1937, Gal. Buchholz Berlin, and has been missing ever since.

== See also ==
- List of works by Albert Gleizes

== Provenance ==
- Alphonse Kann, Saint-Germain-en-Laye, from whom confiscated by the National Socialists in 1940.
- Deposited with the Musée national d'Art moderne, Paris, by L'Office des biens privés (Office of Private Properties; inv. no. RIP) in 1949.
- Restituted to the heirs of Alphonse Kann in July 1997.
- Christie's, New York, Rockefeller Plaza, Sale 9224, 20th Century Art (Evening Sale) Lot 516, 9 November 1999. Price realized: $827,500
- Christie's, London, King Street, Sale 7857, Impressionist/Modern Evening Sales, Lot 38, 23 June 2010. Price realized: $2,683,878, or 2,198,983 Euros (a public auction record for a work by Albert Gleizes)

== Literature ==
- J. Golding, Cubism, London, 1959, p. 150.
- B. Dorival, The School of Paris in the Musée d'Art Moderne, New York, 1962, p. 148 (illustrated). *P. Alibert, Albert Gleizes, naissance et avenir du cubisme, Saint-Etienne, 1982, pp. 13, 40 and 70 (illustrated).
- A. de la Beaumelle and N. Pouillon, eds., La collection du Musée National d'Art Moderne, Paris, 1986, p. 247 and 248 (illustrated in color, p. 247).
- H. Feliciano, The Lost Museum: The Nazi Conspiracy to Steal the World's Greatest Works of Art, New York, 1997, p. 225 (illustrated, p. C15).
- A. Varichon, Albert Gleizes: Catalogue raisonné, Paris, 1998, vol. I, p. 135, no. 369 (illustrated in color).
- D. Cottington, Cubism in the Shadow of the War - the avant-garde and politics in Paris, 1905–1914, New Haven & London, 1998, p. 112 (illustrated).

== Exhibited ==
- Salon des Indépendants, Paris, Quai d'Orsay, April - June 1911, no. 2613 (as Le chemin).
- Indépendants de Bruxelles, VIII Salon annuel du Cercle d'art Les Indépendants, Musée moderne de Bruxelles, 10 June - 3 July 1911, Place A. Stews, Delaunay, Gleizes, Léger, Le Fauconnier, no. 88 (as Le chemin).
- Galeries J. Dalmau, Exposicio d'art cubista, Barcelona, 20 April–10 May 1912, no. 16.
- Salon de La Section d'Or, Paris, Galerie La Boétie, October 1912, no. 39. *City Art Gallery, Autour du cubisme, London, Tate Gallery, and Birmingham, July–September 1956, no. 7.
- Institute of Contemporary Art, Paintings from the Musée national d'Art moderne, October 1957 - April 1958, no. 17 (illustrated); this exhibition later travelled to Columbus, Ohio, Gallery of Fine Arts; Pittsburg, Carnegie Institute and Minneapolis, Walker Art Center.
- The Solomon R. Guggenheim Museum, New York, Albert Gleizes, 1881–1953, A Retrospective Exhibition, September - October 1964, no. 23 (illustrated); this exhibition later travelled to Paris, Musée national d'Art moderne, December 1964 - January 1965, no. 9 and Dortmund, Museum am Ostwall, March - April 1965, no. 9 (titled 'Paysage, Meudon').
- Hall d'exposition, L'Abbaye Créteil, Créteil, October 1971, no. 35.
- Palazzo Reale, Boccioni e il suo tempo, Milan, December 1973-February 1974, no. 147 (illustrated).
- Atelier Paul Cézanne, Pages Cézanniennes: Albert Gleizes, Aix-en-Provence, August–October 1986.
- National Gallery of Scotland, Monet to Matisse: Landscape in France, 1874–1914, Edinburgh, August–October 1994, pp. 37, 161, and 191, nos. 124 and 252 (illustrated in color, p. 84; detail illustrated in color, p. 160).
- Museu Picasso, Albert Gleizes: El cubisme en majestat, Barcelona, March–August 2001, no. 31; this exhibition later travelled to Lyon, Musée des Beaux-Arts, September - December 2001 (illustrated p. 44, titled 'Le Chemin, Meudon').
