= Daniel Wildenstein =

French art dealer and historian

- Born: Daniel Leopold Wildenstein; 11 September 1917; Paris, France
- Died: 23 October 2001 (aged 84); Paris, France
- Occupations: art dealer, racehorse owner and breeder
- Known for: Owner of Wildenstein & Co.
- Spouses: Martine Kapferer (m. 1939, divorced) Sylvia Roth (m. 1978)
- Children: 2 sons Alec and Guy
- Father: Georges Wildenstein

Daniel Leopold Wildenstein (11 September 1917 – 23 October 2001) was a French art dealer, historian and owner-breeder of thoroughbred and standardbred race horses. He was the third member of the family to preside over Wildenstein & Co., one of the most successful and influential art-dealerships of the 20th century. He was once described as "probably the richest and most powerful art dealer on earth."

== Early life and education ==
Wildenstein was born in Verrières-le-Buisson, Essonne to Jeanne "Jane" (née Lévy) and Georges Wildenstein. He was educated at Cours Hattemer and at the University of Paris, graduating in 1938 and going on to study at the École du Louvre.

== Family art business ==
Wildenstein's grandfather, Nathan Wildenstein, established an art dealership on the Rue La Boétie in Paris after fleeing his native Alsace during the Franco-Prussian War of 1870/71. He first specialised in 18th-century French painting and sculpture, later expanding to Italian, Dutch, Flemish and Spanish art. Although he had been working in a tailor's shop when he began to trade in art he proved extremely successful, selling to European collectors such as Edmond James de Rothschild and later to Americans such as J. P. Morgan, Henry Clay Frick, and to the Kress, Rockefeller, and Mellon families. He opened a New York gallery in 1903 and one in London in 1925.

The Wildensteins gained a reputation as shrewd businessmen, stockpiling works to maximise their profits when released onto the market. Nathan built a huge inventory of European Old Master paintings, sculpture, drawings, furniture and decorative objects, to which Daniel's father, Georges, added Impressionist and Postimpressionist works. In 1978 Wildenstein & Co's New York storeroom included 20 pictures by Renoir, 25 Courbets, 10 Van Goghs, 10 Cézannes, 10 Gauguins, 2 Botticellis, 8 Rembrandts, 8 Rubens, 9 El Grecos and 5 Tintorettos among a total inventory of 10,000 paintings. The secrecy attached to these holdings led to a great deal of interest and speculation in the art world.

== Career and publications ==
In 1940 Daniel Wildenstein went to New York to work for the family firm. He had already acted as Group Secretary of the French Pavilion at the World's Fair in 1937 and as exhibitions director at the Chaalis museum and its related Jacquemart-Andre Museum. He took over the running of Wildenstein & Co.'s Paris and New York branches in 1959 and those in London and Buenos Aires in 1963, the year his father died. A gallery in Tokyo was added in the early 1970s. As an art dealer Wildenstein was phenomenally successful. A 1998 profile of the family in Vanity Fair magazine asserted that his wealth was estimated at more than $5 billion. "His fortune," the magazine stated, "was the only one of that magnitude ever made in the art market."

Like his father, Daniel Wildenstein established a reputation as a scholar and art historian. He revised and enlarged the catalogues published by his father and began work on his own projects, investing in the acquisition of archival material and establishing the Wildenstein Institute to issue catalogues raisonné which became the authority for authenticating the works of major French artists. His five-volume catalogue raisonné of the work of Claude Monet was published between 1976 and 1992. His two-volumes on Édouard Manet appeared in 1976 and 1977, those on Gustave Courbet in 1977 and 1977, and a book on Paul Gauguin in 2001. He acted as editor-in-chief of the Gazette des Beaux-Arts from 1963 and in 1971 was elected a member of the Académie des Beaux-Arts.

Although he officially retired in 1990, Wildenstein is reported to have maintained a close control over the running of the business. The number of Wildenstein galleries around the world shrank in his later years until it contained only two: Wildenstein & Co. and PaceWildenstein, both in New York. PaceWildenstein was established in 1993 as a joint venture with the Pace Gallery to deal in contemporary art. The collaboration came to an end in 2010.

In 1999 Wildenstein published a series of his interviews entitled Marchand d’Art.

== Controversies ==
=== Andre Malraux ===
Wildenstein & Co reopened in Paris after the Second World War but ended its operations there in the early 1960s after the French minister of culture, Andre Malraux, publicly accused Georges Wildenstein of bribing a ministry official to authorize the export and sale abroad of Georges de La Tour's painting The Fortune Teller. The case never went to court and Daniel Wildenstein subsequently accused Malraux of being motivated by malice.

=== Nazi confiscations ===
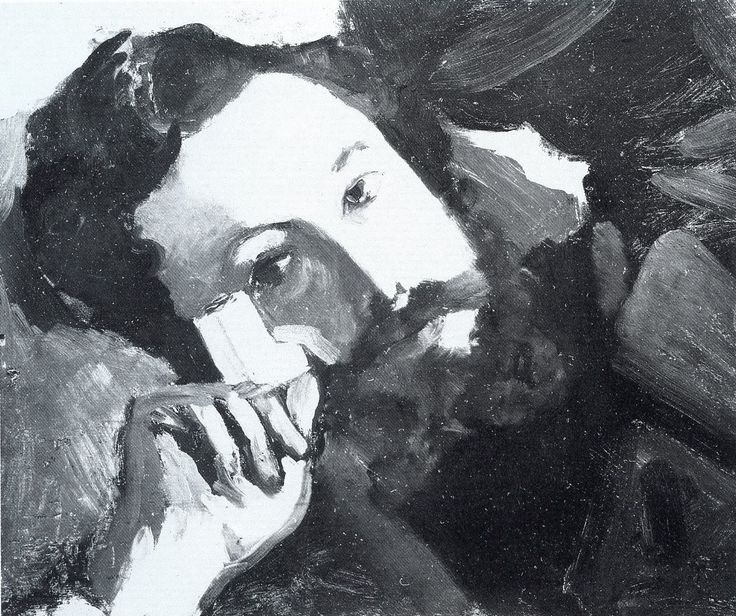
Portrait of Alfred Sisley, 1867-68, by Frédéric Bazille, Wildenstein Galleries, Paris, destroyed during World War II.

More recently Wildenstein & Co became embroiled in controversies connected with the Nazi confiscation of art works during the Second World War, and with the nature of Georges Wildenstein's relationship with the German regime at that time. In May 2000 the Wildensteins lost a court case they had brought in Paris against the art historian Héctor Feliciano, whose book, The Lost Museum: The Nazi Conspiracy to Steal the World's Greatest Works of Art, suggested that although Georges Wildenstein had fled France for America in 1941, the business had continued to trade profitably with the Nazis. Daniel Wildenstein's sons sued for defamation but lost the case.

In 1997 the Wildenstein family was sued in New York by the heirs of Alphonse Kann, a prominent Jewish art collector. They claimed that eight illuminated manuscripts, dating from the 15th, 16th and 17th centuries and now in the possession of Wildenstein & Co, had been looted by the Nazis in 1940. The Wildensteins asserted that the books were owned legitimately before the war, that they had been seized from their family safe in October 1940, and that they had then been recovered after the liberation of France. Daniel Wildenstein suggested that inventory markings on the manuscripts apparently connecting them to the Kann collection were of no significance and suggested that claims to ownership made after so long an interval of time had no validity.

=== Reinach estate ===
In June 2011 Daniel's son, Guy Wildenstein, was charged by the French authorities with concealing art that had been reported as missing or stolen. The police seized 30 artworks from the vault of the Wildenstein Institute, at least 20 of which, including sculptures by the Italian artist Rembrandt Bugatti, two sketches by Edgar Degas and a pastel by Eugène Delacroix, were claimed to have been originally part of the collection of Joseph Reinach. Daniel Wildenstein had acted as executor of the estate of Reinach's daughter, Julie Gougon-Reinach, in 1972 and had been charged with responsibility for distributing the collection, which was held at the Wildenstein Institute, among the heirs.

== Thoroughbred horse racing ==
Daniel Wildenstein's racing silks

Wildenstein was a major figure in European horse racing, a four-time winner of the Prix de l'Arc de Triomphe and six times France's leading owner. His horses, many of which he bred, raced under the name of the Allez France Stables and captured many of the most important races in France, the United Kingdom and the United States. His first win in the Arc came with the filly Allez France in 1974. He won again with All Along in 1983, with Sagace the following year and with the colt Peintre Celebre, who broke the course record when winning in 1997. The homebred filly All Along was named horse of the year in France and across the Atlantic, after a series of wins in America followed her victory in the Arc. Among Wildenstein's other successful horses were Pawneese, Madelia, and Flying Water.

Wildenstein was a famously irascible owner. His criticism of Pat Eddery's riding of Buckskin in the Ascot Gold Cup of 1978 caused the trainer Peter Walwyn to ask Wildenstein to remove his horses from his yard. They were removed to the care of Henry Cecil, forming a partnership that had considerable success in the late 1970s and early 1980s, only for that relationship to break down in 1985 over criticism of Cecil's then stable-jockey Lester Piggott. Piggott responded by describing the Wildensteins as "inveterate bad losers".

== Personal life ==
In 1939, Daniel Wildenstein married Martine Julie Kapferer, the daughter of Marcel Kapferer, a wealthy French Jewish art collector and CEO; they had two sons, Alec and Guy Wildenstein. The marriage was dissolved, and he subsequently married Sylvia Roth in 1978, whom he had first met in 1964.

== Death and inheritance ==
Wildenstein fell into a coma and died of cancer in 2001 at the age of 84 in a Paris hospital. He was survived by his second wife and his two sons from a first marriage. Guy Wildenstein assumed responsibility for the art dealership while Alec Wildenstein inherited control of the family's horse racing and breeding operations.

After his death, Wildenstein's fortune became the subject of an extended legal dispute. In 2005 the Court of Appeal in Paris ruled that his widow Sylvia Wildenstein had been deceived into signing away her inheritance by her stepsons, who claimed that she would otherwise face huge tax bills and a possible criminal investigation. In fact Wildenstein had placed two paintings, a Fragonard and a Boucher, with the investment bank Lazard Frères to cover his estate's tax liabilities. The court ruled that Sylvia Wildenstein was entitled to half of her late husband's personal estate, much of which she claimed had disappeared into foreign trusts, and ordered her stepsons to pay 20 million euros as an advance on a fortune described by The New York Times as having been "variously estimated from 43 million to 4 billion euros". In 2010 Sylvia Wildenstein pursued a criminal case alleging that this tax evasion had been ignored by French ministers connected to her stepson Guy Wildenstein through his involvement with the political party the UMP. Roth died in 2010, but the state pursued a criminal charges. The family was acquitted in 2017 and in 2018 in tax fraud and money-laundering cases brought by the government. In 2021, "France's attorney general and tax authorities brought concerns about the decision to acquit" to the Court of Cassation, with a trial pending in late 2023.

In 2022, the IRS assessed taxes and penalties on the estate of Daniel Wildenstein's US "tangible assets" in a settlement reported at $17 million.

== See also ==
- Wildenstein Index Number
