= Jean Adhémar =

French librarian, curator, and academic (born 1908)

- Born: Jean Henri Jacques Adhémar; 18 March 1908; Paris, 17th arrondissement, France
- Died: 30 June 1987 (aged 79); Paris, 16th arrondissement, France
- Education: École Nationale des Chartes, 1928–1932; University of Paris Faculty of Humanities
- Occupations: Art historian; curator; archivist; academic.
- Employer: Bibliothèque nationale de France
- Organizations: Comité national de l'estampe, 1961–1978; Société de l'École des chartes; Société de l'histoire de Paris et de l'Île-de-France, 1928–1987; Société des Antiquaires de France, 1954–1987
- Spouse: Hélène Adhémar
- Awards: Commander of the Legion of Honour; Commander of the National Order of Merit, 1967; Commander of the French Order of Academic Palms; Officer of the Order of Leopold II

Jean Henri Jacques Adhémar (1908–1987) was a French art historian, curator, archivist and academic.

== Early life and education ==
Jean Henri Jacques Adhémar was born on 18 March 1908 in the 17th arrondissement of Paris.

In 1928 Adhémar entered the École Nationale des Chartes. A pupil of Marcel Aubert, Adhémar graduated in 1932 with a Diplôme d'archiviste-paléographe. Adhémar studied literature at the then University of Paris Faculty of Humanities, graduating with a Doctorate ès Lettre in 1938. Adhémar's doctoral advisor was Henri Focillon.

== Career ==
Adhémar was a curator in the print department ("Cabinet Des Estampes") at the Bibliothèque Nationale de France from 1932 to 1961, and headed the department from 1961 until 1972. He introduced photography to the Bibliothèque.

As a young scholar, Adhémar was an affiliate of the Warburg Institute in London. He introduced France to the ideas and methods of Erwin Panofsky, Meyer Schapiro, and Edgar Wind by broadening its analysis and research to widen the field of human mentality history. He published articles, books, and catalogues, and was considered one of the world's foremost experts on prints (with a predilection for the 19th century).

Adhémar was the editor of the Gazette des Beaux-Arts until his death, and was the founder, in 1963, of the Nouvelles de l'Estampe, a scholarly journal on prints. Adhémar was a professor at the École du Louvre and at the Université libre de Bruxelles.

== Personal life ==
Adhémar was the husband of Hélène Adhémar (1910–1998), an art historian and curator at the Louvre, Jeu de Paume and Musée de l'Orangerie.
