= Gazette des Beaux-Arts =

Defunct French art review

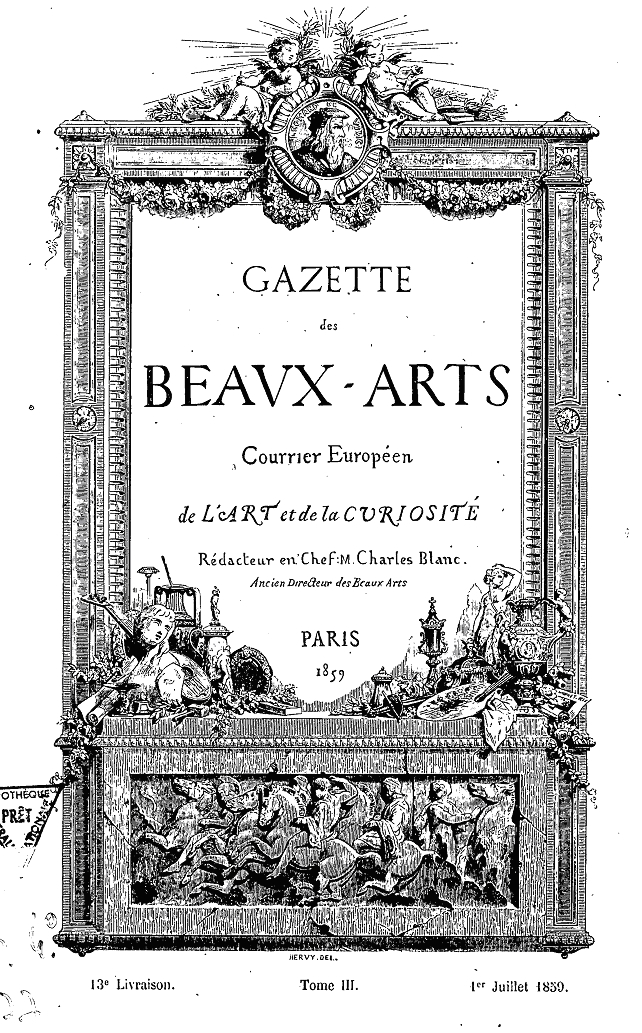
Gazette des Beaux-Arts First year, volume III, 1 July 1859.

The Gazette des Beaux-Arts was a French art review, founded in 1859 by Édouard Houssaye, with Charles Blanc as its first chief editor. Assia Visson Rubinstein was chief editorial secretary under the direction of George Wildenstein from 1936 until 1960. Her papers, which include all editions of the Gazette from this period, are intact at the Cantonal and University Library of Lausanne in Dorigny. The Gazette was a world reference work on art history for nearly 100 years - one other editor in chief, from 1955 to 1987, was Jean Adhémar. It was bought in 1928 by the Wildenstein family, whose last representative was Daniel Wildenstein, its director from 1963 until his death in 2001. The magazine was published monthly and was headquartered in Paris. The review closed in 2002.

== List of directors ==
- 1859–1863: Édouard Houssaye
- 1863–1872: Émile Galichon
- 1872–1875: Maurice Cottier, Édouard André and Ernest Hoschedé
- 1875–1882: Maurice Cottier, Édouard André
- 1882–1897: Mme Cottier, M. and Mme Édouard André. Charles Ephrussi associated from 1885
- 1900–1905: Roger Marx and Charles Ephrussi
- 1905–1928: Théodore Reinach
- 1928–1963: Georges Wildenstein
- 1963–2001: Daniel Wildenstein
- 2001–2002: Guy Wildenstein
