= Bords de la Seine à Argenteuil =

Oil landscape painting claimed to be painted by Claude Monet

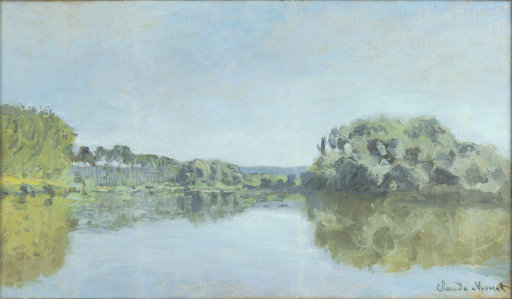
- Artist: unknown
- Medium: Oil on canvas
- Owner: David Joel

Bords de la Seine à Argenteuil (Banks of the Seine at Argenteuil) is an oil painting by an unknown artist. The painting is a landscape depicting the River Seine at Argenteuil in France. It is owned by Englishman David Joel.

In 2011 Bords de la Seine à Argenteuil was featured on the British TV programme Fake or Fortune?, in a failed attempt to establish it as an authentic painting by Claude Monet.

== Fake or Fortune? investigation ==
=== History ===
The title Bords de la Seine à Argenteuil along with the date, 1875, appears on the frame, and there is a painted signature purportedly of Claude Monet.

The painting was sold by Georges Petit in 1918 to the Khalil Palace in Cairo, where it stayed until 1953.

The painting was acquired by art historian David Joel in 1992 for £40,000. The painting had previously been offered for sale at auction, but failed to reach its £500,000 reserve. The painting was included in the "Monet: a Retrospective" exhibition organized by three Japanese museums from February to July 1994: the Artizon Museum (then the Bridgestone Museum of Art), the Nagoya City Art Museum, and the Hiroshima Museum of Art.

For a number of years after he purchased it, Joel attempted to establish it as an authentic Monet.

=== Investigation ===
Journalist Fiona Bruce and art dealer and historian Philip Mould investigated the painting in the first episode of the first series of the BBC One documentary television series Fake or Fortune?, first aired on 19 June 2011. The widely accepted authority on Monet's work is the catalogue raisonné published by the Wildenstein Institute in Paris. One challenge Bruce and Mould faced was that the Wildenstein Institute had already examined the painting once, after the death of Daniel Wildenstein, not accepting it as genuine.

The programme had the picture scanned, the paints analysed, and the brushwork and signature examined by experts. The programme argued that the painting was genuine, an opinion shared by a number of experts. However the Wildenstein Institute did not accept their arguments, and maintains that the painting is a fake, based predominantly on the connoisseurship of the late Daniel Wildenstein.

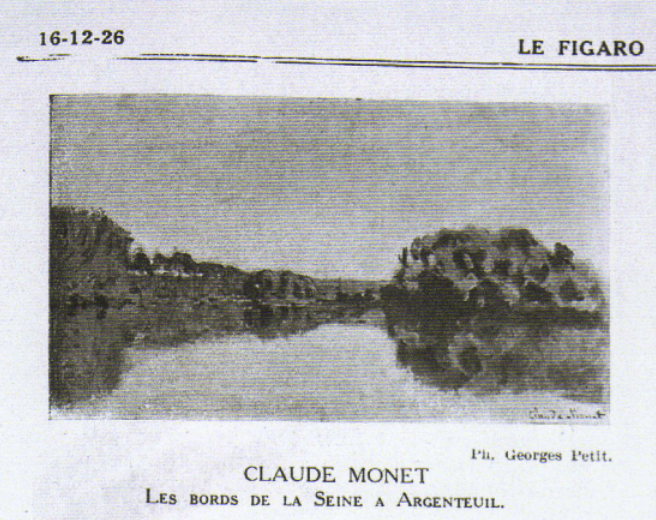
An image of the painting from Monet's obituary in Le Figaro (1926)

The Institute has since been provided with further evidence suggesting the painting is genuine, but the Wildenstein Institute has not changed its verdict and the painting remains excluded from its catalogue raisonné. Prominent art experts Joachim Pissarro, Charles F. Stuckey and Richard Brettell reject the painting’s authenticity.

Joel went to court in 2014 to force the Wildenstein Institute to include the work. He lost the case, appealed, and received a final verdict the courts would not intervene in December 2015. Joel died in 2019.

== Similar works ==
Monet did paint a number of scenes in the Argenteuil area. An acknowledged work with the same title was painted by Monet in 1872. This work was sold at a Sotheby's auction in New York for $4.8 million in 2005.

Businessman Ralph Wilson acquired a Monet painting with the title La Seine a Argenteuil in 1997 from the San Francisco Museum of Modern Art. Wilson held the painting until his death in 2014, at which point it was put up for auction with an estimated value of between $12 million and $17 million.

== See also ==
- List of paintings by Claude Monet
- The Seine at Argenteuil, 1873 by Monet
