= Wildenstein Institute =

French art institute (1970–2017)

Coordinates: 48.8731°N 2.3127°E

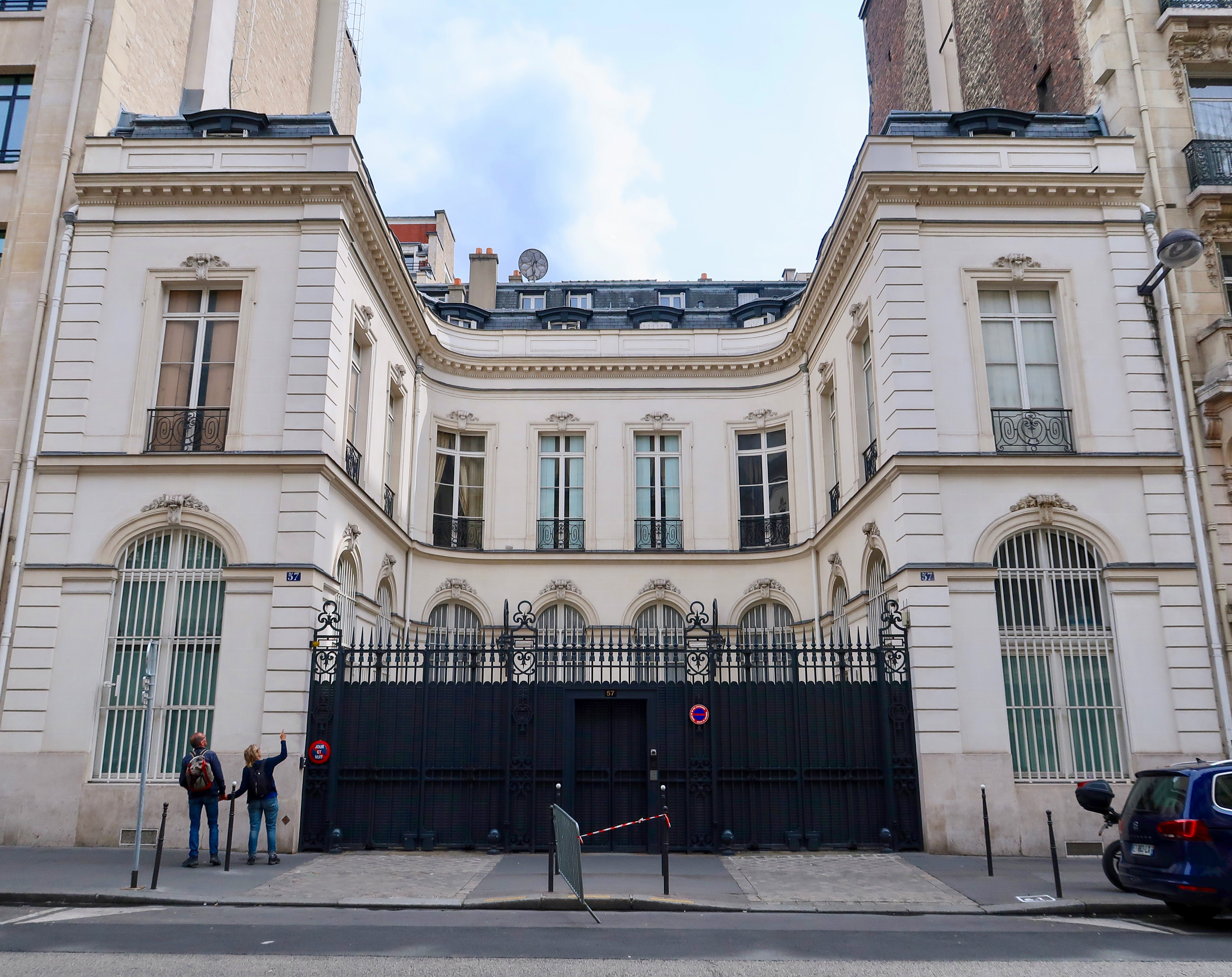
The headquarters of the Wildenstein Institute at 57 rue La Boétie in Paris

The Wildenstein Institute was a French art institute that published catalogues raisonnés and scholarly inventories.

== History ==
The institute was founded in 1970 by Daniel Wildenstein as the Fondation Wildenstein, and it was renamed the Wildenstein Institute in 1990. It was an offshoot of the art dealing company (Wildenstein & Co.) owned by the Wildenstein family for five generations.

Until 2017, it housed the historic documents and photographic archives assembled by Nathan Wildenstein (the company founder) and his son Georges, which have been added to by subsequent generations. Daniel Wildenstein established the Wildenstein Index Number used by the institute to identify paintings.

It published catalogues raisonnés and scholarly inventories of impressionists such as Monet, and other modern artists such as Gauguin. It described itself as a center for research in art history. It was headed by Guy Wildenstein.

In 2017, the Wildenstein Institute gifted its entire archive and the rights to all of its publications to the Wildenstein Plattner Institute, Inc., a non-profit art research foundation based in the U.S. and founded by Guy Wildenstein and the Hasso Plattner Foundation.

== Controversy ==
In 2011, a police raid discovered and seized 30 paintings valued at tens of millions of pounds from the institute's Paris headquarters (see: Guy Wildenstein#Criticism).

The Institute published a Monet catalogue raisonné, which is regarded as the definitive, scholarly compendium of Monet paintings. Acceptance of a Monet by the Institute would significantly increase the commercial value of a painting. The Institute did not authenticate a painting (Bords de la Seine à Argenteuil) investigated by Fiona Bruce (a journalist) and Philip Mould (an art dealer and historian) in the BBC television programme Fake or Fortune?, which first aired on 19 June 2011. The institute has since been featured again on the programme, variously accepting and rejecting the team's efforts.

One of these instances featured on Fake or Fortune?, first aired July 2015, and involved a painting purported to be by Pierre-Auguste Renoir held at Picton Castle, Wales. The Bernheim-Jeune is one of several sources that established provenance for the "Picton Renoir." The BBC investigators unearthed several lines of authenticity, including additional levels of provenance with photographic records of sale and forensically matching pigments and canvas to Renoir. The Bernheim-Jeune Gallery had approved the painting as genuine and have included it in Renoir's catalogue raisonné. The Wildenstein Institute declined to accept the painting citing insufficient evidence. After meeting privately with Guy-Patrice Dauberville of Bernheim-Jeune, host Fiona Bruce quoted Dauberville as saying, "[The Wildenstein institute] would be thrilled to turn it down." She said the rivalry between the Wildenstein Institute and Bernheim-Jeune was "now out in the open" and she described it as "ugly".
