= Marcel Kapferer =

Marcel Kapferer (December 30, 1872 – March 18, 1966) was a prominent French lawyer and art collector based in Paris, widely known for his significant collection of late 19th- and early 20th-century French art.

Born in Paris on Rue de Rivoli, Kapferer worked as an attorney (avocat) and lived much of his life in an hôtel particulier (townhouse) located at 64, Avenue Henri-Martin in the 16th arrondissement.

He married Yvonne Aron in 1914. His daughter, Martine Kapferer (1920–2018), married the French art dealer Daniel Wildenstein in 1939. His brother, Henri Kapferer (1870–1958), was a notable engineer and industrialist who also shared an interest in fine arts.

== Art collection ==
Kapferer was an avid patron of contemporary French artists and assembled a renowned collection, particularly strong in works by the Post-Impressionist and Nabi painters:

He was close friends with artist Édouard Vuillard, who painted portraits of him and his brother Henri. Kapferer commissioned Vuillard to paint a cycle of six decorative panels for the dining room of his Avenue Henri-Martin home. Several of his Vuillard pieces, such as Femme au corsage à rayures, eventually entered national collections.

Paintings from Kapferers collection are currently in major museums. Edouard Vuillard's Interior with Paintings and a Pheasant and Roger de la Fresnays Still Life with a Diabolo are in the Metropolitan Museum of Art, Odile Redon's Jacob and the Angel is in the MoMa and his The Death of Orpheus is at Harvard's Fogg Art Museum. The Dessert by Pierre Bonnard in the Cleveland Museum of Art. Van Gogh's Blossoming Chestnut Trees was in the private Blaquier-Arietta collection, and Three Pairs of Shoes is in the Cleveland Museum of Art. The National Gallery of Art in Washington D.C. has eight artworks that passed through Kapferer.

== Nazi persecution and plunder of the art collection ==
After the Nazis occupied Paris in 1940, Kapferer was targeted because of his Jewish heritage. The Nazi looting organisation known as the Einsatzstab Reichsleiter Rosenberg (ERR) seized works from his collection in April 1944, transferring them to the Jeu de Paume before shipping out to other destinations. Some of these works became part of postwar repatriation and restitution claims. The Database of Cultural Plunder by the Einsatzstab Reichsleiter Rosenberg lists 32 entries for Marcel Kapferer.
