= Lac de Kruth-Wildenstein =

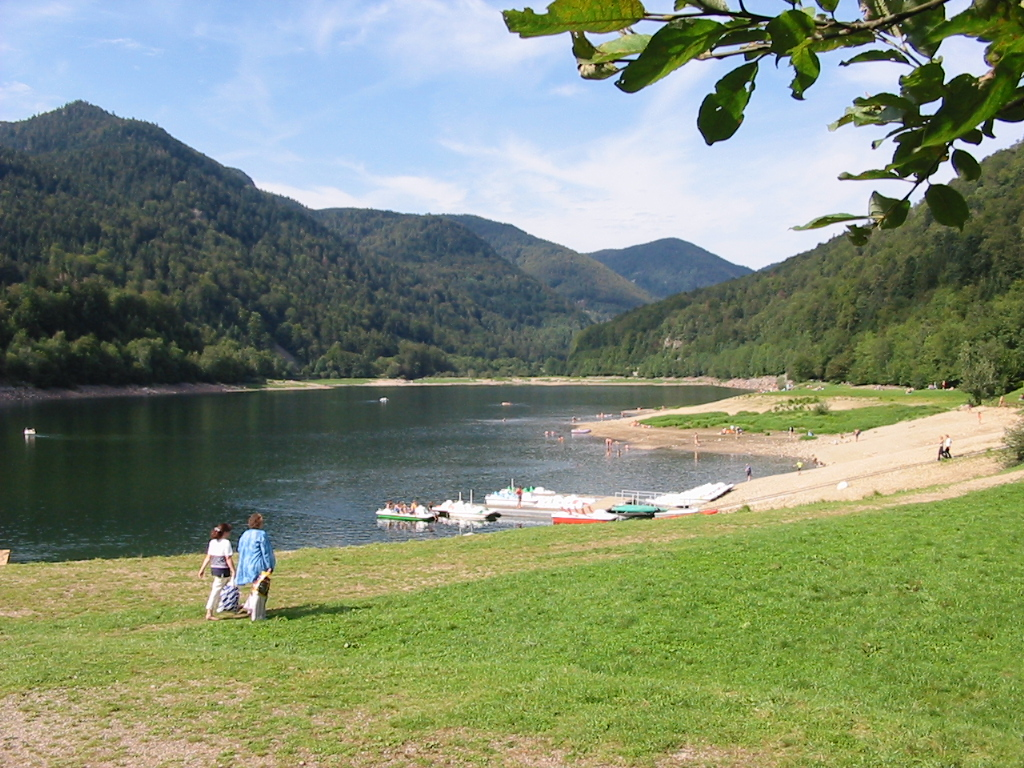

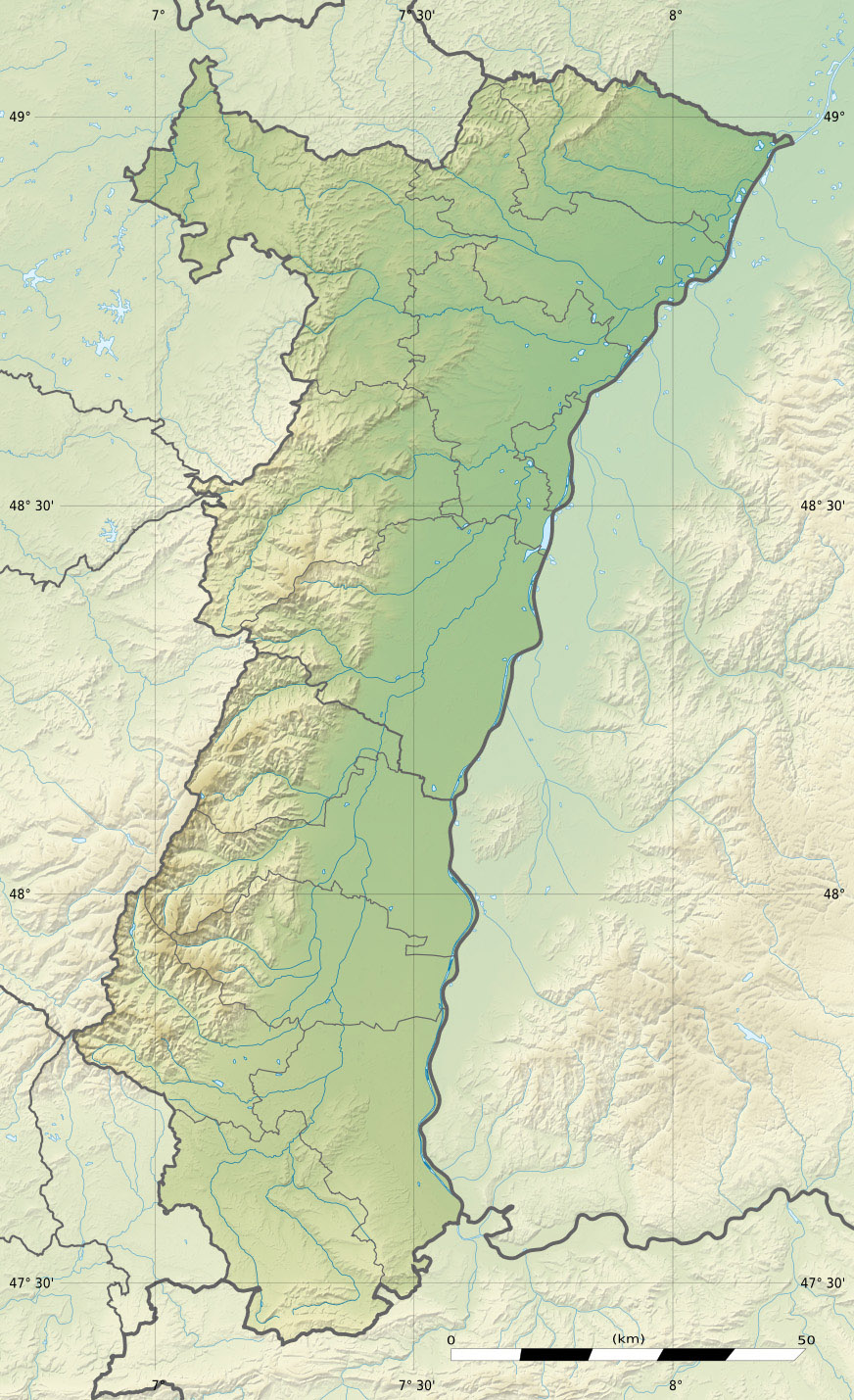
- Location within Alsace
- Location: Haut-Rhin
- Coordinates: 47.955556°N 6.955556°E
- Type: reservoir
- Primary outflows: Thur
- Basin countries: France
- Surface area: 0.81 km^{2} (0.31 sq mi)
- Max. depth: 35 m (115 ft)
- Surface elevation: 545 m (1,788 ft)

Lac de Kruth-Wildenstein is a lake in Haut-Rhin, France. At an elevation of 545 m, its surface area is 0.81 km^{2}.
