= Alphonse Kann =

French art collector (1870–1948)

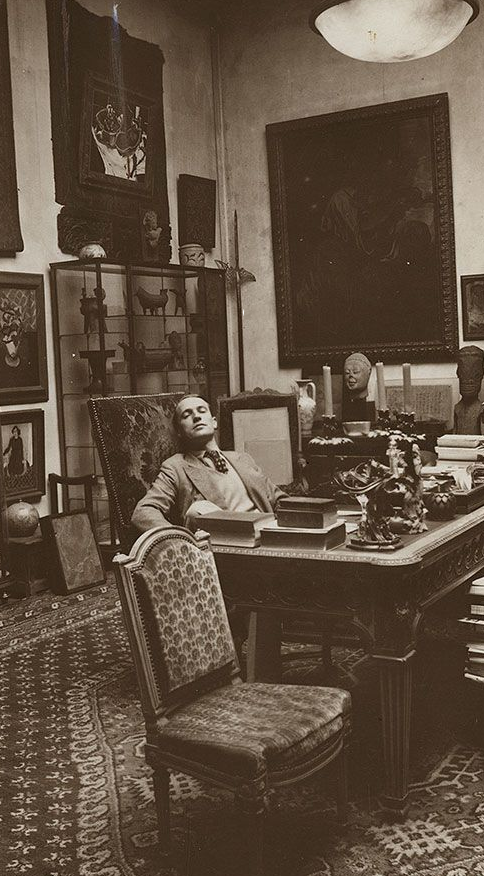
Photographic portrait of Peter Pitt-Millward, at Alphonse Kann's home, Saint-Germain-en-Laye.

Alphonse Kann (14 March 1870 in Vienna – 1948 in London) was a prominent French art collector of Jewish heritage. He was a childhood playmate and adult friend of the writer Marcel Proust, who incorporated several of Kann's features into the character Charles Swann (in Swann in Love).

== Art collector ==
The name Kann, written with double "nn", was said in Paris to be "le plus chic du chic". Known for his discerning taste and shrewd collecting instincts, Kann shocked the art world in 1927 by auctioning off (at the American Art Association, New York City) most of his Old Master collection (including works by Bruegel, Cimabue, Fragonard, Pollaiuolo, Rubens and Tintoretto) in order to concentrate on the acquisition of 19th-century and modern art, which he collected vigorously over the following decade.

== Nazi theft ==
Fernand Léger, Smoke over Rooftops, 1911

Kann left France for England in 1938 without making an inventory of his eclectic art collection, which was kept in a St.-Germain-en-Laye mansion and subsequently looted in October 1940 by Nazi occupiers. Included in the plunder were 1,400 paintings, sculptures and art objects, which were first taken to the Louvre and then to the Jeu de Paume. There they were inventoried by the Nazi art looting organization known as the Reichsleiter Rosenberg Taskforce or ERR. Some of the objects were then taken to Germany or Austria. Kann recovered only a small fraction of his large collection before his death in England in 1948. Although he did not live to see a copy, the Nazi inventory of Kann's art collection ran to 60 typed pages. Decades after the war, several paintings from Kann's collection were discovered in prominent European and U.S. museums. "Smoke Over Rooftops," a 1911 painting by Fernand Léger, was returned in October 2008 to Kann's heirs by the Minneapolis Institute of Art after an eleven-year investigation.

In the 1990s, eight antique manuscripts once owned by Kann turned up in the vaults of Wildenstein & Company, still bearing the distinctive Nazi catalog numbers ("KA 879" to "KA 886", in red pencil) likely made by Bruno Lohse as he processed the Kann collection in the Jeu de Paume. The discovery of the missing manuscripts prompted a lawsuit by Kann's heirs against Wildenstein & Company.
