= Wildenstein Index Number =

A Wildenstein Index Number refers to an item in a numerical system published in catalogues by Daniel Wildenstein, a scholar of Impressionism, who published catalogues raisonnés of artists such as Claude Monet, Édouard Manet and Paul Gauguin through his family business, Wildenstein & Company. In these catalogues, each painting by an artist was assigned a unique number. These index numbers are now used throughout the art world, in art texts, and on art websites to uniquely identify specific works of art by specific artists.

An example is the Monet: Catalogue Raisonné (ISBN 978-3-8228-8559-8), which is a four volume set published in 1996 with 2,580 illustrations in 1,540 pages. In this set, volume I is a biography and volumes II-IV contain a chronological listing of Monet's work; that is to say, volume II contains Wildenstein Index No. 1 produced in 1858 through No. 968 produced in 1885. The catalogue is produced with text in French, English, and German. The original version of this set was a five-volume black-and-white edition that has become collectible at costs of approximately U.S.$10,000 because it was originally only available to large museums or major universities' art departments. The original black-and-white version was published in 1974 in four volumes and had a 1991 supplementary volume of additional paintings as well as drawings and pastels. The 1996 revised edition in multiple languages does not include pastels, drawings, letters or footnotes from the original edition. Thus, the original is the most valuable resource for scholars. (Note: However, this gives the foundation an effective monopoly over deciding whether a work of art is a genuine Monet, or not. This has been called into question, as the Wildensteins are free to disregard the opinions of art experts and art historians worldwide if they so choose (as discussed in the BBC programme Fake or Fortune? broadcast by the BBC on June 19, 2011 referring to the painting Bords de la Seine à Argenteuil). See: "Monet". Fake or Fortune?. Episode 1. June 19, 2011. BBC.)

Although most of the catalogues are published with Daniel as the author, other members of the five-generation family business were also responsible for promulgating this numbering system. Daniel's father Georges Wildenstein published catalogues raisonnés for Jean-Honoré Fragonard and Jean-Baptiste-Siméon Chardin in the 1960s. His son, Alec, has published a catalogue for Odilon Redon.

== See also ==
- Opus number
- Wildenstein Institute
