= 19 East 64th Street =

Historic building in Manhattan, New York

Coordinates: 40°46.02′0″N 73°58.164′0″W

19 East 64th Street

The Wildenstein & Company Building is an edifice that stands at 19 East 64th Street, near Madison Avenue on the Upper East Side of Manhattan in New York City. It is five stories tall and was completed in early 1932. The building was designed in French 18th-century style by Philadelphia, Pennsylvania, architect Horace Trumbauer. Its facade is made of limestone.

The Wildenstein art firm was located in the former Vanderbilt house at 647 Fifth Avenue, between 51st and 52nd Streets, for several years prior to the structure's completion. The Charles F. Noyes Company arranged a five-year extension of a $545,000 mortgage at 5% in June 1932.

In October 1993, Wildenstein & Company purchased 49% of the Pace Gallery; the Wildenstein gallery remained at the Wildenstein Building, and Pace's SoHo branch at 142 Greene Street also became part of the combined business. In April 2010, the combined gallery announced it was splitting, and Pace bought out Wildenstein's 49%.

In 1997 the house had up to 11 members of the Wildenstein family living in it at any one time, leading art dealer Harry Brooks to humorously call the house the "most expensive tenement in Manhattan". The government of Qatar planned to buy the house for $90 million in 2014 and operate it as a consulate. The Russian businessman Len Blavatnik, who had planned to buy the house, sued David Wildenstein, believing that the Wildenstein family had reneged on a promise to sell Blavatnik the property for $79 million. A judge rejected the suit in March 2017, stating that the verbal agreement was not legally binding.

In April 2017 it became the most expensive townhouse ever sold in Manhattan when it was sold for $79.5 million. The building was sold again in February 2018 to Blavatnik for $90 million. The Skarstedt Gallery announced plans in January 2019 to move into the house. Since 2023, it has housed Lévy Gorvy Dayan's flagship gallery.
