= Joseph Reinach =

French politician (1856–1921)

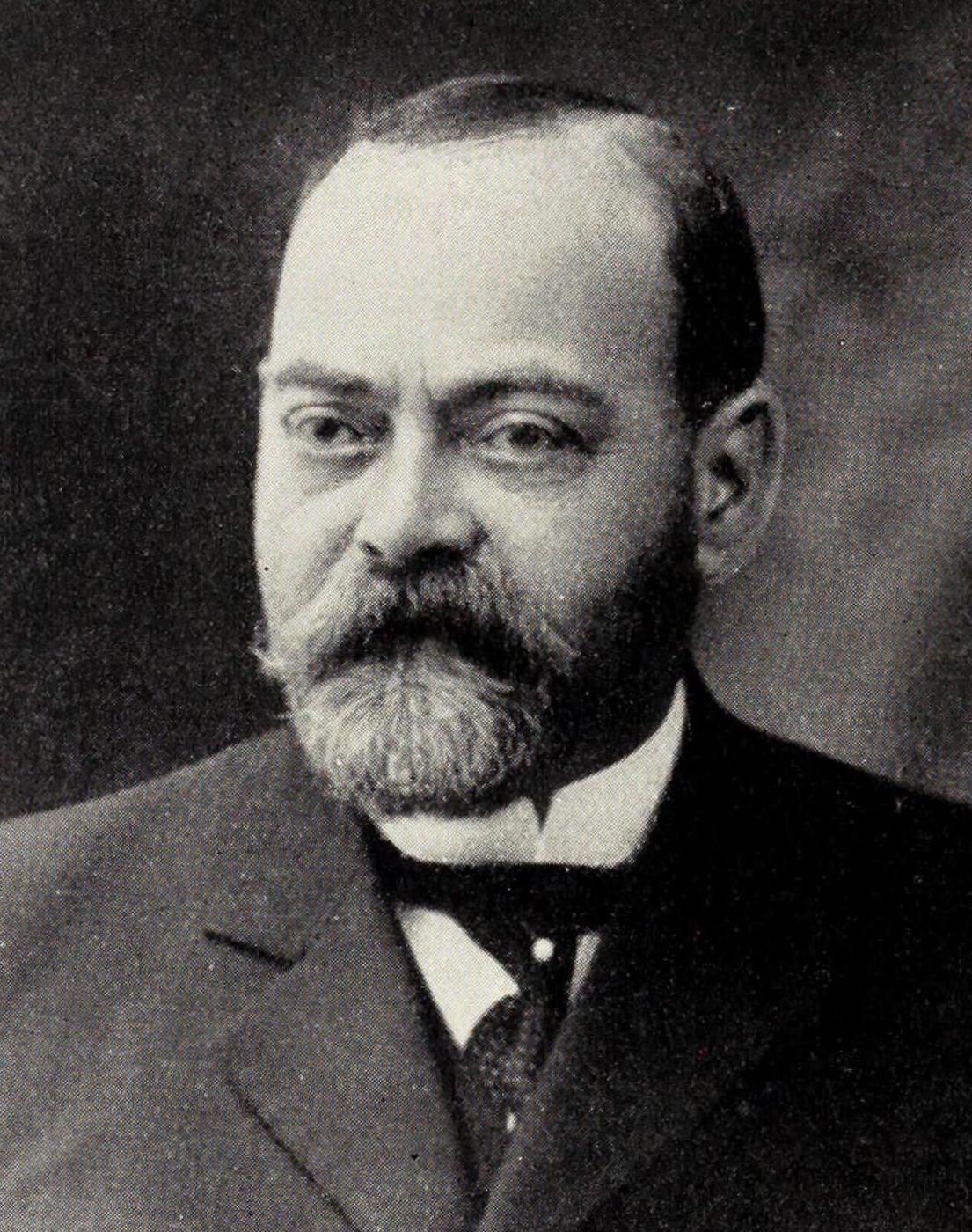
- Born: 30 September 1856; Paris, France
- Died: 21 April 1921 (aged 64); Paris, France
- Spouse: Henriette-Clémentine Reinach
- Parent(s): Hermann-Joseph Reinach and Julie Büding
- Family: Julie Goujon (daughter); Adolphe Reinach (son); Salomon Reinach (brother); Théodore Reinach (brother); Jacques de Reinach (cousin); Albert von Reinach (cousin)

Joseph Reinach (French pronunciation: [ʁɛ.nak], 30 September 1856 – 18 April 1921) was a French author and politician.

== Biography ==
He was born in Paris. His two brothers Salomon Reinach and Théodore Reinach would later be known in the field of archaeology. After studying at Lycée Condorcet, he was called to the bar in 1887. He attracted the attention of Léon Gambetta by writing articles on Balkan politics for the Revue bleue, and joined the staff of La République française. In Gambetta's grand ministère, Reinach was his secretary and tried to obtain a partial revision of the constitution and list proportional representation. In La République française he waged a steady war against General Boulanger, which resulted in three duels, one with Edmond Magnier and two with Paul Déroulède. Between 1889 and 1898, he sat for the Chamber of Deputies for Digne.

As a member of the army commission, reporter of the budgets of the ministries of the interior and of agriculture he brought forward bills for the better treatment of the insane, for the establishment of a colonial ministry, for the taxation of alcoholic beverages, and for the reparation of judicial errors. He advocated complete freedom of the theatre and the press, the abolition of public executions, and denounced political corruption of all kinds.

However, Reinach is best known as the champion of Alfred Dreyfus. At the time of the original trial, he attempted to secure a public hearing of the case, and, in 1897, he allied himself with Auguste Scheurer-Kestner to demand its revision. He denounced in the Siècle the Henry forgery and Esterhazy's complicity. His articles in the Siècle aroused the fury of the anti-Dreyfus party, especially as Reinach was a Jew and was accused by some of taking up Dreyfus's defence on racial grounds.

He lost his seat in the Chamber of Deputies and, having refused to fight Henri Rochefort, an anti-Dreyfus journalist, eventually brought an action for libel against the latter. Finally, Dreyfus was pardoned, Reinach wrote a history of the case that was completed in 1905. Henri Dutrait-Croyon's Joseph Reinach, historien (Paris: A. Savaète, 1905), a violent detailed rebuttal of Reinach's history that "became a bible for that anti-Semitic section of French public opinion convinced of the culpability of Dreyfus."

In 1906, Reinach was re-elected for Digne. In that year, he became a member of the commission of the national archives, and the following year a member of the council on prisons. Reinach was a prolific writer on political subjects. He published three volumes on Léon Gambetta in 1884 and also edited Gambetta's speeches.

Joseph and his wife Henriette-Clémentine had a son, Adolphe Reinach, born in 1887, and a daughter, Julie Reinach (1885-1971). Adolphe became an archaeologist and Egyptologist known mainly for his discovery of the Coptos Decrees. He was killed in the first month of the First World War, in August 1914. Julie married Pierre Goujon.
