= Héctor Feliciano =

Puerto Rican journalist and author (born 1952)

Hector Feliciano
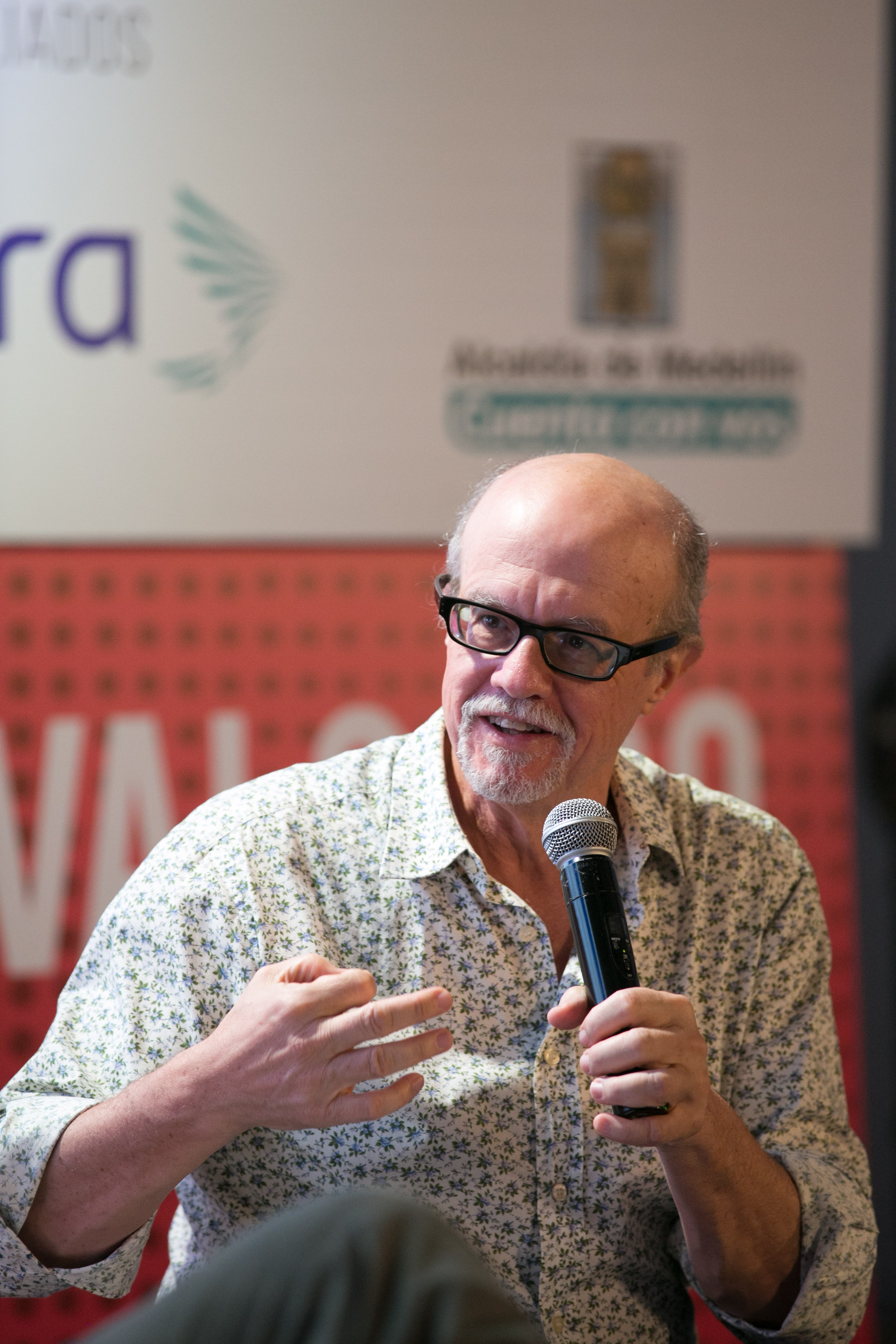
- Héctor Feliciano in 2016
- Born: 1952 (age 73–74); Philadelphia, Pennsylvania
- Occupations: journalist, writer
- Writing career
- Notable work: "The Lost Museum: The Nazi Conspiracy to Steal the World's Greatest Works of Art."

Hector Feliciano (born 1952) is a Puerto Rican journalist and author whose book "The Lost Museum: The Nazi Conspiracy to Steal the World's Greatest Works of Art" has shed light on an estimated 20,000 works of art plundered by the Nazis; each one is owned by a museum or a collector somewhere.

== Early years ==
Feliciano was born in Philadelphia, Pennsylvania of Puerto Rican parents (Héctor and Nereida), while his father was concluding his MD residency. He was raised in San Juan, the capital city of Puerto Rico where he received his primary and secondary education, graduating from Colegio San Ignacio de Loyola. During the early part of his youth he became interested in studying art and culture, however his family expected him to follow his father's footsteps and study medicine.

Feliciano moved to Waltham, Massachusetts, and attended Brandeis University, earning in 1974 his bachelor's degree in History and Art History. Feliciano earned his master's degree in the Columbia University Graduate School of Journalism. He then went to Paris and earned a doctorate in literature at the University of Paris while working for the city of Paris cultural affairs bureau.

He began his career as a cultural writer for the Paris bureau of the Washington Post. In 1988, Feliciano was working on an article for the Paris bureau of the Los Angeles Times about a stolen Murillo painting that had been bought by the Louvre, when someone mentioned that 20 percent of the looted art during World War II is still missing. During the process of his reporting he realized that no one had ever asked the looted families about the situation.

== Nazi art looting ==
During the Third Reich, agents acting on behalf of the ruling Nazi Party of Germany organized the spoliation of art of European countries. The Nazis confiscated artworks from prominent Jewish collectors and from dealers whose galleries were taken over. Ordinary people, too, lost their art treasures when they left them behind in their homes, as they fled or were sent to Nazi concentration camps. The plundering occurred from 1933 until the end of World War II, although most of the plundered art was acquired during the war. Many of these items were recovered by the Allies immediately following the war, however many more are still missing.

== The Lost Museum ==
Informed by the original research of Lynn H. Nicholas, author of the ground-breaking book, The Rape of Europa: The Fate of Europe's Treasures in the Third Reich and World War II, Feliciano did additional research on the issue for his book in 1989, using – in addition to Nicholas' work – material from German looting inventories, documents that had been declassified and more than 200 interviews with art dealers, art historians and the surviving relatives of the families who were victimized. At first, Feliciano believed that the families involved would be hesitant to cooperate in his investigation, however the five families whose stories would be the core of the book, the Rothschilds, the Rosenbergs, the Bernheim-Jeunes, the David-Weills and the Schlosses trusted him with their records and their memories and other families welcomed him.

The French government ministries and museums refused to let Feliciano see their records and kept stalling until he was finally permitted to gain access through information requests lodged by the victims' families. Feliciano also had the help of someone from the Ministry of Culture who secretly provided him with documents sent from the Ministry of Culture to the Ministry of Justice which proved that the French museums mingled looted works with their collections. Feliciano had befriended a 92-year-old art dealer by the name of Alfred Daber who remembered all the wartime gossip in regard to the dealings that went on with the looted art. During his investigations Feliciano went to Washington, D.C. to work in the United States National Archives and discovered that Daber himself had been dealing in looted art.

In 1997, Feliciano published his book: The Lost Museum: The Nazi Conspiracy to Steal the World's Greatest Works of Art (first published in french two years early with the title Le musée Perdu). Feliciano tried to publish his book in the United States and was turned down by at least 30 publishers. He then went to a publishing house in France, where it was picked up almost immediately. In his book he traces the art works looted as they passed through the hands of top German officials, unscrupulous art dealers, and unwitting auction houses such as Christie's and Sotheby's. He also revealed that the Musée National d'Art Moderne in Paris was amongst the institutions in France and Switzerland that held works that had been seized from Jewish victims during the war by the Germans (these works are now referred to as Musées Nationaux Récupération or MNRs).

Feliciano exposed the code utilized by the museum to keep track of the provenance of the works in the collection: "R" referred for "recuperation" and the number following it signified the order in which the work arrived at the museum. Feliciano charged the museum's curators with having "made no huge effort" to find the rightful owners for "thousands of unclaimed works".

The book, which was first published in French, has since been translated into several other languages, including in Russian. After the book's successful European publication HarperCollins, a U.S. publishing house that had initially turned it down (amongst 30 others), bought the U.S. publication rights. The book points out also the role of Switzerland, whose legislation is very favourable to dishonest dealers and Russia, which categorically refuses to give back the stolen works of art found in Germany at the end of WW2 to their legitimate owners.

== Aftermath ==
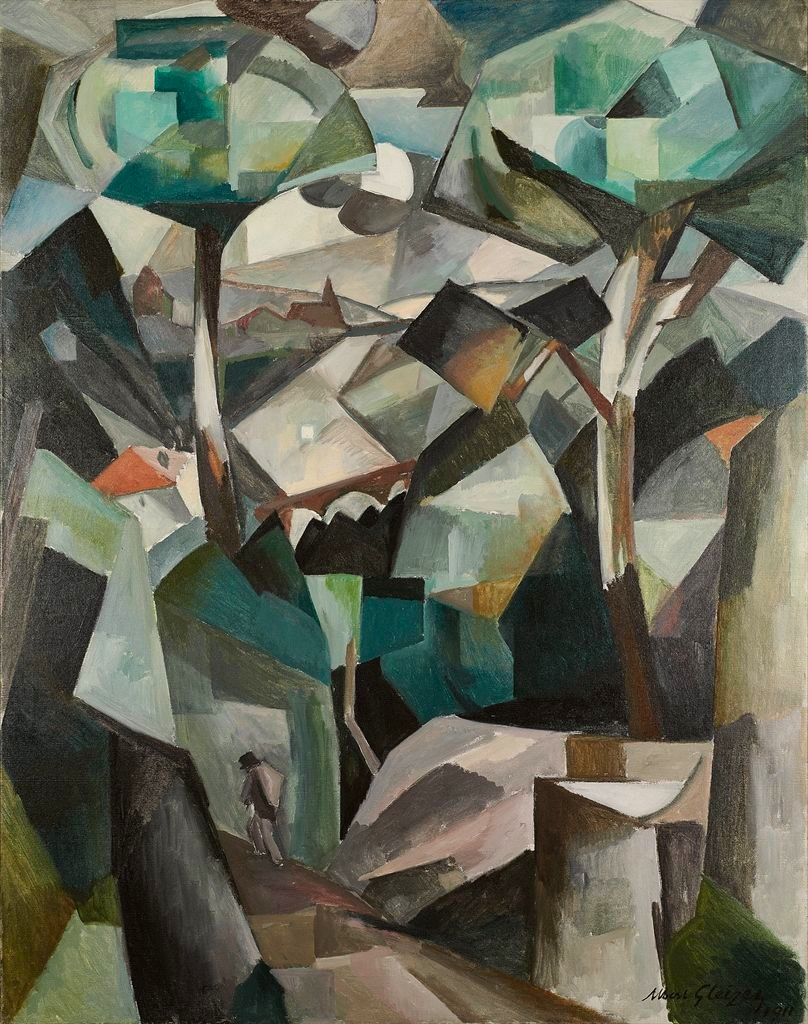
Albert Gleizes, 1911, Le Chemin, Paysage à Meudon, Paysage avec personnage (Landscape), oil on canvas, 146.4 x 114.4 cm, identified by Hector Feliciano as one of the many art works looted by the Nazis during WW II

The French government had to increase efforts to find original owners (or their heirs) of the nearly 2,000 looted works of arts stolen by Nazi Germany. A Matisse painting titled "Oriental Woman Seated on Floor," was identified in the Seattle Art Museum as a piece that belonged to the heirs of Paul Rosenberg by someone who read the book. The Rosenberg family then laid claim to the painting. The "Paysage" (pictured), a 1911 Cubist landscape by Albert Gleizes at the Pompidou Center was identified by Hector Feliciano as having been looted by the Nazis from the home of collector Alphonse Kann during World War II. It was returned to the heirs of Alphonse Kann.

Families whose art collections were plundered by the Nazis are reclaiming prized paintings that have been found hanging in museums around the world. Auction houses have also stopped sales of works because their postwar sellers may have been thieves.

Neither Switzerland or Russia did anything in favour of the legitimate owners or their heirs.

== Litigation ==
In 1999, a French court rejected a claim for $1 million in damages brought by the Wildenstein family against Feliciano, who suggested in his book that the French-Jewish family did business with Nazi officials during Germany's wartime occupation of France. In the book Feliciano claims that the powerful dealer and collector did business with Nazi art dealers before the war and for months after France's occupation by Germany in June 1940. He also said that after Wildenstein went into exile in New York in January 1941, he maintained contacts with a former employee, Roger Duquoy, who ran the Paris gallery until 1944. The three-judge lower court stated the following in reaching their decision:

The Lost Museum: the Nazi Conspiracy to Steal the World's Greatest Works of Art, as well as new documents presented to the court, the judges said that "Hector Feliciano had in his hands elements that permitted him to believe that Georges Wildenstein maintained direct and indirect relations with German authorities during the occupation."

The family of the Parisian art dealer Paul Rosenberg recovered paintings by Matisse, Monet, Léger and Bonnard. In 2001, Feliciano sued the Rosenberg family alleging that Mrs. Rosenberg, the widow of Mr. Rosenberg's son, Alexandre had made an oral contract with him promising that she would compensate him for tracking down paintings that were returned to the family in recent years. Feliciano was asking a 17.5 percent of the estimated $39 million value of the paintings as a finders fee, however Mrs. Rosenberg denied she had an oral contract with Feliciano and said he had not been responsible for recovering the paintings. The case was dismissed by Justice Charles E. Ramos, a State Supreme Court justice in Manhattan in February 2003.

== Later years ==
During the 1998–99 academic year, as part of the National Arts Journalism Program, Feliciano was one of fourteen journalists selected for a Journalism Fellowship by Columbia University, in which he specialized in arts and culture. He continued to live in Paris and was the editor in chief of World Media Network, a newspaper syndicate serving 23 European newspapers. Feliciano worked as the director of the Ministry of Culture and the "Club des Poètes" in Paris before moving to New York City where he writes for El Pais and Clarin.

Feliciano is a Fellow of the New York Institute for the Humanities at New York University, and has served on the Panel of Experts of the Presidential Commission on Holocaust Assets in the United States. He is the organizer of the First International Symposium on Cultural Property and Patrimony (Columbia University, 1999) and of a panel discussion entitled "The Art of the Enemy" (School of Visual Arts in New York City, 2002). Feliciano is currently teaching an honors seminar on religious art at New York University.

== See also ==
- List of Puerto Rican writers
- List of Puerto Ricans
- Puerto Rican literature
- Nazi plunder
- Looted art
- Musées nationaux récupération
