= Catalogue raisonné =

Comprehensive, annotated listing of all the known artworks by an artist

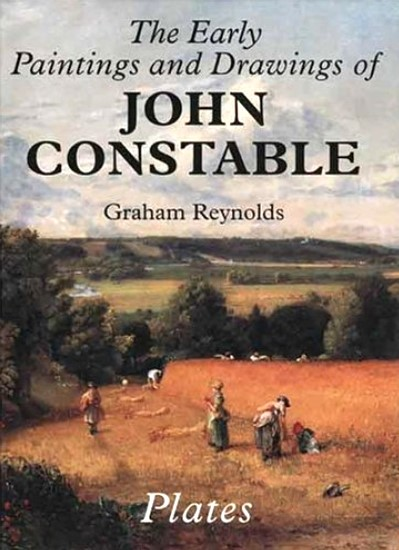
A volume from Graham Reynolds's catalogue raisonné of John Constable

A catalogue raisonné (French pronunciation: [katalɔg ʁɛzone]) or critical catalogue is an annotated listing of the works of an artist or group of artists and can contain all works or a selection of works categorised by different parameters such as medium or period.

A catalogue raisonné is normally produced by the artist or by a committee of family members, experts or academics, collectively known as "producers". The catalogue ordinarily contains a list of characteristics of an artwork such as the title, year of production, dimensions, medium and a description of the work, alongside an image of the work. Some catalogues also include scholarly commentary about each work or, sometimes, commentary about a piece from the artist. This information is relied upon by others to identify works and plays an important role in authentication.

While historically catalogues raisonnés have been produced as physical books, there is a shift towards catalogues existing only in digital form, such as those of the artists Isamu Noguchi, Paul César Helleu, Martin Wong, and Roy Lichtenstein.

Depending on the nationality of the artist or the country in which the catalogue's producers are based, other terms may be used which include: "critical catalogue", "complete works", œuvre, catalogo razonado, catalogo ragionato, catalogo generale, opera completa and Werkverzeichnis.

== Etymology ==
The term catalogue raisonné is French, meaning "reasoned catalogue" (i.e. containing arguments for the information given, such as attributions), but is part of the technical terminology of the English-speaking art world. The spelling is never Americanized to "catalog", even in the United States. The French pluralization catalogues raisonnés is used. (Note: As seen in the CRSA homepage, catalogueraisonne.org.)

== Process ==
A catalogue raisonné is produced by the artist or an appointed committee of experts known as the catalogue's "producers". The process of creating and updating the catalogue is normally based on the research and investigation of art historians and other experts. It often takes many years to complete. A team of 25 professionals created the three-volume catalogue raisonné of American painter Robert Motherwell over the course of 11 years led by the Dedalus Foundation and published by Yale University Press in 2012.

Once a catalogue raisonné has been created, the producers continue to meet periodically as new works are discovered or submitted to them for their consideration. Members of the public, museums and galleries can all propose work for the consideration of the producers.

For most submissions, the works are ordinarily submitted to the producers alongside historic photographs, exhibition catalogues, dealer's records, and other archival documentation to evidence the provenance of an artwork. When such documentation does not exist, works can be considered using scientific evidence and forensic techniques. Producers are free to define their policies for inclusion and may include works in the catalogue raisonné based on their own educated opinions and professional experience.

The College Art Association and the Catalogue Raisonné Scholars Association have both created protocols and best practice for the creation of Catalogues Raisonnés. There is no collective body to decide on the authority of a given catalogue raisonné which can sometimes result in more than one catalogue being produced for the same body of work, not unlike the production of many biographies of one person. The work of the artist Amedeo Modigliani is the subject of at least five catalogues raisonnés.

The catalogue raisonné is often described as the complete catalogue of an artists work. Other catalogues include only a subset of the artists works. (For example it is common to omit the juvenile works of an artist, related ephemera, potentially but not absolutely genuine works (see Roy Lichtenstein), and unfinished, abandoned or destroyed works.)

== Authentication ==
The New York Times has described catalogues raisonnés as the "supreme arbiter of the genuine and fake". In the case of deceased artists, the producer of a catalogue raisonné may have considerable power to determine whether a particular work is regarded as authentic or not. (Note: Wildenstein Index Number)

The inclusion of an artwork in the catalogue raisonné can be considered as a mark of authenticity and the inclusion in or exclusion from a respected catalogue can have a considerable effect on the market price of a work, amounting in some cases to large sums of money. Inclusion has been called the difference between "great wealth and the gutter", and auction houses sometimes refuse to handle unlisted works. This has led to some catalogue raisonné producers being the targets of lawsuits, bribes and death threats. For this reason, some catalogues raisonnés producers have decided to not update their catalogues, irrespective of new discoveries, for fear of legal action from sellers and buyers unhappy with a particular decision. In 2012, the Andy Warhol Art Authentication Board was dissolved, citing as the primary reason the substantial legal fees incurred in defense of its authentication activities.

To distance themselves from liability, some institutions like the Wildenstein Institute, who were once responsible for the catalogues raisonnés of impressionists such as Monet, had a stated policy for considering works which was: 'After examination, and based on the opinion of the members of the committee, a recommendation is made in the form of the intention to include or not to include the work under study; a third possibility also exists, that of continuing the examination of the work. Under no circumstance is a recommendation to be considered as a certificate of authenticity or appraisal, and no justification will be provided for said recommendation.'

Some bodies of work have no published catalogue raisonné but organisations exist who are regarded as having the same authority for authentication as the producers of catalogue raisonné. These organisations are usually made up of the descendants of the artist, members of an artists foundation, or other academic bodies.

== Controversies ==
When works are submitted for consideration to the producers of an artist's catalogue raisonné the works are normally returned to the owner once the process has concluded. The Wildenstein Institute, for example, had a policy stating "Whatever the committee's recommendation, the work will be returned upon presentation of the consignment receipt".

However, there has been evidence of some producers of catalogue raisonné refusing to return works or having them destroyed. In 2014, the Chagall Committee deemed a work that was submitted to be a forgery and informed the owner that they intend to destroy the artwork either with the agreement of the owner or through the courts under the legal precedent of droit moral. The art historian Dr Bendor Grosvenor criticised the decision to destroy the painting. Art dealer and TV Presenter Philip Mould said of the decision "I would now [think] three times or more before sending [works] to Paris. Ugly acts like the one proposed by the Committee can have the effect of damaging the progress of art history."

The reality of more than one body creating competing catalogue raisonné can sometimes lead to rivalries that can lead to anomalous listings. During the process of authenticating a waterscape by Pierre-Auguste Renoir currently on display at Picton Castle, two of the artist's competing catalogue producers, the Wildenstein Institute and Bernheim-Jeune, reached different conclusions about the painting's authenticity. It is reported that Guy-Patrice Dauberville of Bernheim-Jeune said of the matter "[The Wildenstein institute] would be thrilled to turn [the Renoir] down." A journalist at the time said the rivalry between the two is "now out in the open" and described it as "ugly".

In 2013 Christian Parisot, the president of the Modigliani Institute, responsible for the Catalogue of Italian painter Amedeo Modigliani, was arrested for knowingly issuing certificates of authenticity to forged artworks.

== Examples ==
Artist	Catalogue Raisonné Title	Producers
Andy Warhol	Andy Warhol Prints: A Catalogue Raisonné 1962-1987	Frayda Feldman, Claudia Defendi, Jörg Schellmann
Salvador Dalí	The Catalogue Raisonné of Paintings by Salvador Dalí	Fundació Gala-Salvador Dalí
Antonio de La Gándara	Antonio de La Gandara. Le catalogue de son œuvre. 1861-1917.	Xavier Mathieu
Pol Bury	Pol Bury: Online Catalogue Raisonné	Gilles Marquenie, Pol Bury Research Center, Patrick Derom Gallery
Claude Monet	Monet: Catalogue raisonné – Werkverzeichnis	Daniel Wildenstein, Wildenstein Institute
Pierre-Auguste Renoir	Renoir : Catalogue Raisonné of the Still Lifes.	WPI Renoir Committee
Pierre-Auguste Renoir	RENOIR, Catalogue raisonné des tableaux, pastels, dessins et aquarelles	Guy-Patrice & Michel Dauberville, Bernheim-Jeune
Paul Cézanne	CEZANNE – Tome I & Tome II	Guy-Patrice & Michel Dauberville, Bernheim-Jeune
Amedeo Modigliani	Modigliani Catalogue Raisonné	The Modigliani Project
Amedeo Modigliani	Catalogue of the Painted Work of Modigliani	Ambrogio Ceroni
Amedeo Modigliani	Catalogue Raisonné de l’œuvre peint et dessiné de Jeanne Hébuterne	Daniel Wildenstein, Marc Restellini, Instiut Restellini

== See also ==
- Catalogues of classical compositions, the same practice in music
