= Georges Wildenstein =

French art dealer and art historian (1892–1963)

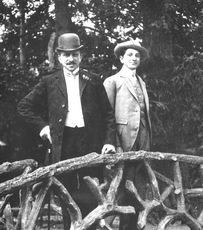
- Georges Wildenstein (right) and his father, Nathan, in 1908
- Born: Georges Lazare Wildenstein; 16 March 1892; Paris, France
- Died: 11 June 1963 (aged 71); Paris, France
- Spouse: Jeanne Lévy
- Children: 2, including Daniel
- Relatives: Guy and Alec Wildenstein (grandsons)

Georges Lazare Wildenstein (16 March 1892 – 11 June 1963) was a French gallery owner, art dealer, art collector, editor and art historian.

== Life ==
Georges Lazare Wildenstein was born on 16 March 1892 to Laure (née Lévy) and Nathan Wildenstein. Nathan came from a family of Jewish cattle-dealers, but in 1870, at age 20, left Alsace, when it was annexed by the German Empire in the Franco-Prussian War, and moved to Paris. There, he based himself in a tailor's house and served as an intermediary for a client who was selling paintings. He had a sister, Elisabeth Wildenstein Paraf, and a brother, Paul-Lazare Wildenstein.

In 1905 he set up a gallery on Rue La Boétie, as well as a stable of racing horses. Georges began work at his father's gallery and developed an interest in Pablo Picasso's paintings and a friendship with Claude Monet. Nathan bought Georges a separate business at 21 rue de la Boétie, where Georges partnered with the art dealer Paul Rosenberg, who represented Picasso. Georges also opened a gallery on New Bond Street in London.

He edited the Gazette des Beaux-Arts review founded by Charles Blanc, and founded the revue Arts himself. Specialising in French paintings, he published several works on French art and wrote catalogues raisonné of the works of Paul Gauguin and Jean Siméon Chardin.

The family was stripped of French nationality in 1940 and fled to the United States, as their Paris gallery was "aryanised". After the war, Wildenstein was accused of theft and trading with the Nazis, but the family fought and refuted the action brought against them by Daniel Malraux.

In 1963 he was elected to the Académie des Beaux-Arts, succeeding Paul Léon. Malraux's father, André Malraux, voted against his election. His son, Daniel Wildenstein, took over as head of the gallery and editor of the Gazette des Beaux-Arts.

He was married to Jeanne "Jane" Lévy and had two children: Daniel Wildenstein and Miriam Wildenstein Pereire.
