= Argenteuil (disambiguation) =

Argenteuil (French pronunciation: [aʁʒɑ̃tœj]) is a commune in the northwestern suburbs of Paris, France. It can also refer to:

== Places ==
In Canada:

- Argenteuil Regional County Municipality, in southern Quebec
  - Argenteuil County, Quebec, an historic county in southwestern Quebec, replaced by above
- Argenteuil—Papineau—Mirabel, a federal electoral district in Quebec
  - Argenteuil (electoral district), a former federal electoral district in Quebec, replaced by above
  - Argenteuil—La Petite-Nation, the federal riding to replace Argenteuil—Papineau—Mirabel in 2015
- Argenteuil (provincial electoral district), a provincial electoral district in Quebec
- Argenteuil, a historic district in the Province of Canada
- Saint-André-d'Argenteuil, a municipality in the Laurentides region of Quebec

In France:

- Arrondissement of Argenteuil, an arrondissement in the Val-d'Oise Département
  - Canton of Argenteuil-1
  - Canton of Argenteuil-2
  - Canton of Argenteuil-3
- Argenteuil-sur-Armançon, a commune in the Yonne department in Burgundy in north-central France
- Gare d'Argenteuil, a rail station in Argenteuil, Paris
- Les Églises-d'Argenteuil, a commune in the Charente-Maritime department in France

In Belgium:

- A castle near Waterloo, Belgium

== Art ==
- Several paintings based on or named after Argenteuil, France, including
  - Argenteuil (Manet), a painting by Édouard Manet
  - Argenteuil Basin with a Single Sailboat, a painting by French Impressionist artist Claude Monet
