= Cantons of the Val-d'Oise department =

The following is a list of the 21 cantons of the Val-d'Oise department, in France, following the French canton reorganisation which came into effect in March 2015:

- Argenteuil-1
- Argenteuil-2
- Argenteuil-3
- Cergy-1
- Cergy-2
- Deuil-la-Barre
- Domont
- Ermont
- Fosses
- Franconville
- Garges-lès-Gonesse
- Goussainville
- Herblay-sur-Seine
- L'Isle-Adam
- Montmorency
- Pontoise
- Saint-Ouen-l'Aumône
- Sarcelles
- Taverny
- Vauréal
- Villiers-le-Bel
