= CDFA (disambiguation) =

CDFA is the California Department of Food and Agriculture.

CDFA may also refer to:

- Community Development Finance Association
- CDFA, an entertainment distribution subsidiary of Shock Records
- CDFA, Faoileann Records catalogue numbers for Shaskeen

== See also ==
- Chief of the Defence Force (Australia)
- CDFAS sports centre in Val d'Oise, France
- Archive of the Congregation for the Doctrine of the Faith (ACDF)
- Council of Fashion Designers of America (CFDA)
