= Saint-Gratien =

Saint-Gratien ("Saint Gratian") may refer to the following locales in France:

- Saint-Gratien, Somme
- Saint-Gratien, Val-d'Oise
  - Saint-Gratien (Paris RER), a railway station in Saint-Gratien, Val-d'Oise
- Saint-Gratien-Savigny, in the Nièvre département
