= Arrondissements of the Val-d'Oise department =

Administrative divisions of Val-d'Oise, France

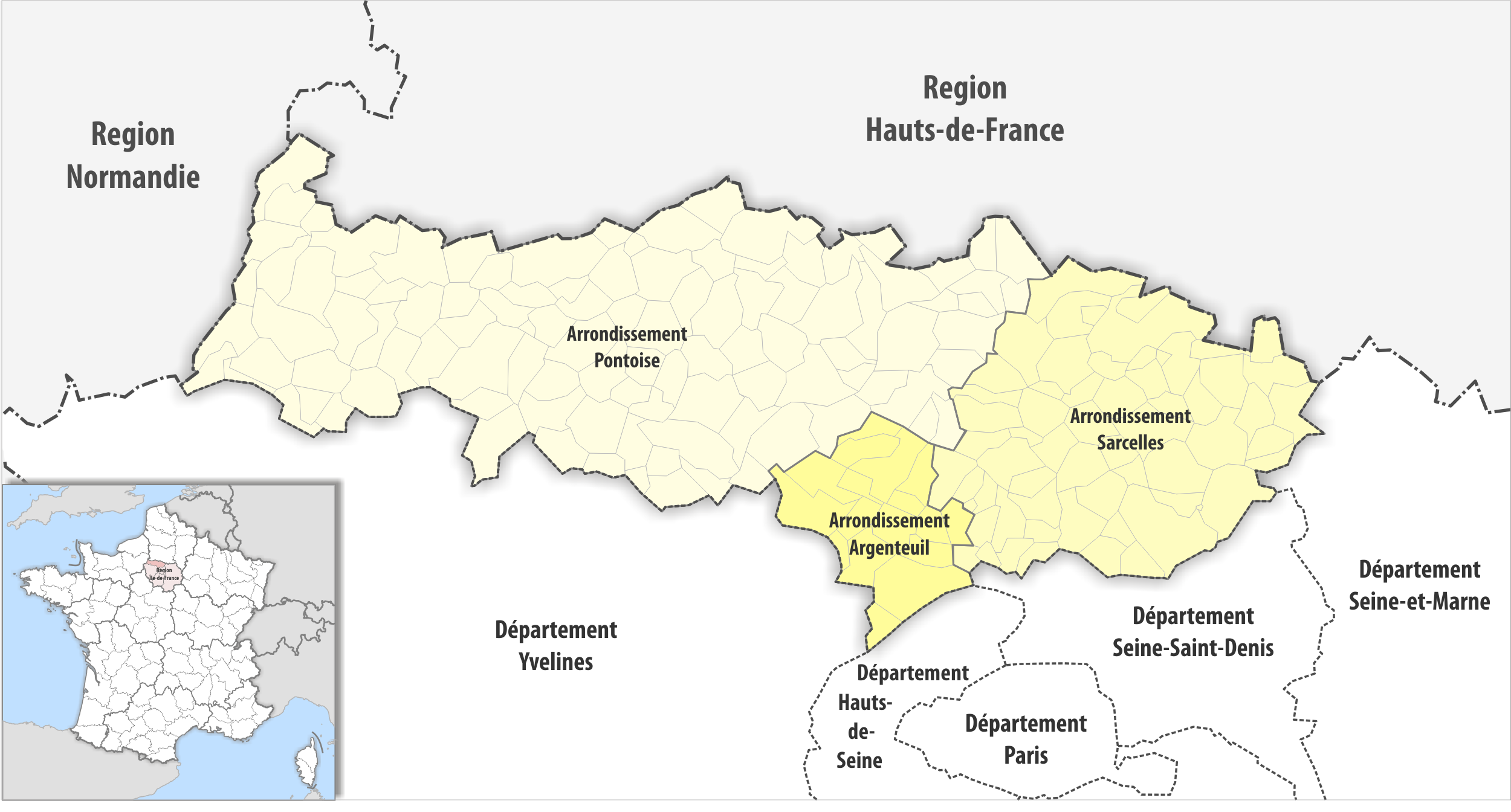
Map of arrondissements of the Val-d'Oise department.

The 3 arrondissements of the Val-d'Oise department are:

1. Arrondissement of Argenteuil, (subprefecture: Argenteuil) with 17 communes. The population of the arrondissement was 425,515 in 2021.
2. Arrondissement of Pontoise, (prefecture of the Val-d'Oise department: Pontoise) with 105 communes. The population of the arrondissement was 349,407 in 2021.
3. Arrondissement of Sarcelles, (subprefecture: Sarcelles) with 62 communes. The population of the arrondissement was 481,685 in 2021.

== History ==
As parts of the department Seine-et-Oise, the arrondissement of Pontoise was established in 1800, the arrondissement of Montmorency in 1962 and the arrondissement of Argenteuil in 1966. In 1968 the department Val-d'Oise was created from part of the former department Seine-et-Oise, and the arrondissements of Pontoise, Argenteuil and Montmorency became part of it. In March 2000 Sarcelles replaced Montmorency as subprefecture.

The borders of the arrondissements of Val-d'Oise were modified in January 2017:

- 10 communes from the arrondissement of Pontoise to the arrondissement of Argenteuil
- two communes from the arrondissement of Pontoise to the arrondissement of Sarcelles
- one commune from the arrondissement of Sarcelles to the arrondissement of Pontoise
