= Hôtel de Ville, Argenteuil =

Town hall in Argenteuil, France

Hôtel de Ville
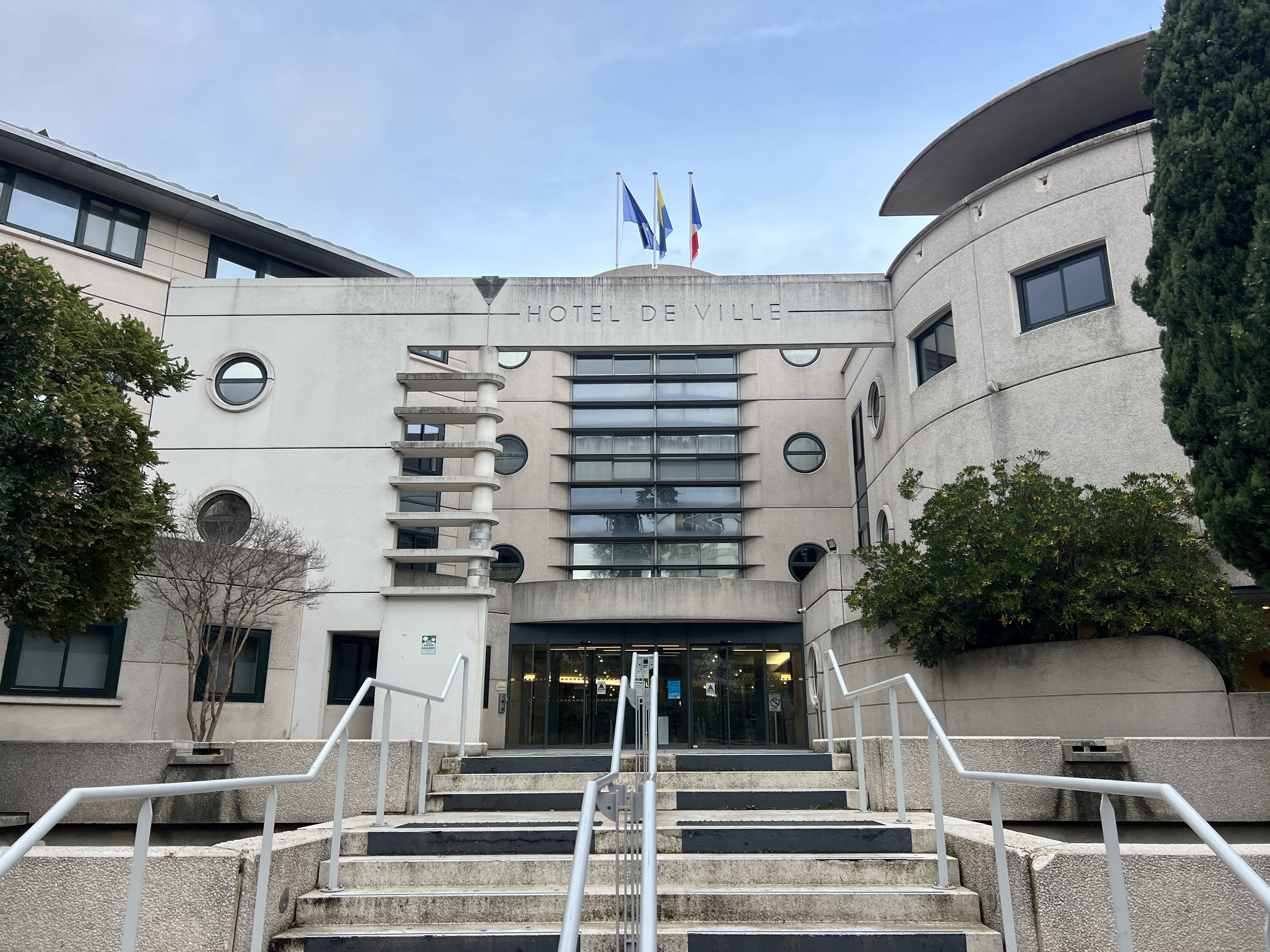
- The main frontage of the Hôtel de Ville in November 2023
- Interactive map of the Hôtel de Ville area

General information
- Type: City hall
- Architectural style: Modern style
- Location: Argenteuil, France
- Coordinates: 48.9479°N 2.2489°E
- Completed: 1994

Design and construction
- Architect: Eric Van Bellinghen

The Hôtel de Ville (French pronunciation: [otɛl də vil], City Hall) is a municipal building in Argenteuil, Val-d'Oise, in the northwestern suburbs of Paris, standing on Boulevard Léon Feix.

== History ==
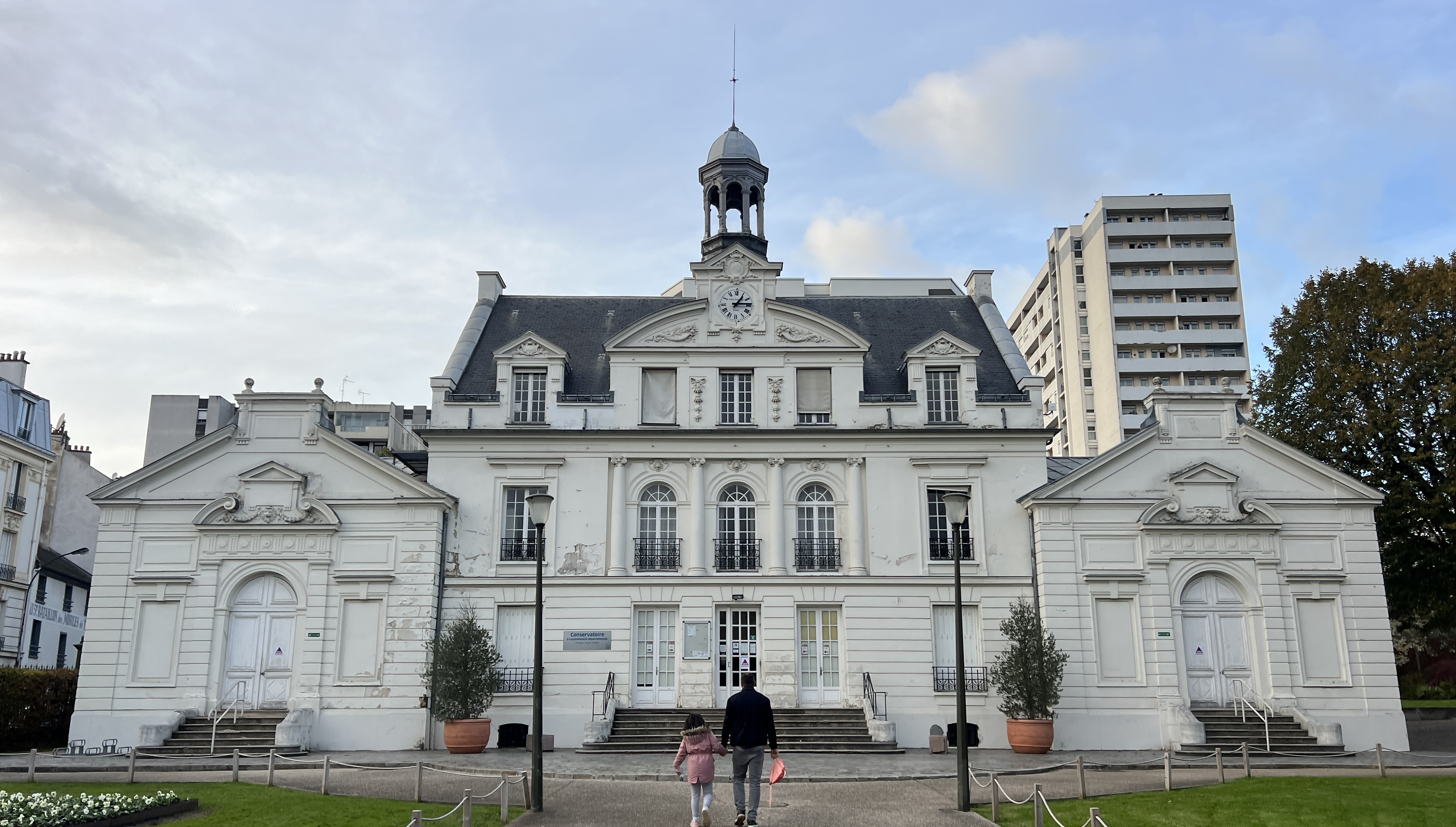
The old town hall on Boulevard Héloïse

Under the Ancien régime, members of the local civic assembly met in a room near the Basilica of Saint-Denis. Following the French Revolution, the new town council initially used the offices of a local tailor, Sieur Branchu, from 1789 and then the home of Jean-François Aubry from 1791. In 1794, they acquired a Benedictine Priory on Rue de la Chaussée, which had been abandoned when the friars had been driven out during the revolution. After the old priory became dilapidated, the council acquired the former home of an officer in the Swiss Guard, Louis-François Schwitzer, on Quai de Seine in 1836.

After the building on Quai de Seine also became dilapidated, the council decided to commission a purpose-built town hall and bought a site on Boulevard Héloïse. The new building was designed in the neoclassical style, built in brick with a cement render and was officially opened by the Minister of Agriculture, Albert Viger, on 4 June 1899. The design involved a symmetrical main frontage of five bays facing onto Boulevard Héloïse. The central section of three bays featured three doorways on the ground floor, three round headed windows separated by Corinthian order columns on the first floor, and three casement windows at attic level, all surmounted by a curved pediment containing a clock. A bust depicting Marianne was installed on a pedestal in front of the building.

After the Second World War, the town was awarded the Croix de Guerre, in recognition of the extensive bombing of the area, and the medal was placed on display in the town hall. In the early 1960s, the council decided to commission modern offices. The site they selected was land on Boulevard d'Alsace-Lorraine (now Boulevard Léon-Feix), which belonged to the Bayard-Joly family, who had lived nearby in Rue Paul-Vaillant-Couturier, before giving their home to the Red Cross. The new building was designed by Paul Cordonnier in the modern style, built in brick with a cement render finish and was officially opened on 16 August 1966.

However, by the late 1980s, the building had become too cramped, and the council decided to demolish it and to commission a new building on the same site. The new building was designed by Eric Van Bellinghen in the modern style, built in reinforced concrete and glass, and was officially opened in 1994.

The layout involved a narrow main frontage facing onto Boulevard Léon Feix and a long side elevation adjacent to Rue Denis Roy. The main access was at the southwest corner of the building: it featured a short flight of steps, and passed through an opening in a concrete screen, with the inscription Hôtel de Ville above and two oculi and a banded column on the left. Beyond the screen, there was a glass doorway with a curved canopy on the ground floor, and a large casement window with slats, flanked by three oculi on each side, on the first floor. Internally, the principal rooms were the entrance hall and the main auditorium intended for public meetings. A car, built at the local Lorraine-Dietrich factory in 1910, was subsequently placed on display in the entrance hall.
