= Hôtel de Ville, Saint-Gratien =

Town hall in Saint-Gratien, France

Hôtel de Ville
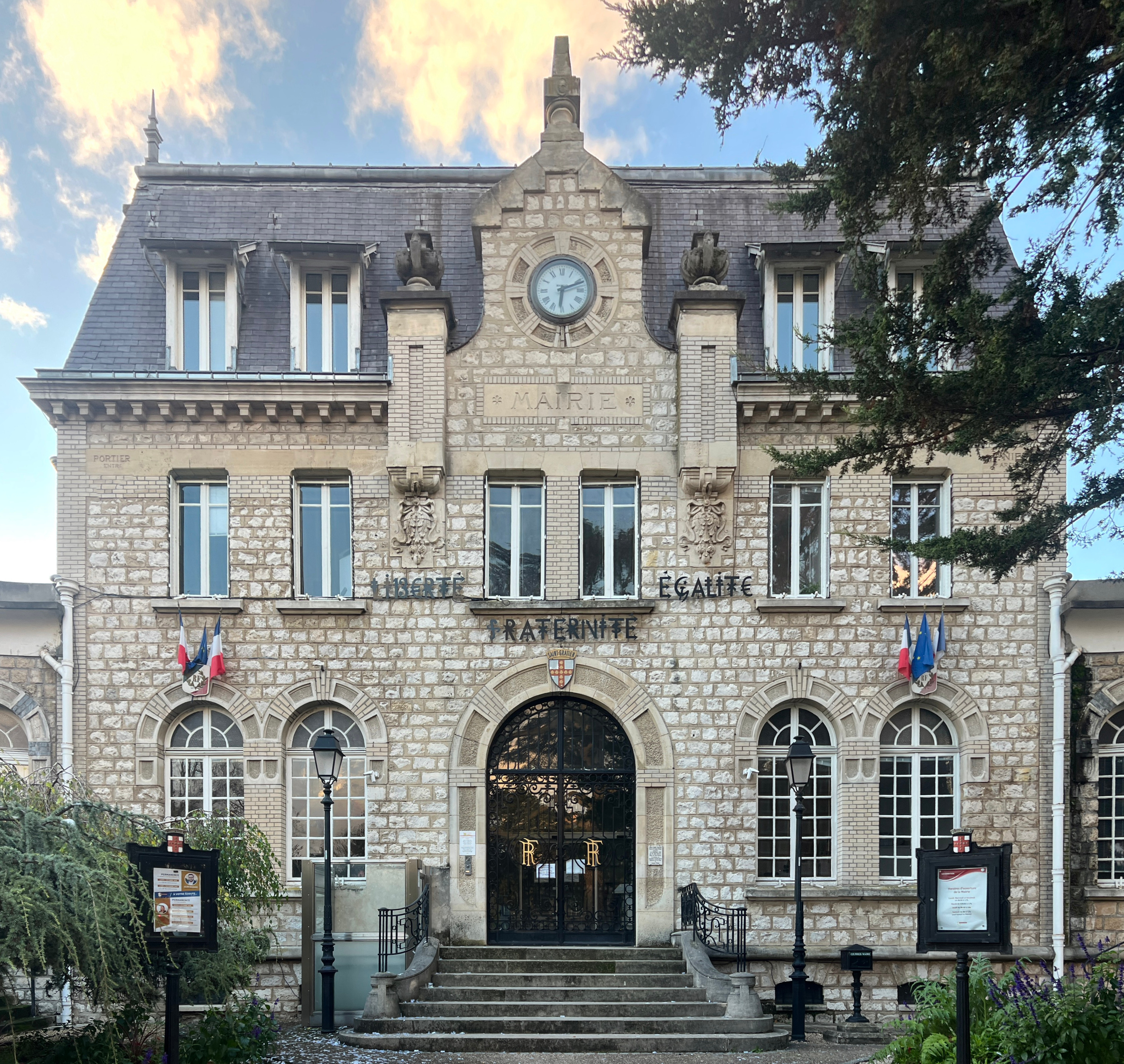
- The main frontage of the Hôtel de Ville in October 2024
- Interactive map of the Hôtel de Ville area

General information
- Type: City hall
- Architectural style: Neoclassical style
- Location: Saint-Gratien, France
- Coordinates: 48.9707°N 2.2832°E
- Completed: 1909

Design and construction
- Architect: Paul Nief

The Hôtel de Ville (French pronunciation: [otɛl də vil], City Hall) is a municipal building in Saint-Gratien, Val-d'Oise, in the northern suburbs of Paris, standing on Place Gambetta.

== History ==
Following the French Revolution, the new town council initially met in the house of the mayor at the time. This arrangement continued until 1861, when Princess Mathilde Bonaparte decided to enlarge an existing school building on Rue Pierre Hémonnot to create a combined town hall and school. The princess had taken up residence at Château Neuf (now Château de la Princesse Mathilde) in the mid-19th century, and a portrait of her by Eugène Giraud was donated to the council by the princess's nephew, Louis-Napoleon Bonaparte, in February 1904.

In the early 20th century, following significant population growth, the council led by the mayor, Charles Grusse-Dagneaux, decided to commission a new town hall. The site they selected, on the southeast side of what is now Boulevard de la République, was donated to them by the Société Immobilière de la Banlieue de Paris (Property Company of the Suburbs of Paris). The donation of land also facilitated the development of a school, the École élémentaire Grusse Dagneaux. The new town hall was designed by Paul Nief in the neoclassical style, built in rubble masonry and was officially opened by the Under-Secretary of State for War, Henry Chéron, on 7 February 1909.

The design involved a symmetrical main frontage of five bays facing onto Place Gambetta. The central bay featured a large round-headed doorway with an ornate surround on the ground floor, a pair of casement windows on the first floor and a clock above. The clock was flanked by pilasters, which were projected forward on corbels and surmounted by sculptures. The outer bays were fenestrated by closely set round-headed windows with ornate surrounds on the ground floor, by casement windows on the first floor, and by dormer windows at attic level. Single storey wings, which curved forward on the outside, were added in 1936. Internally, the principal room was the Salle des mariages (wedding room).

In 1943, during the Second World War, the council chamber was decorated with fine murals, which were painted under the direction of Ivan Bottiau and depicted scenes involving the military leader, Marshal Nicolas Catinat, and the salonnière, Princess Mathilde Bonaparte. A war memorial, in the form of a sculpture of a soldier with a woman at his feet, which had been created by the sculptor, Ernest Diosi, was relocated from Place de la Victoire to the park in front of the town hall in 1960.
