= Stephane-Diagana Athletic Hall =

French sports stadium in Lyon

Halle d'athlétisme
- Stéphane-Diagana
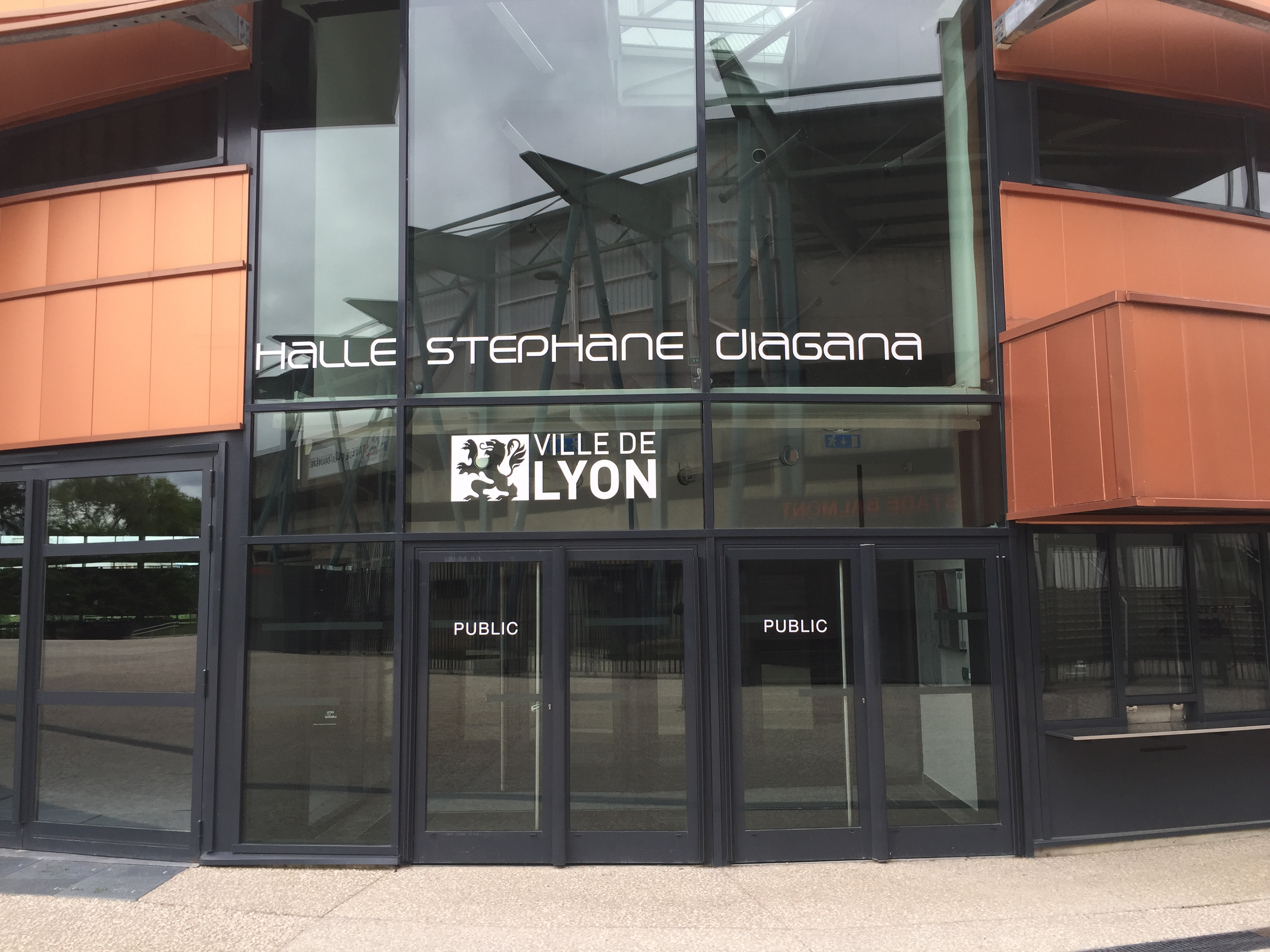
- View of the Hall in May 2015.

- Location within France
- Address: 4 rue Victor-Schœlcher; 69009 Lyon, France
- Coordinates: 45.7872°N 4.7958°E
- Owner: Ville de Lyon
- Capacity: 2000 spectators
- Surface: 11,700 m^{2} (126,000 sq ft)
- Field size: 120 m × 70 m × 15 m (394 ft × 230 ft × 49 ft)

Construction
- Opened: October 2012; Inauguration 9 November 2012
- Cost: €25 million
- Architects: Chabanne & Partenaires

The Stéphane Diagana athletics Hall or Lyon Duchère athletics Hall is an indoor stadium of athletics located in the quarter of fr:La Duchère near the Stadium of La Duchère in Lyon, France. Opened in October 2012 it was inaugurated on 9 November 2012. It is named after the French athlete Stéphane Diagana.

In 2015, the hall was the reception point of the World Masters Athletics Championships taking place in different places in the city of Lyon and bringing together nearly 800 athletes from 114 different countries.

== Construction ==
The hall was designed by the architectural firm Chabanne & Partenaires and project management was provided by City of Lyon. Manufacturers and service providers were: Ephren Engineering for the structure, Tecsol for solar energy and Terao for high environmental quality. In terms of energy, 69% of energy needs are assured by the use of renewable energy. Building dimensions of 120m by 70m by 15m

The overall cost was estimated at 12.8 million euros duty-free. With taxes included, the cost was 25 million euros paid by: the city of Lyon (38%), the region Rhône-Alpes (26%), the Grand Lyon (12%), the department Rhône (12%), the National Agency for Urban Renewal (6%) and the national center for the development of sport (6%). In 2006, the budget forecast was announced at around 18 million euros.

== Description ==
The total area is 11,700m^{2} for a footprint of 7,800m^{2}. The field for athletics itself has a surface 6,400m^{2}

The 60 meters sprint track has eight lanes and the (circular)track of 200 meters has six lanes The hall has areas dedicated to Long jump, high jump, Pole vault and shot put

== Inauguration ==
The hall was inaugurated on 9 November 2012 in the presence of Stéphane Diagana, the Minister for Sport Valérie Fourneyron, Gérard Collomb as the mayor of Lyons, Jean-Jack Queyranne as President of the Regional Council and Michel Mercier as President of the Rhône department. The athletics meeting organized on this occasion, featured both Renaud Lavillenie and Christophe Lemaitre

In January 2012, An elected official of Lyon, Nathalie Perrin-Gilbert, expressed his preference for another name to baptize the sports arena; in this case the Lyon vaulter Pierre Quinon.

== Competitions welcomed ==
- February 2013 : French University athletics championships.
- March 2013 : Cadets and Junior France athletics championships.
- February 2014 : Disabled France Athletics Championships in disabled.
- January 2015 : Interregional athletics championships.
- August 2015 : World Masters Athletic Championships.

== See also ==
- CDFAS
