= CDFAS =

Sport complex in France

Centre départemental de formation en activités sportives(CDFAS)
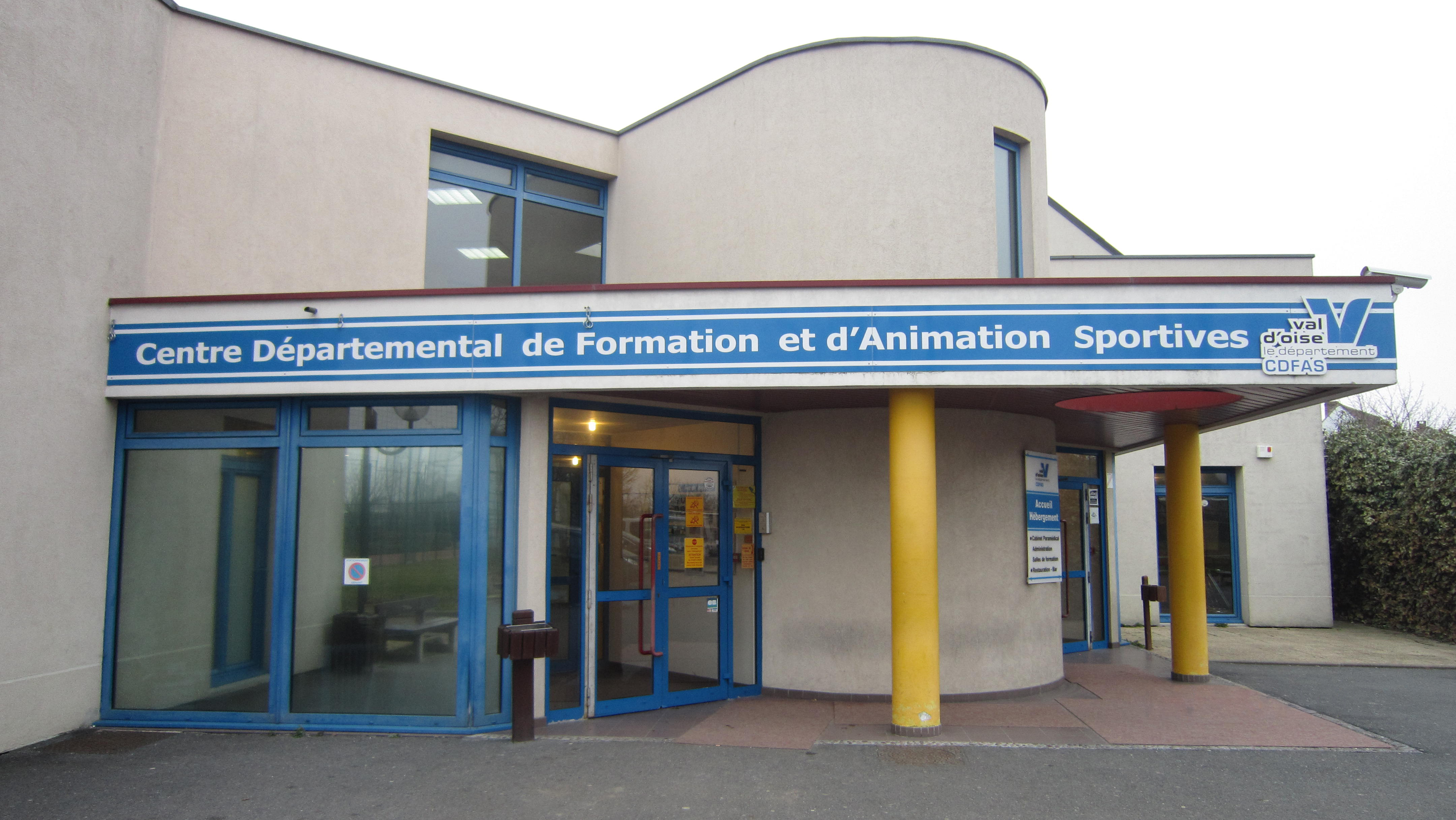

- Location within France
- Address: 64 rue des Bouquinvilles; 95600 Eaubonne
- Coordinates: 48.977°N 2.276°E
- Owner: Conseil général du Val d'Oise
- Surface: 17,400 m^{2} (187,000 sq ft)

Construction
- Built: 1993-1995

The Central Departmental training sports and entertainment complex (CDFAS) is a sports complex located in the Val d'Oise in the communes of Eaubonne and of Saint-Gratien. Built in a park of seven hectares, it was constructed by the general Council with the help of the Region Ile-de-France and is managed by a public service delegation. During the 2024 Summer Olympics, team USA used CDFAS as a base.

== Overview ==
=== Funding ===
The Centre départementale de formation et d'animation sportive (CDFA) contains 17,400 m^{2} (187,000 sq ft) of building built on 7 hectares (17 acres) of green space for a total cost of 178 million francs (land 25 million, 144 million for work and building studies, equipment 9 million). The funding came from:

- General Council of the Val-d'Oise 148 million francs (83%);
- Regional Council of Ile-de-France: CHF 30 million (17%).

=== Description ===
The CDFA was constructed in two stages in the first half of the 1990s. Buildings constructed in 1993 are:

- the Jean Bouvelle House in which are the offices of sports departmental committees, those of the Olympic and Sport departmental committee (CDOS) and a conference room in three modular classrooms

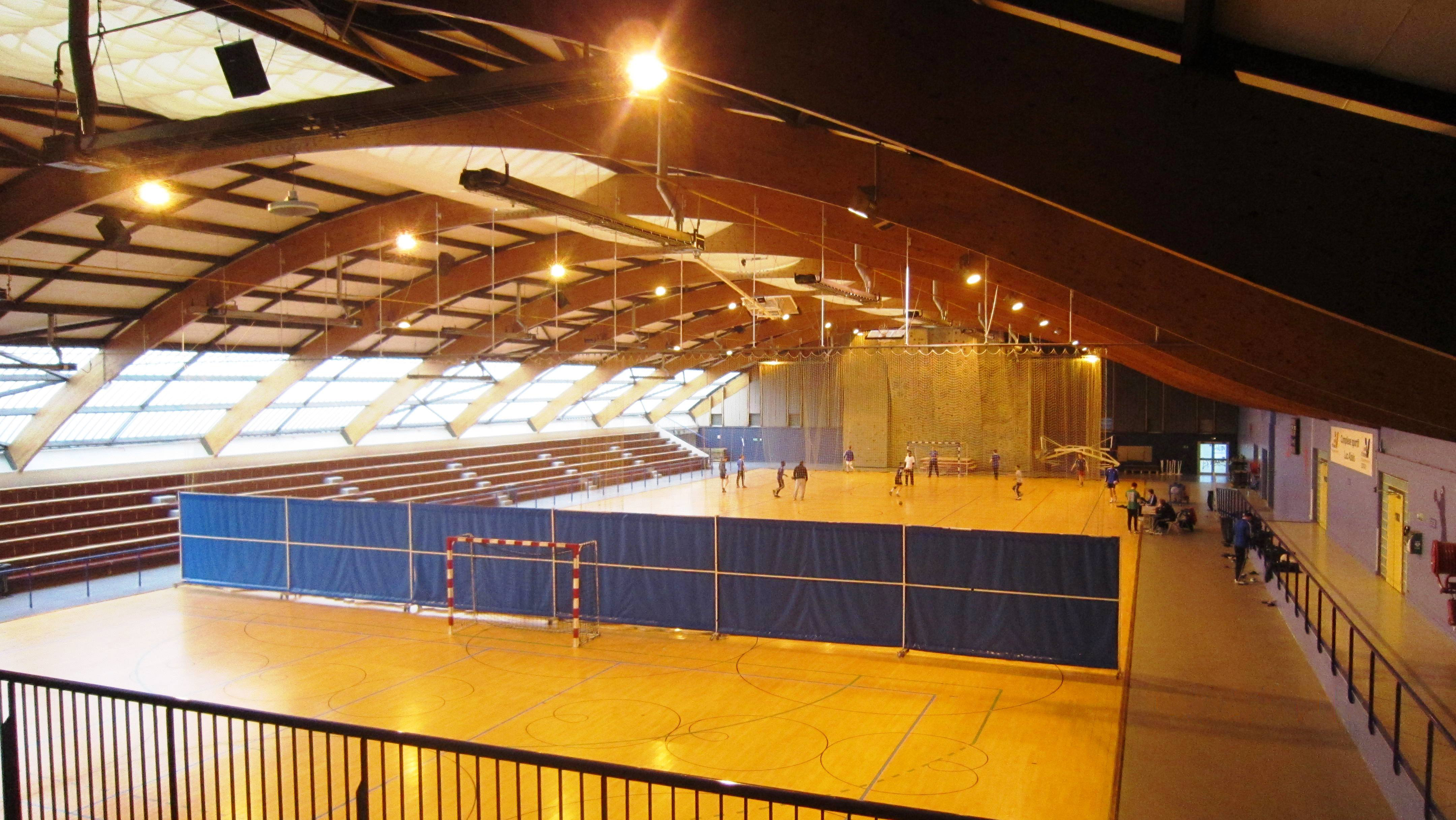
Luc Abalo Room (interior)

- the sports complex includes a sports hall 2,600 m^{2} (28,000 sq ft) dedicated to Luc Abalo with stands and a climbing wall, another 1,000 m^{2} (11,000 sq ft) is for a specialized gymnastics room, a weight room, a boxing ring, a dojo of 655 m^{2} (7,050 sq ft), a classroom and a meeting room.

The second phase of construction was completed in late 1995. It consists of:

- the indoor stadium of athletics (3,000 m^{2} or 32,000 sq ft track space) dedicated to Stéphane Diagana with its annexes (a warm room of 600 m^{2} (6,500 sq ft), a press room, forums, ...) with a total area of 5,000 m^{2} (54,000 sq ft);

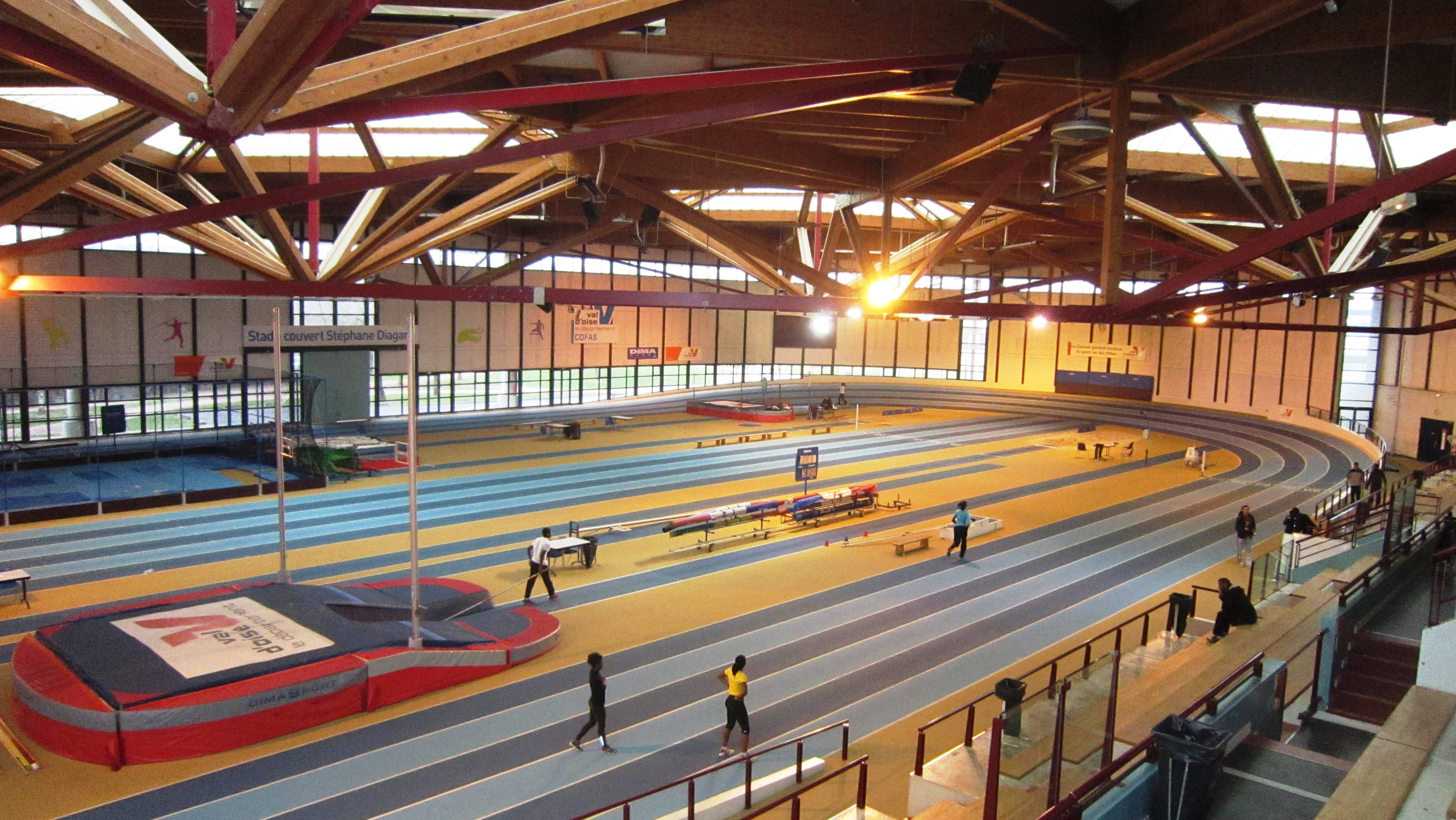
Stade Stéphane Diagana (interior)

- the visitor center including administrative offices, boarding, space and catering kitchen, classrooms and meetings and local sports medicine with sauna.
- outdoor sports facilities: fields for rugby, American Football, fields for lancers, for tennis and indoor parking.
- The Stadium Michel Hidalgo and a intercommunal pool of Bussys complete the complex. The structure is a very versatile sporting complex, meeting the needs of the sporting world for training camps or training for demonstrations, seminars, and conferences.

=== Management and administration ===
The General Council of Val d'Oise delegates management of the CDFA by tender. The current beneficiary is an association called CDFAS Management Association. The administration is under the authority of a director. The administrative, technical and maintenance are provided by 32 other budget items.

== Operation ==
The CDFA hosts occasional courses, permanent centers and major sports and / or media events.

=== Internships ===
The CDFA welcomes, as a priority, internships in the departmental committees of the Val d'Oise and leagues Ile-de-France but remains open to requests from national federations, international and other organizations; it also hosts events at the request of various organizations and businesses.

=== Centers ===
The CDFA currently hosts four under 21s regional training teams: Athletics (8 trainees in 2012), women's basketball (14 trainees in 2012), American football (14 trainees in 2012) and Handball (24 trainees in 2012). Young athletes are enrolled in local institutions with flexible hours allowing for practice and high-level training with federal coaches. They are under the permanent responsibility of 3 boarding masters.

=== The events ===
Major events are hosted at CDFA. It has hosted:

- several successive editions of the World Championships table football (foosball)
- the challenge Pierre Tiby, a European junior championship of handball held there regularly
- a traditional indoor international athletics meeting. (Since 2012 that meeting has given way to the first edition of the female track meet of Val d'Oise, a meeting of international women's only athletics).

== The CDFA in a few numbers ==
In 2012, 197,578 spectators have attended CDFAS events, for 38,831 hours facilities were in use, 64,149 meals have been served and 28,973 overnight accommodations provided. For the same year the budget was 3,688,916 € of which 1,832,807 came from the General Council.

== See also ==
Another Athletic Hall by the name of Stephane-Diagana in Lyon
