= The Artist's House at Argenteuil =

1873 painting by Claude Monet

Coordinates: 48°56′44.2″N 2°15′26.6″E

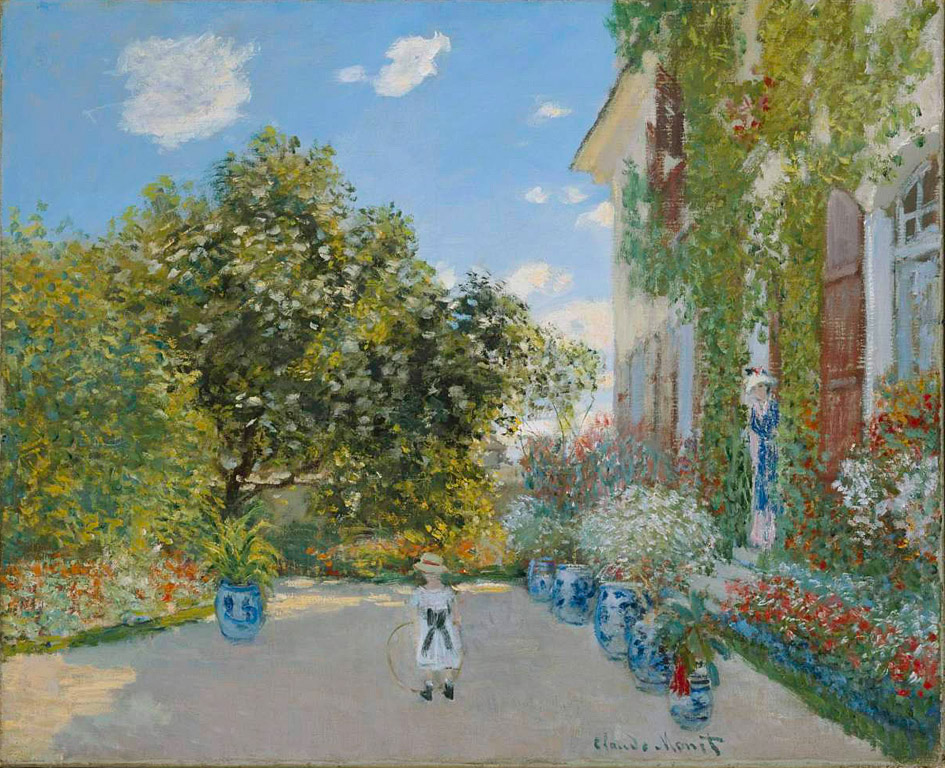
- Artist: Claude Monet
- Year: 1873
- Medium: Oil on canvas
- Dimensions: 73.3 cm × 60.2 cm (28.9 in × 23.7 in)
- Location: Art Institute of Chicago

The Artist's House at Argenteuil (French: Maison de l'artiste à Argenteuil) is an 1873 oil painting by French artist Claude Monet. The work depicts his wife Camille and their young son Jean in the garden at their house in Argenteuil. It is an uncommon painting by Monet of his family in a domestic scene at their home, and was painted in a place and time that represented the "birth of Impressionism."

The painting is in the collection of the Art Institute of Chicago.

== Background ==
Claude Monet lived in a rented house in the Paris suburb of Argenteuil for seven years, from 1871-1878, together with his wife Camille and their young son Jean. Argenteuil has been called "the single most important site for the birth of impressionism," not only because of Monet's work there, but because he was joined at times by some of the most famous painters of the day: Auguste Renoir, Édouard Manet, and Alfred Sisley, among others, who together with Monet developed the classic impressionist style. An exhibit in April 1874 organized by the painters was the basis of the term Impressionism and "brought Impressionism to its zenith", according to Monet biographer Daniel Wildenstein.

The year 1873 was a period of relative financial stability for Monet. The rented house in Argenteuil had three stories and a garden covering roughly 2/3 of an acre or 2,662 m^{2} (28,650 sq ft). Monet was earning enough to employ a gardener and two domestic servants. He and Camille had been married not long before, in 1870, and at the time of the painting, Jean was probably five.

Monet produced at least 150 pictures of Argenteuil or its surroundings during his time there. The great majority of his paintings of the period were of river views, railway bridges, boats, fields, and factories. The Artist's House at Argenteuil is a rare painting that depicts his wife and son in domestic life at the house itself. Camille Monet died six years later, in 1879, at the age of 32.

The painting has been in the possession of the Art Institute of Chicago since 1933.

== Composition ==
The painting depicts Monet's large garden behind the house. Jean plays with a hoop on a large expanse of sand (compacted stone crushed to powder) in the foreground, while Camille looks on from an open doorway. The child is the focal point of the composition. Surrounding him are lush circular flower beds, the gardens framing the house, and a variety of flowering plants in large blue vases. The effect is a comforting secluded garden, and the mid-summer harmony of upscale family life.

Monet changed the composition from initial versions. Infrared examination by the Art Institute of Chicago showed that Jean was initially painted in a seated position to the right of his current location, perhaps in a cart or on a hobbyhorse, among objects that appear to be toys. At some point Monet also eliminated a pot, which had been next to the now single container to the left of the boy. This more directly aligns Jean as the main focal point within a diagonal formed by the pots, almost as if on a stage.

The painting is representative of the breakout works from Argenteuil in the 1870s, in which the subtle interaction of flora, light, and color gave intimacy and warmth to scenes of everyday life.

== House as museum ==
The house in Argenteuil is a Monet museum today, located at 21 Boulevard Karl Marx, featuring many of the works of the period. The house has served as a museum since September, 2022. The top floor of the museum is a reconstruction of the "Studio Boat" that Monet used as an atelier that was docked on the Seine.

== See also ==
- List of paintings by Claude Monet

== Sources ==
- Wildenstein, Deniel (1996). Monet, or the Triumph of Impressionism. Köln: TASCHEN. ISBN 978-3836590839.
