= Saint-Gratien station =

Railway station in Saint-Gratien, France

Saint-Gratien
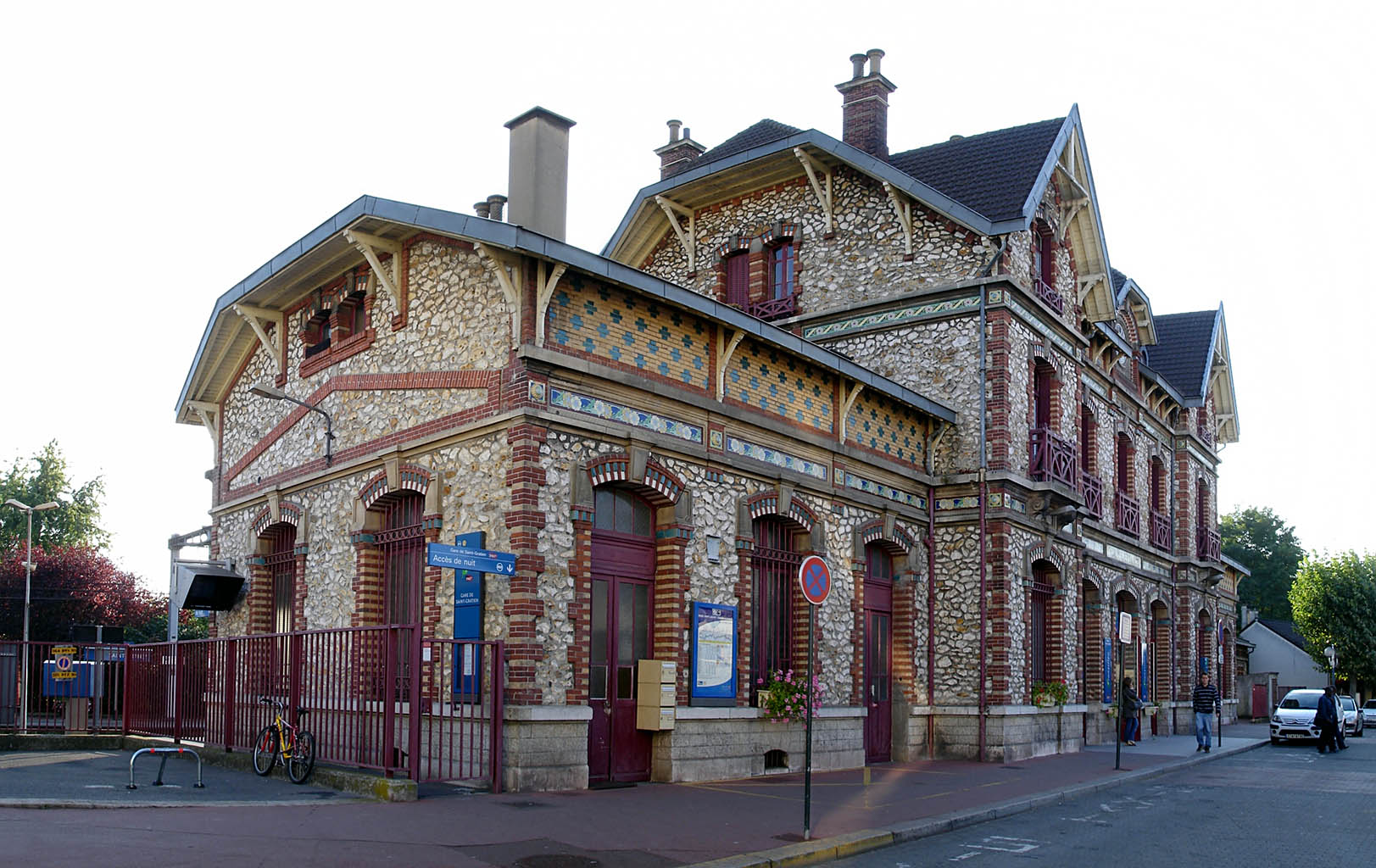

General information
- Location: Rue de Verdun; 95210 Saint-Gratien, France
- Coordinates: 48.963826°N 2.28514°E
- Owner: SNCF
- Line: RER C
- Platforms: 2 outside
- Tracks: 2

Construction
- Accessible: Yes, by prior reservation

Other information
- Station code: 87276170
- Fare zone: 4

Passengers
- 2024: 2,576,869

Services
Preceding station	RER	Following station
Ermont-Eaubonne towards Pontoise	RER C	Épinay-sur-Seine towards Massy-Palaiseau or Dourdan-la-Forêt
Location

The RER station Saint-Gratien is a railway station in the commune of Saint-Gratien, Val-d’Oise department, France.

== The station ==
The station was built by the Nord company in 1906 and opened in 1908 when the extension to St. Gratien and Ermont was placed in service.

The station is served by trains on Branch C1 of the RER C.
