= Théméricourt =

- Commune
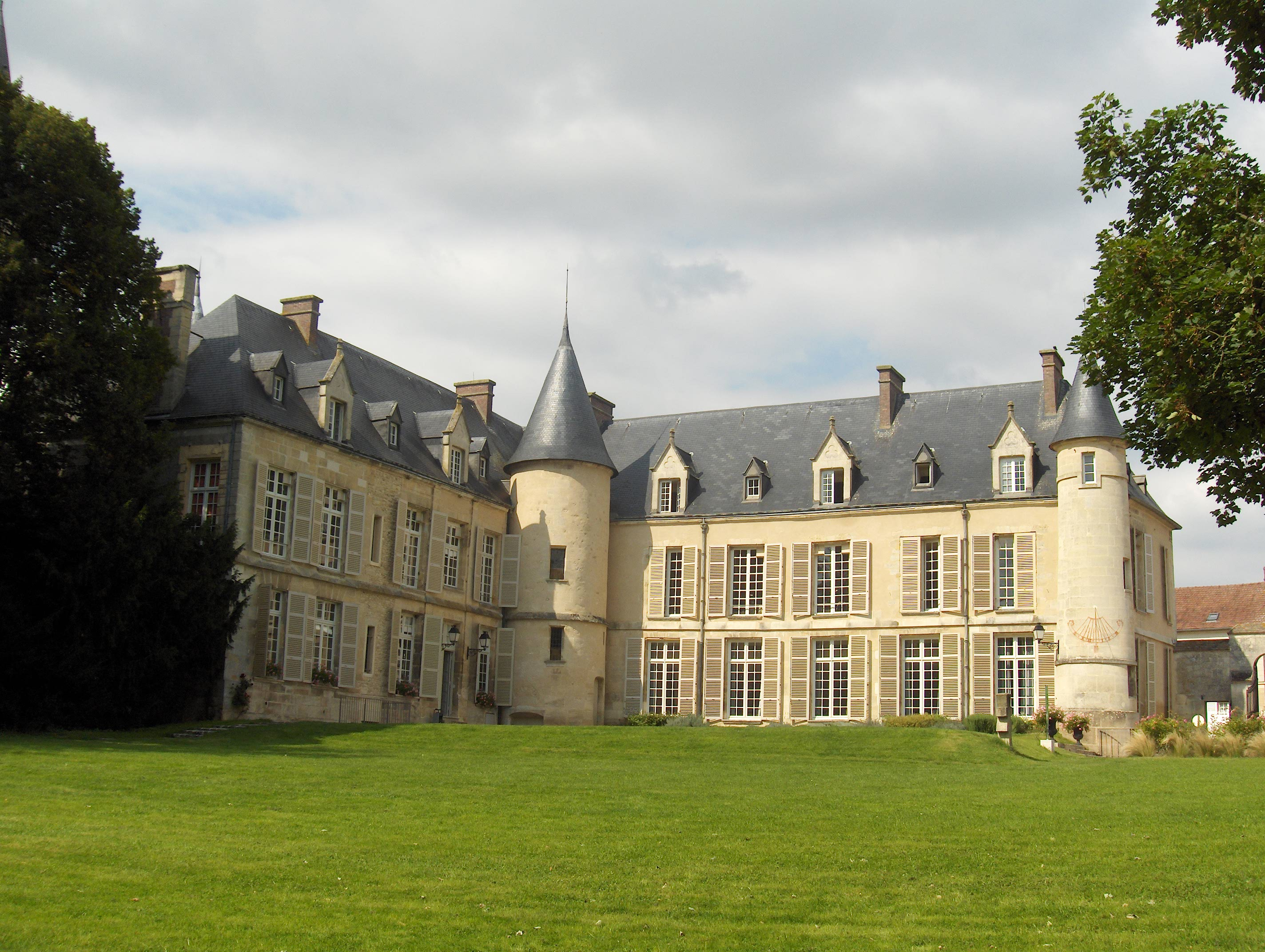
- The Château, housing the Vexin français museum

- Coat of arms
- Location of Théméricourt
- Location within France Location within Île-de-France (region)
- Coordinates: 49°05′14″N 1°53′50″E
- Country: France
- Region: Île-de-France
- Department: Val-d'Oise
- Arrondissement: Pontoise
- Canton: Vauréal

Government
  - Mayor (2020–2026): Denis Sargeret
- Area^{1}: 7.58 km^{2} (2.93 sq mi)
- Highest elevation: 137 m (449 ft)
- Lowest elevation: 70 m (230 ft)
- Population (2023): 283
  - Density: 37.3/km^{2} (96.7/sq mi)
- Time zone: UTC+01:00 (CET)
  - Summer (DST): UTC+02:00 (CEST)
- INSEE/Postal code: 95610 /95450
- ^{1} French Land Register data, which excludes lakes, ponds, glaciers > 1 km^{2} (0.386 sq mi or 247 acres) and river estuaries.

Théméricourt (French pronunciation: [temeʁikuʁ]) is a commune in the Val-d'Oise department in Île-de-France in northern France.

== See also ==
- Communes of the Val-d'Oise department
