= Argenteuil Basin with a Single Sailboat =

1874 painting by Claude Monet

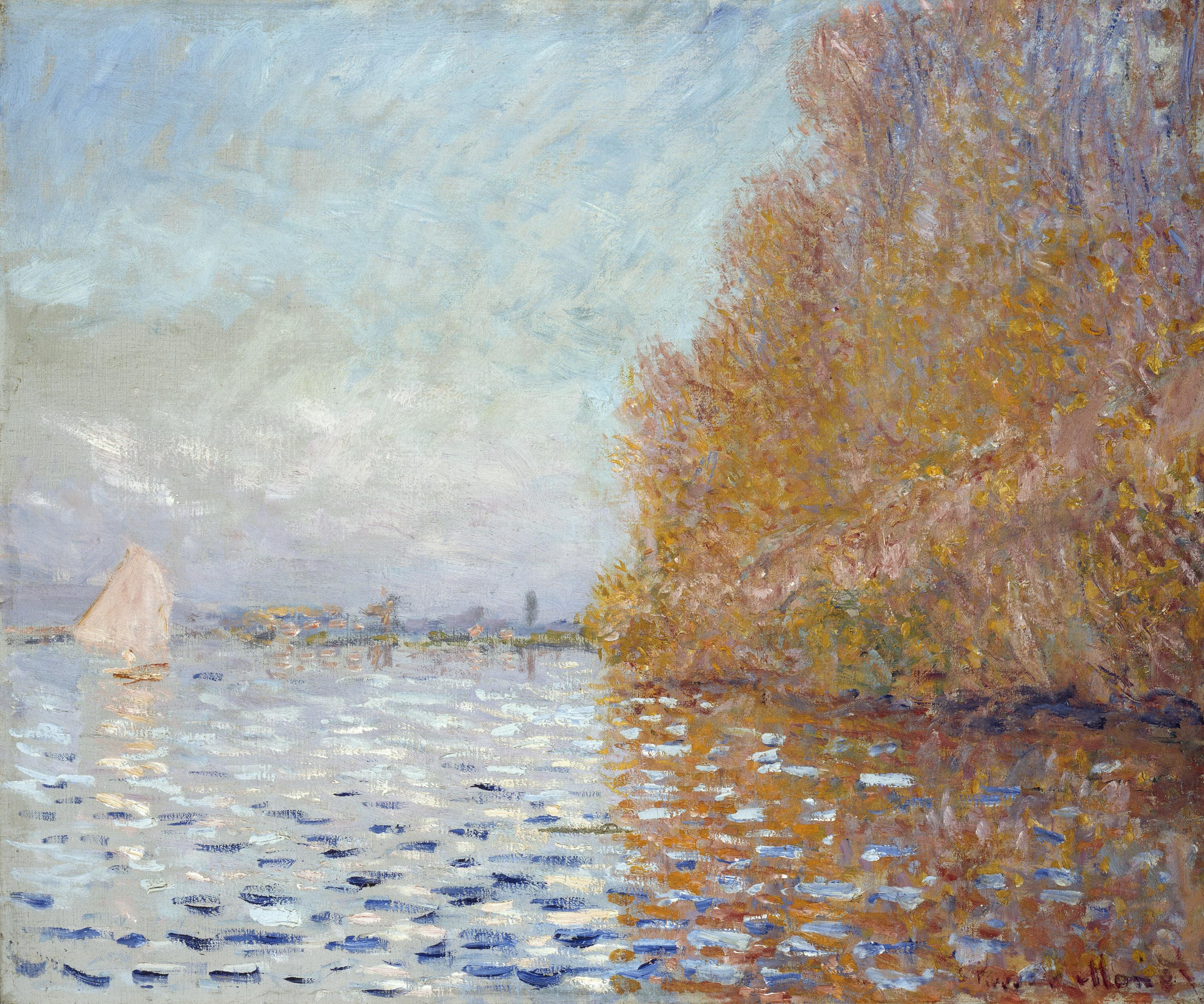
- Artist: Claude Monet
- Year: 1874
- Medium: Oil on canvas
- Dimensions: 55 cm × 65 cm (21.6 in × 25.6 in)
- Location: National Gallery of Ireland; Dublin, Ireland

Argenteuil Basin with a Single Sailboat (French: Bassin d'Argenteuil avec un seul voilier) is an oil on canvas autumn scene of the basin at Argenteuil, painted by French Impressionist artist Claude Monet in 1874.

== Creation ==
The piece was created during Monet's residence at Argenteuil, a town on the banks of the Seine, on the outskirts of Paris. Here Monet purchased a boat to be used as a floating studio and painted many scenes of the surrounding area.

== National Gallery of Ireland ==
The painting was purchased by Irish playwright and activist Edward Martyn in 1899, on the advice of his cousin, George Moore. It was bequeathed to the National Gallery of Ireland in 1924. It is valued at €10m.

=== Vandalism and restoration ===
At around 11am on 29 June 2012 a visitor to the gallery, Andrew Shannon, punched the painting causing "huge damage, shocking damage" with "an extensive three-branched tear".

After 18 months of restoration work, on 1 July 2014, the painting was re-hung in the gallery, behind protective glass. The restoration saw 7% of the damaged area being lost, in a process that involved sewing microscopic threads back together.

Shannon was jailed for 5 years for the attack.

== See also ==
- List of paintings by Claude Monet
