= Cécile Pelous =

French philanthropist and creative designer

Cécile Pelous is a French philanthropist and creative designer for couture houses in Paris. Pelous worked with some of the largest fashion brands including Dior, Lacroix, Nina Ricci, Yves Saint Laurent, and Galliano.

== Philanthropy ==
After writing a letter to Mother Teresa in 1989 and receiving a reply welcoming her help, Pelous went to Calcutta and worked with Teresa for five year. She worked with lepers and then later in Nepal she built a home for orphans. She financed the project by selling her home in France. She travels to India and Nepal several months a year between each fashion collection. She founded the association Action Autonomie Avenir to assist in her Nepal work. On January 30, 2010, she received the insignia of the Ordre national du Mérite.

== Personal life ==
She is an honorary citizen of the town of Argenteuil and a member of the Church of Jesus Christ of Latter-day Saints.
