= Saint-Gratien, Val-d'Oise =

Saint-Gratien
- Commune
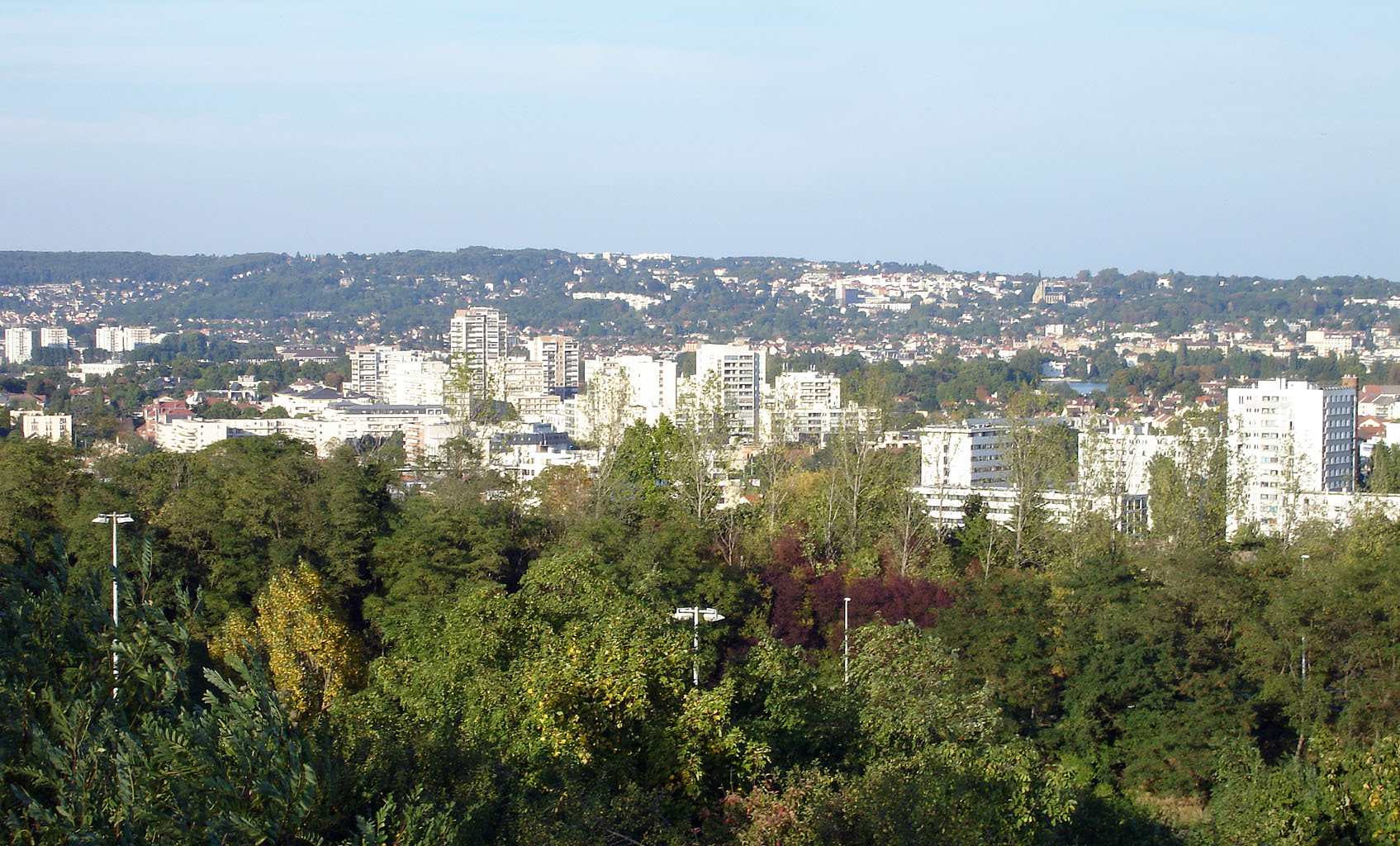
- A general view of Saint-Gratien from the Orgemont hill

- Coat of arms

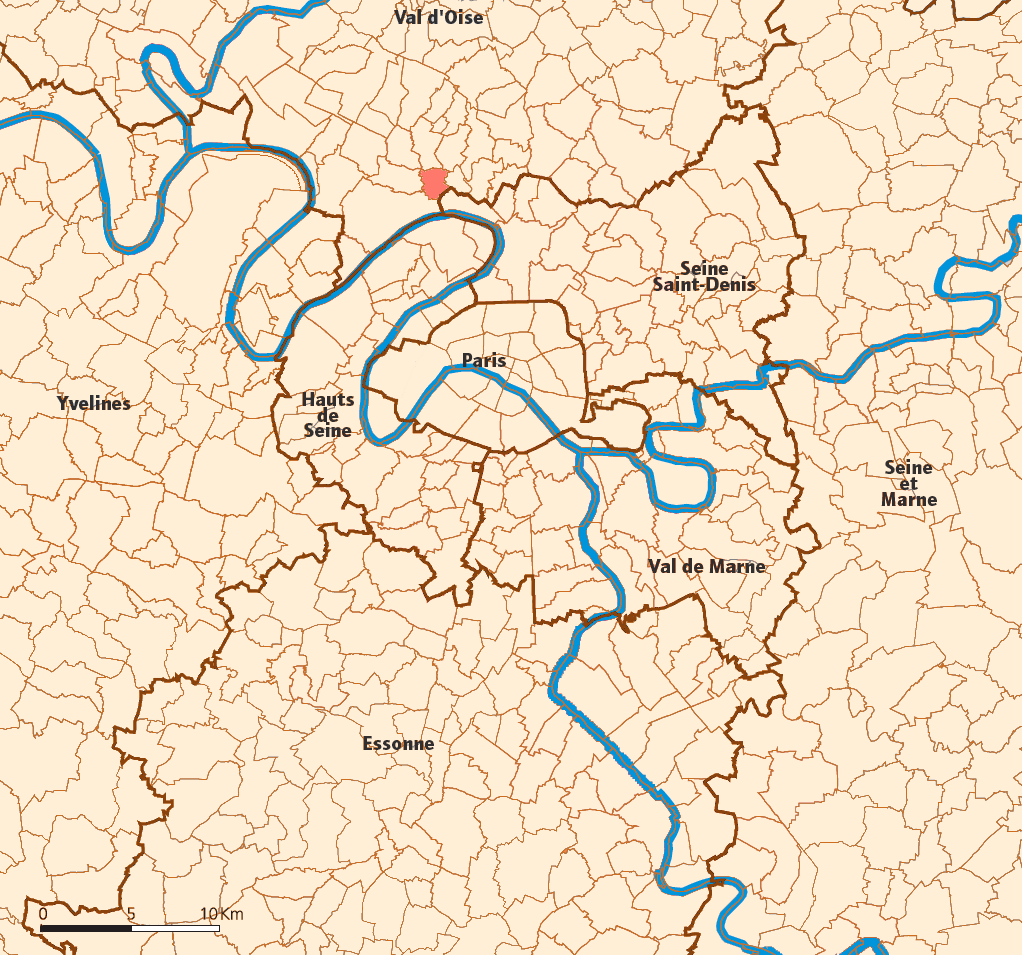
- Location (in red) within Paris inner and outer suburbs
- Location of Saint-Gratien
- Location within France Location within Île-de-France (region)
- Coordinates: 48°58′19″N 2°16′58″E
- Country: France
- Region: Île-de-France
- Department: Val-d'Oise
- Arrondissement: Sarcelles
- Canton: Argenteuil-1
- Intercommunality: CA Plaine Vallée

Government
  - Mayor (2020–2026): Julien Bachard
- Area^{1}: 2.42 km^{2} (0.93 sq mi)
- Population (2023): 21,336
  - Density: 8,820/km^{2} (22,800/sq mi)
- Time zone: UTC+01:00 (CET)
  - Summer (DST): UTC+02:00 (CEST)
- INSEE/Postal code: 95555 /95210
- ^{1} French Land Register data, which excludes lakes, ponds, glaciers > 1 km^{2} (0.386 sq mi or 247 acres) and river estuaries.

Saint-Gratien (French pronunciation: [sɛ̃ ɡʁasjɛ̃]) is a commune in the Val-d'Oise department, in the northern suburbs of Paris, France. It is located 13.8 km (8.6 mi) from the center of Paris.

== History ==
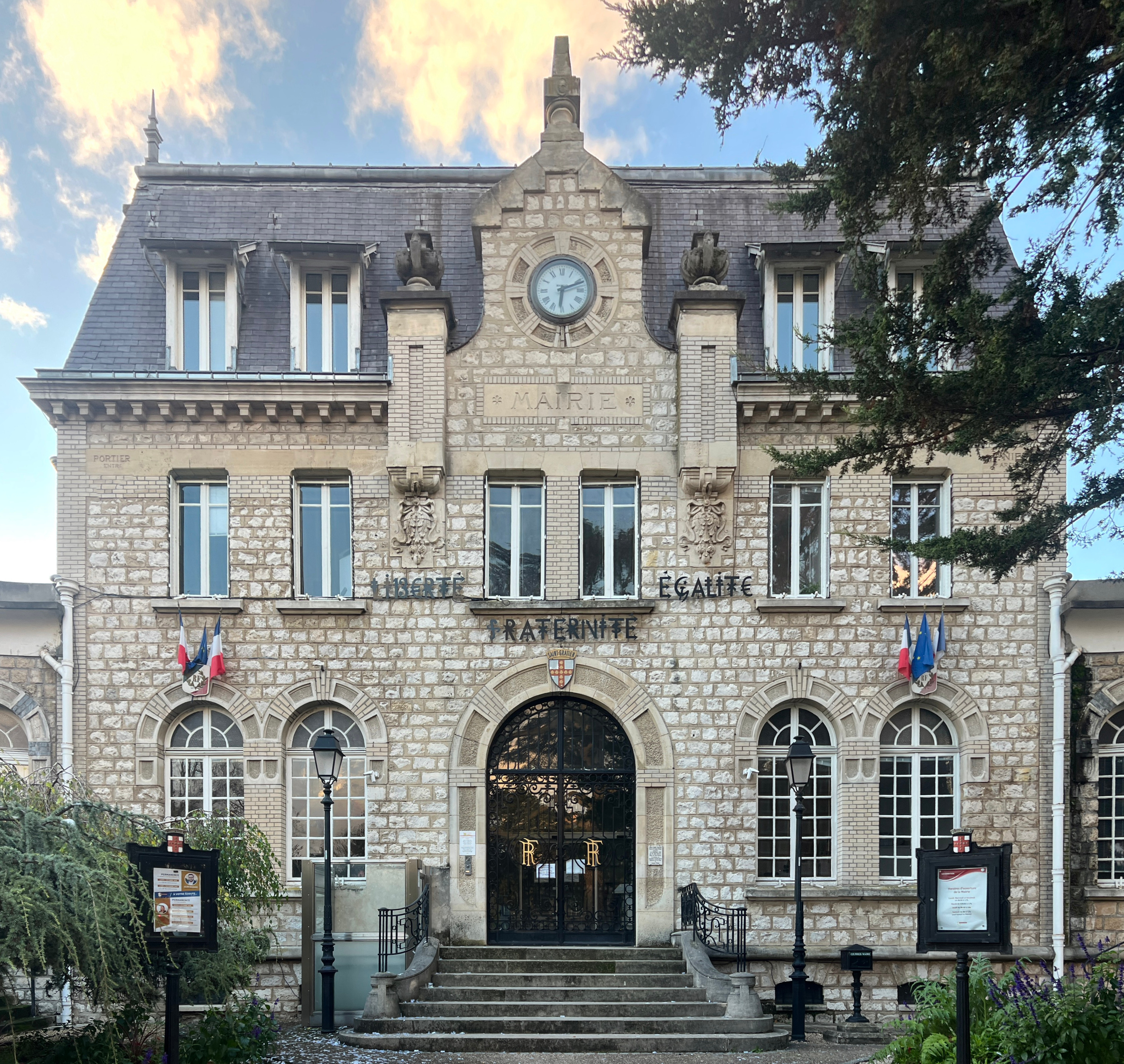
The Hôtel de Ville

On August 7, 1850, a part of the territory of Saint-Gratien was detached and merged with a part of the territory of Deuil-la-Barre, a part of the territory of Soisy-sous-Montmorency, and a part of the territory of Épinay-sur-Seine to create the commune of Enghien-les-Bains. On that occasion the commune of Saint-Gratien lost the scenic lake now known as the Lake of Enghien.

The Hôtel de Ville was completed in 1909.

== Population ==
Historical population

Year	Pop.	±% p.a.
1793	368	—
1821	380	+0.11%
1846	568	+1.62%
1856	720	+2.40%
1861	916	+4.93%
1866	1,046	+2.69%
1872	1,202	+2.34%
1876	1,241	+0.80%
1881	1,327	+1.35%
1886	1,656	+4.53%
1891	1,547	−1.35%
1896	1,632	+1.08%
1901	1,774	+1.68%
1906	2,091	+3.34%
1911	2,539	+3.96%
1921	3,307	+2.68%

Year	Pop.	±% p.a.
1926	4,485	+6.28%
1931	5,702	+4.92%
1936	5,847	+0.50%
1946	6,100	+0.42%
1954	7,204	+2.10%
1962	9,248	+3.17%
1968	14,947	+8.33%
1975	20,338	+4.50%
1982	20,470	+0.09%
1990	19,338	−0.71%
1999	19,226	−0.06%
2007	20,588	+0.86%
2012	20,937	+0.34%
2017	20,682	−0.24%
2023	21,336	+0.52%

Source: EHESS and INSEE (1968-2023)

== Transport ==
Saint-Gratien is served by Saint-Gratien station on Paris RER line and by the bus number 138 going to Paris — Porte de Clichy.

== See also ==
- Communes of the Val-d'Oise department
