= Canton of Argenteuil-3 =

Coordinates: 48.94°N 2.24°E

The canton of Argenteuil-3 is an administrative division of the Val-d'Oise department, Île-de-France region, northern France. It was created at the French canton reorganisation which came into effect in March 2015. Its seat is in Argenteuil.

It consists of the following communes:

1. Argenteuil (partly)
2. Bezons
