= Canton of Argenteuil-2 =

Coordinates: 48.95°N 2.27°E

The canton of Argenteuil-2 is an administrative division of the Val-d'Oise department, Île-de-France region, northern France. It was created at the French canton reorganisation which came into effect in March 2015. Its seat is in Argenteuil.

It consists of the following communes:

- Argenteuil (partly)
