= The Seine at Argenteuil =

1873 painting by Claude Monet

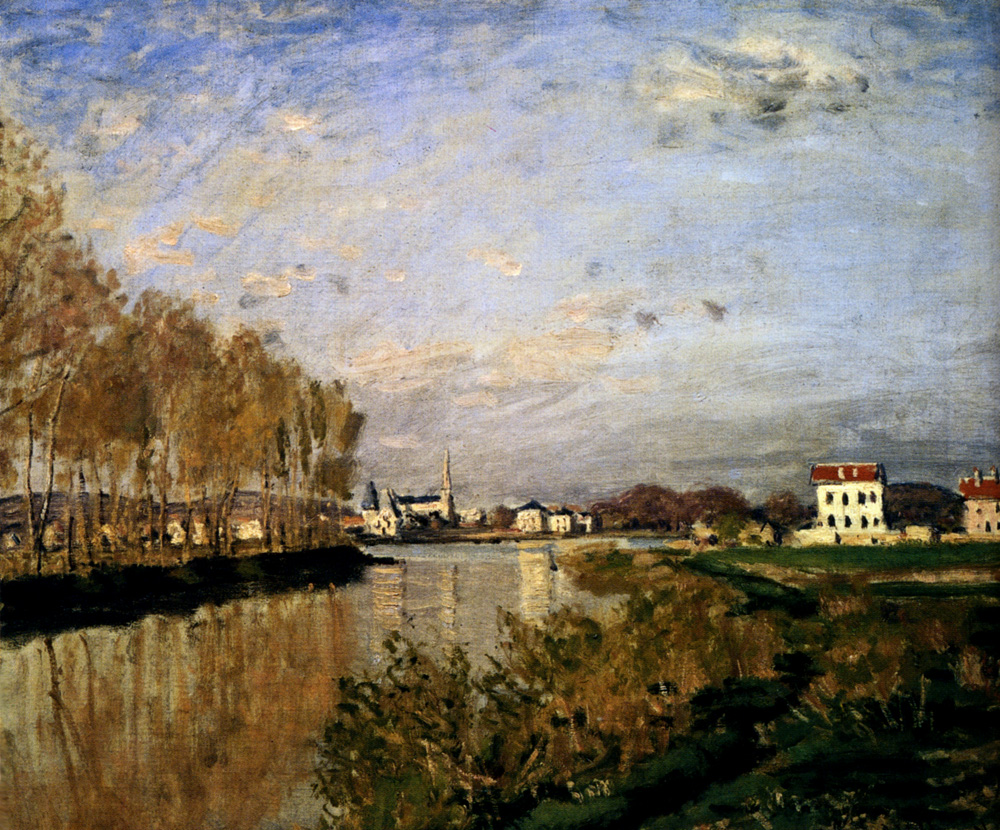
- Artist: Claude Monet
- Year: 1873
- Medium: oil on canvas
- Dimensions: 50.5 cm × 61.5 cm (19.9 in × 24.2 in)
- Location: Musée d'Orsay, Paris (France)

The Seine at Argenteuil is an 1873 oil painting by Claude Monet. It is one of many paintings the artist made of the area.

The painting is in the collection of Musee d’Orsey.

== In popular culture ==
The Seine at Argenteuil was featured in and provided (along with other Monet paintings) the title inspiration for the 2001 film Vanilla Sky. In the film the main character, David (Tom Cruise), owns the painting, and his subconscious makes use of its depiction of the sky.

Baltimore Screamo band Julia Set has a song named after the painting.

== See also ==
- List of paintings by Claude Monet
