= Canton of Argenteuil-1 =

Coordinates: 48.96°N 2.24°E

The canton of Argenteuil-1 is an administrative division of the Val-d'Oise department, Île-de-France region, northern France. It was created at the French canton reorganisation which came into effect in March 2015. Its seat is in Argenteuil.

It consists of the following communes:

1. Argenteuil (partly)
2. Saint-Gratien
3. Sannois

The current departmental councilors for Argenteuil-1 are:

1. Marie-Evelyne Christin, Sannois city councilor, former Sannois departmental councilor, Val-d’Oise departmental council vice-president.
2. Philippe Metezeau, Argenteuil city councilor, former Eastern Argenteuil departmental councilor, Val-d’Oise departmental council vice-president.
