= Argenteuil =

- Subprefecture and commune
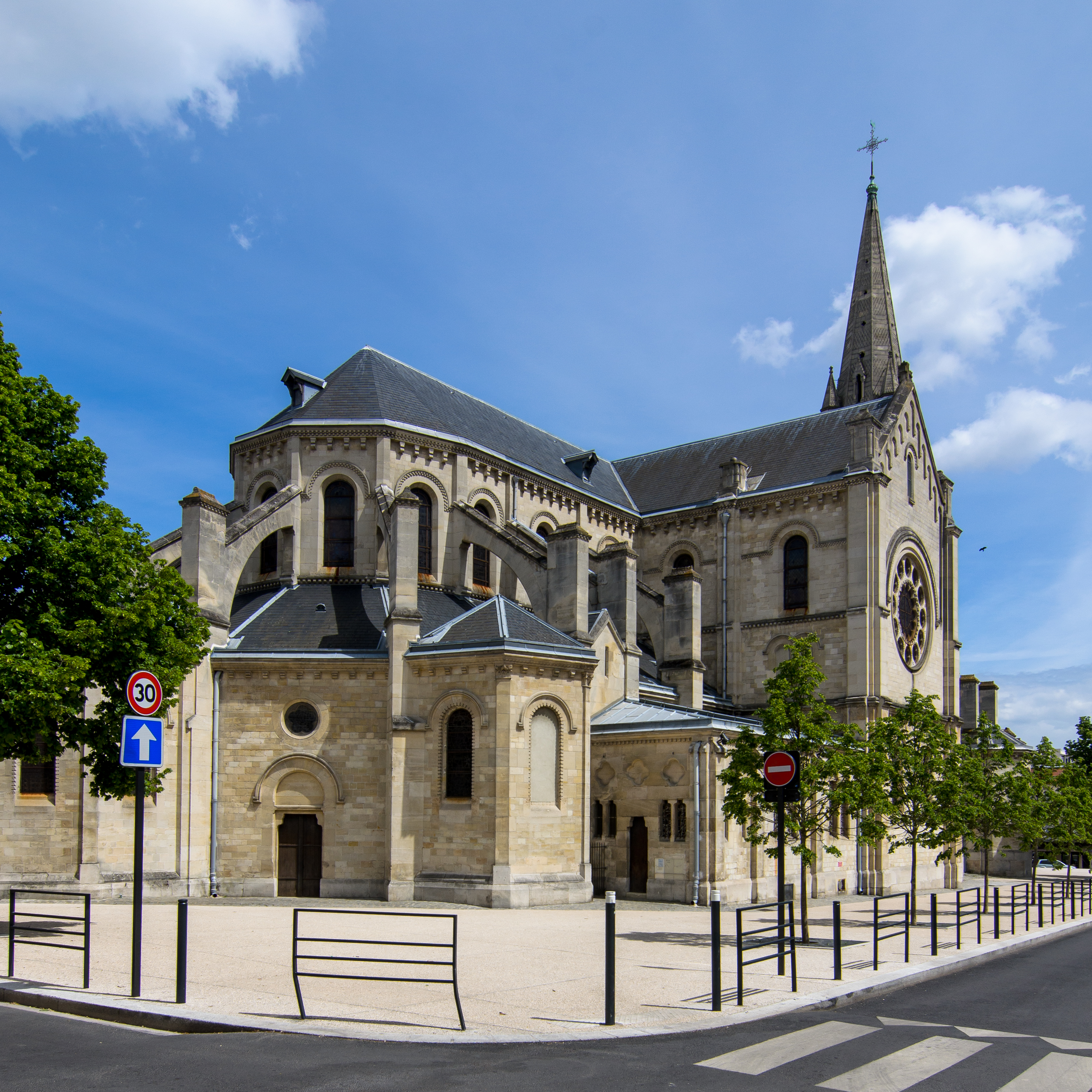
- The Basilica of Argenteuil

- Coat of arms

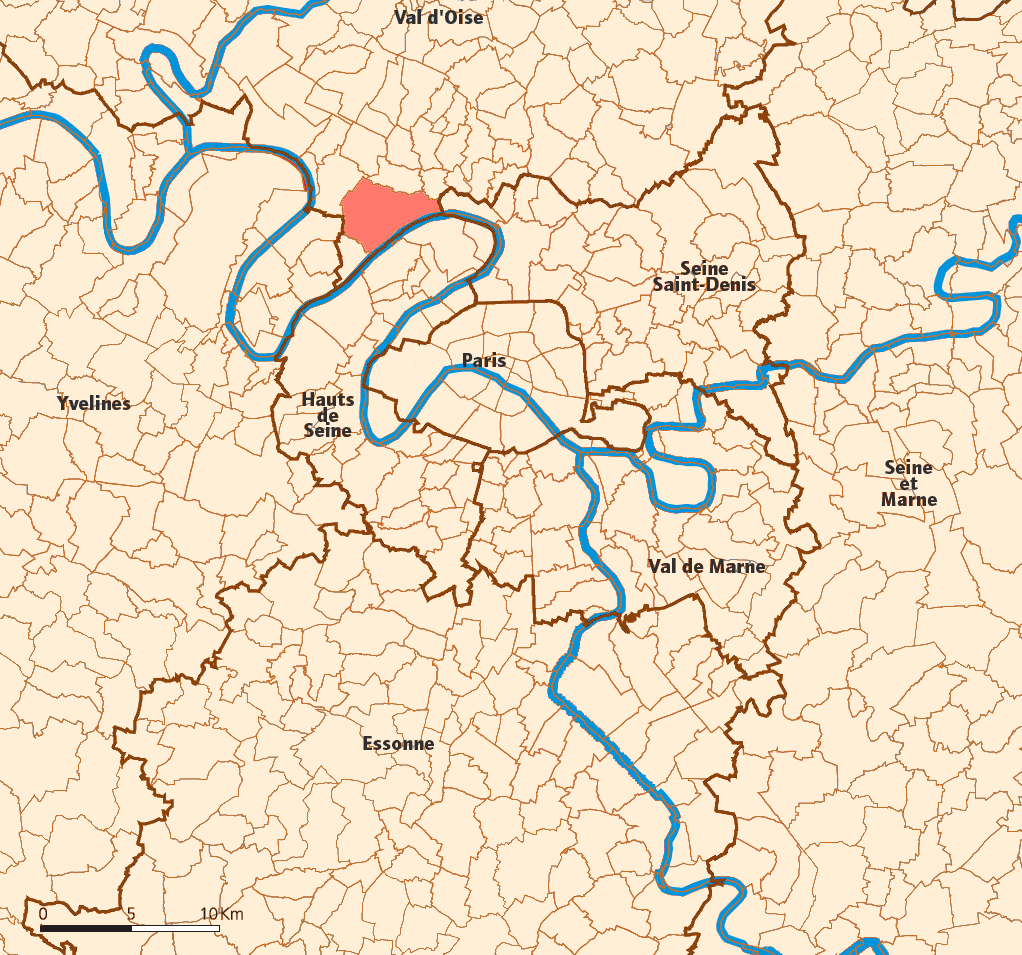
- Location (in red) within Paris inner and outer suburbs
- Location of Argenteuil
- Location within France Location within Île-de-France (region)
- Coordinates: 48°56′52″N 2°14′56″E
- Country: France
- Region: Île-de-France
- Department: Val-d'Oise
- Arrondissement: Argenteuil
- Canton: Argenteuil-1; Argenteuil-2; Argenteuil-3
- Intercommunality: Métropole du Grand Paris; EPT Boucle Nord Seine

Government
  - Mayor (2020–2026): Georges Mothron
- Area^{1}: 17.22 km^{2} (6.65 sq mi)
- Highest elevation: 167 m (548 ft)
- Lowest elevation: 21 m (69 ft)
- Population (2023): 106,130
  - Density: 6,163/km^{2} (15,960/sq mi)
- Time zone: UTC+01:00 (CET)
  - Summer (DST): UTC+02:00 (CEST)
- INSEE/Postal code: 95018 /95100
- ^{1} French Land Register data, which excludes lakes, ponds, glaciers > 1 km^{2} (0.386 sq mi or 247 acres) and river estuaries.

Argenteuil (French: [aʁʒɑ̃tœj]) is a commune in the northwestern suburbs of Paris, France. It is located 12.3 km (7.6 mi) from the center of Paris. Argenteuil is a sub-prefecture of the Val-d'Oise department, the seat of the arrondissement of Argenteuil. Argenteuil is part of the Métropole du Grand Paris.

Argenteuil is the fourth most populous commune in the suburbs of Paris (after Boulogne-Billancourt, Saint-Denis, and Montreuil) and the most populous one in the Val-d'Oise department, although it is not its prefecture, which is shared between the communes of Cergy and Pontoise.

Argenteuil shares borders with communes in 3 departements others than Val d'Oise : the Yvelines, Hauts-de-Seine, and Seine-Saint-Denis departements.

== Name ==
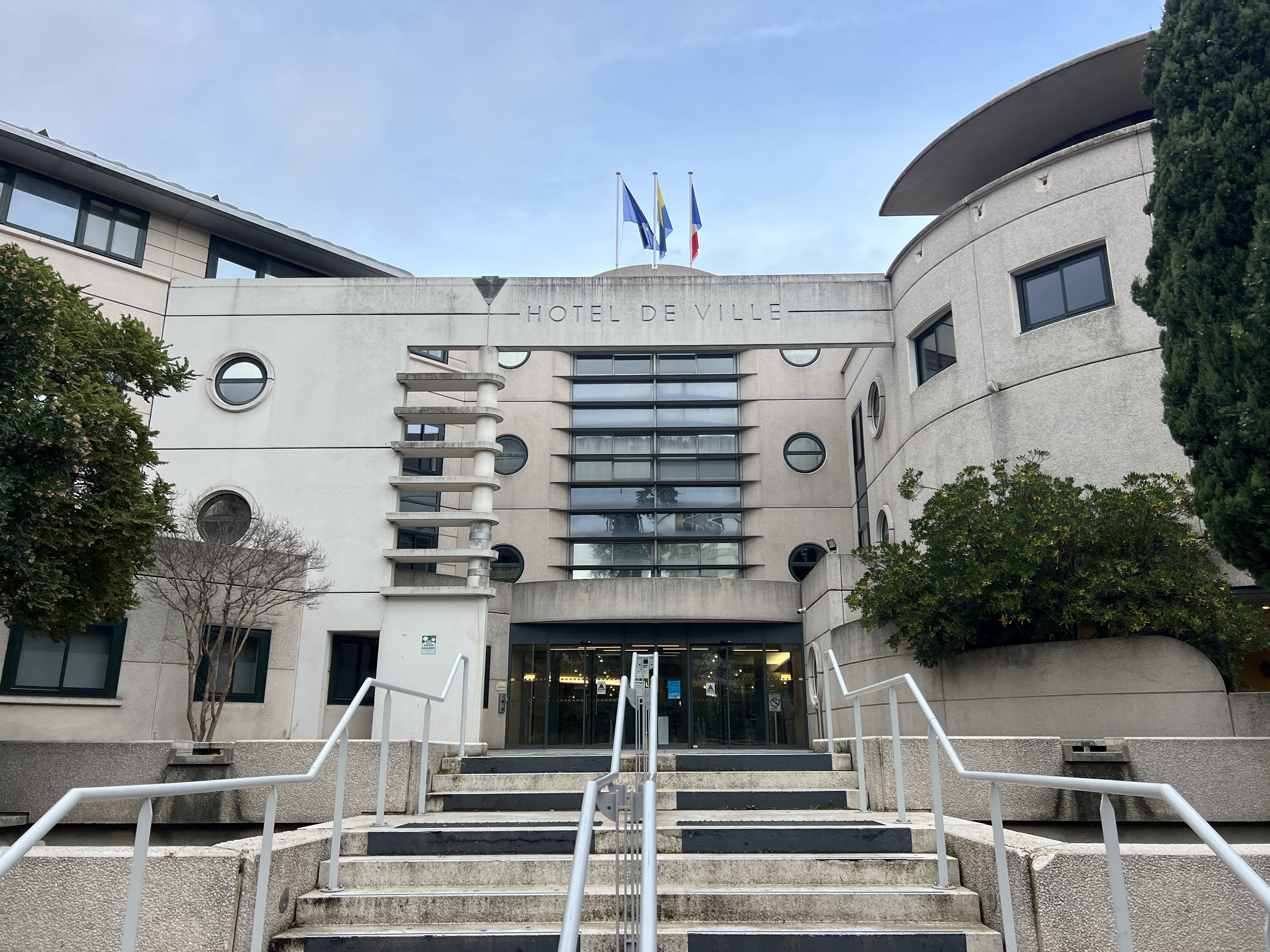
The Hotel de Ville

The name Argenteuil is recorded for the first time in a royal charter of 697 as Argentoialum, from a Latin/Gaulish root argento meaning "silver", "silvery", "shiny", perhaps in reference to the gleaming surface of the river Seine, on the banks of which Argenteuil is located, and from a Gaulish language suffix -ialo meaning "clearing, glade" or "place of".

== History ==
Argenteuil was founded as a convent in the 7th century (see Pierre Abélard and the Convent of Argenteuil). The monastery that arose from the convent was later destroyed during the French Revolution.

Formerly a rural escape for Parisians, Argenteuil is now a suburb of Paris. Claude Monet lived there with his family in a rented house from 1871 to 1878, and was joined at times by some of the most famous painters of the day, including Édouard Manet, Alfred Sisley, and Auguste Renoir. Because of their work there, Argenteuil has been called "the single most important site for the birth of Impressionism." The house that Monet rented, located at 21 Boulevard Karl Marx, is since 2022 a Monet museum. Numerous paintings of the period depict scenes of Argenteuil and its surroundings, including the house in which Monet lived, in his work The Artist's House at Argenteuil.

Other prominent painters such as Gustave Caillebotte also lived and painted near there.

The Hotel de Ville was completed in 1994.

== Transport ==
Argenteuil is served by two stations on the Transilien Paris-Saint-Lazare suburban rail line, which are Argenteuil and Val d'Argenteuil.

Since redeveloped by STIF and SNCF, Argenteuil has been equipped with the new Paris-Saint-Lazare-Ermont-Eaubonne line. The new line was launched in 2006, adding the Paris-Saint Lazare / Cormeilles-en-Parisis - Pontoise / Mantes-la-Jolie service to Paris for about ten minutes.

== Education ==
As of 2016, the commune's schools have over 12,000 students. The commune has:

- 30 public preschools (maternelles) and one private elementary school with a preschool
- 26 public and 2 private elementary schools
- 11 junior high schools (collèges) - 10 public and 1 private
- 6 senior high schools/sixth-form colleges:
  - Lycée Georges Braque
  - Lycée Cognacq-Jay
  - Lycée Julie-Victoire Daubié
  - Lycée Jean Jaurès
  - Lycée Fernand et Nadia Léger
  - Ecole nationale des professions de l'automobile (private)

Paris 13 University serves as the area university.

The Conservatoire à rayonnement départemental de Musique, Danse et Théâtre is located in Argenteuil. André Bon is one of its former students.

== Social Housing ==
In June 2025, the demolition and reconstruction of the "Château" social housing building in the Val-Notre-Dame district is part of a vast urban renewal project.

== Population ==
Historical population

Year	Pop.	±% p.a.
1793	5,356	—
1800	4,609	−2.12%
1806	4,249	−1.35%
1821	4,423	+0.27%
1831	4,542	+0.27%
1836	4,536	−0.03%
1841	4,377	−0.71%
1846	4,586	+0.94%
1851	4,767	+0.78%
1856	5,857	+4.20%
1861	7,269	+4.41%
1866	8,176	+2.38%
1872	8,389	+0.43%
1876	8,990	+1.74%
1881	11,849	+5.68%
1886	12,809	+1.57%
1891	13,339	+0.81%
1896	15,116	+2.53%
1901	17,375	+2.82%

Year	Pop.	±% p.a.
1906	19,829	+2.68%
1911	24,282	+4.14%
1921	32,173	+2.85%
1926	44,538	+6.72%
1931	70,657	+9.67%
1936	59,314	−3.44%
1946	53,543	−1.02%
1954	63,316	+2.12%
1962	82,321	+3.34%
1968	90,480	+1.59%
1975	102,530	+1.80%
1982	95,347	−1.03%
1990	93,096	−0.30%
1999	93,961	+0.10%
2007	102,572	+1.10%
2012	104,962	+0.46%
2017	110,210	+0.98%
2023	106,130	−0.63%

Source: EHESS and INSEE (1968–2023)

=== Immigration ===
Place of birth of residents of Argenteuil in 1999
Born in metropolitan France	Born outside metropolitan France			
77.5%	22.5%			
77.5%	Born in overseas France	Born in foreign countries with French citizenship at birth^{1}	EU-15 immigrants^{2}	Non-EU-15 immigrants
77.5%	2.1%	2.1%	4.3%	14.0%
^{1} This group is made up largely of former French settlers, such as pieds-noirs in Northwest Africa, followed by former colonial citizens who had French citizenship at birth (such as was often the case for the native elite in French colonies), as well as to a lesser extent foreign-born children of French expatriates. A foreign country is understood as a country not part of France in 1999, so a person born for example in 1950 in Algeria, when Algeria was an integral part of France, is nonetheless listed as a person born in a foreign country in French statistics.^{2} An immigrant is a person born in a foreign country not having French citizenship at birth. An immigrant may have acquired French citizenship since moving to France, but is still considered an immigrant in French statistics. On the other hand, persons born in France with foreign citizenship (the children of immigrants) are not listed as immigrants.

== Twin towns – sister cities ==
Argenteuil is twinned with:

- Alessandria, Italy
- Dessau-Roßlau, Germany
- Hunedoara, Romania
- West Dunbartonshire, Scotland, United Kingdom
- Fátima, Portugal

== Notable people ==
- Héloïse (c. 1100/01 – 1163/64), nun, philosopher and writer
- Charles Longuet (1839–1903), journalist and socialist activist
- Claude Monet (1840–1926), painter, lived and worked here in 1871–1878
- Georges Braque (1882–1963), painter, sculptor and co-founder of cubism
- Sidney Duteil (born 1955), musician and television host
- Ingrid Chauvin (born 1971), actress
- Thomas Henry (born 1994), professional footballer
- Florent Mothe (born 1981), singer and actor
- Franck Béria (born 1983), retired professional footballer and functionary
- Ibrahim Gary (born 1985), karateka
- Fabien Ateba (born 1991), basketball player
- Kevin Mayer (born 1992), athlete, Olympic medalist
- Cécile Pelous, philanthropist and designer
- Laurina Fazer (born 2003), footballer for France

== Famous paintings of Argenteuil ==
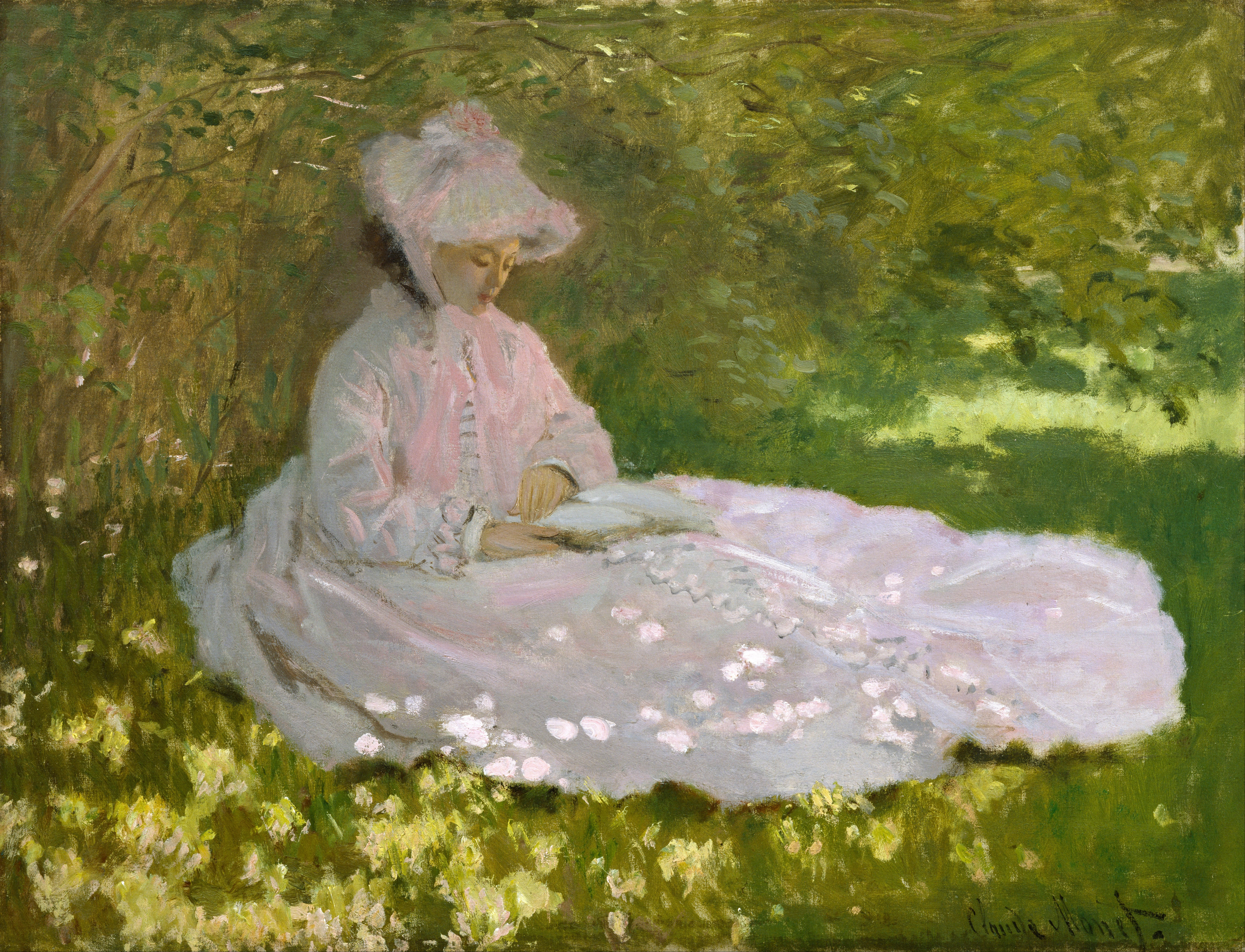
In his 1872 painting, Springtime, Monet was interested in studying how unblended dabs of color could suggest the effect of brilliant sunlight filtered through leaves The Walters Art Museum.

- By Claude Monet:

Autumn at Argenteuil, Regatta at Argenteuil, Red Boats, Argenteuil, The Bridge at Argenteuil, The Port at Argenteuil, The Seine at Argenteuil, The Artist's House at Argenteuil, View of Argenteuil-Snow, Bords de la Seine a Argenteuil, and Snow at Argenteuil. And Train in snow at Argenteuil.

- By other painters:

Argenteuil and Seine near Argenteuil by Édouard Manet, Regatta at Argenteuil by Pierre-Auguste Renoir, and The Bridge in Argenteuil by Gustave Caillebotte.

=== Gallery ===
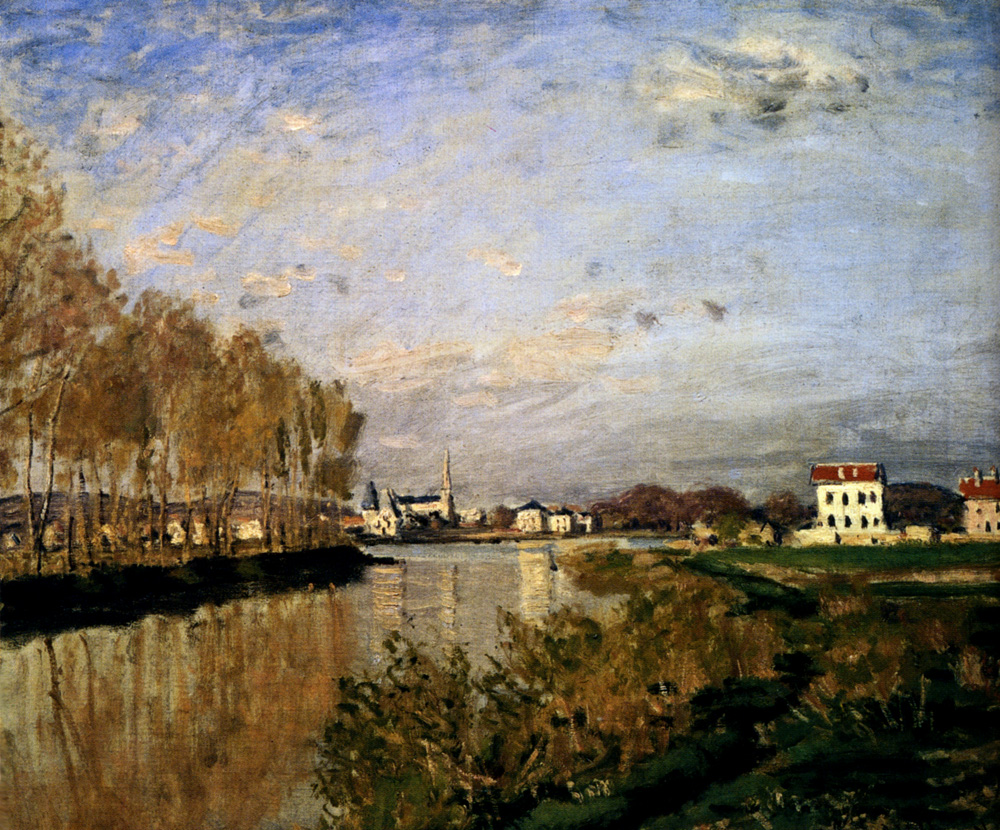
Claude Monet, The Seine at Argenteuil, 1873

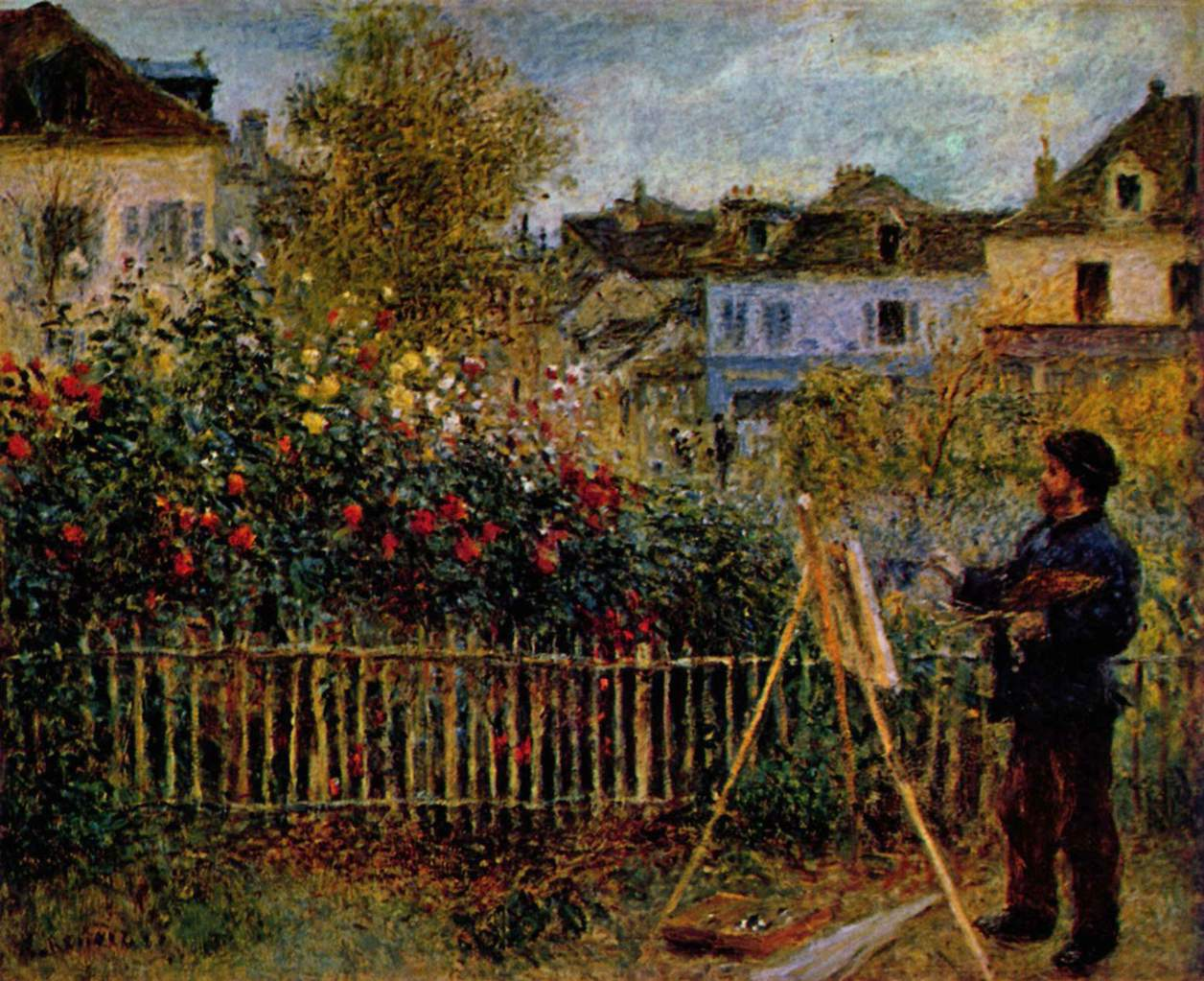
Pierre-Auguste Renoir, Claude Monet Painting in His Garden at Argenteuil, 1873

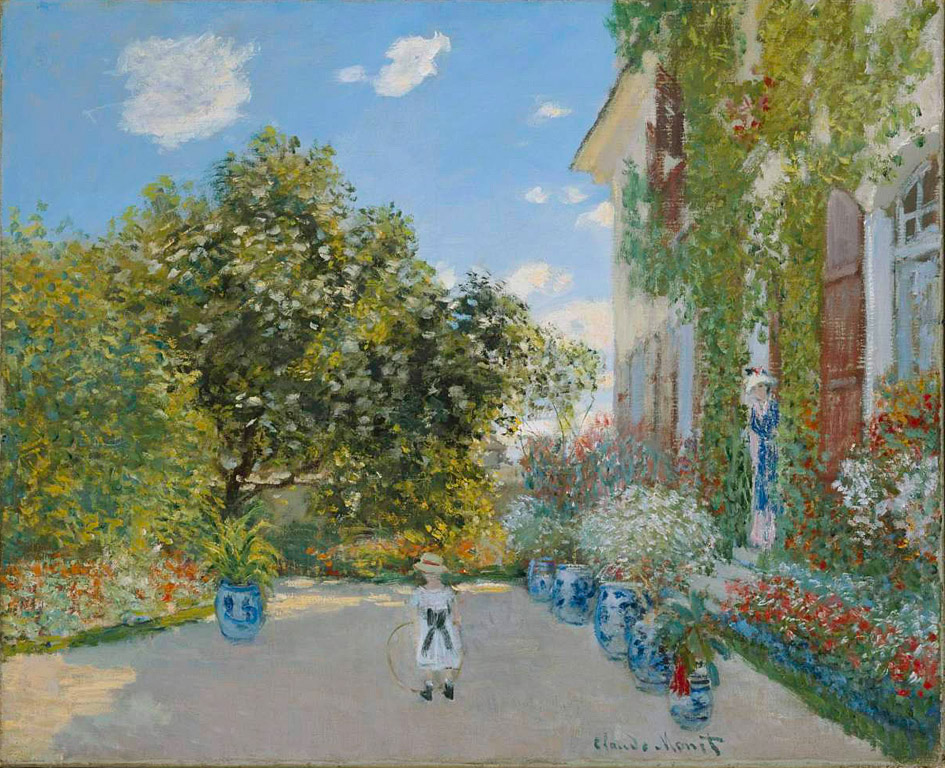
Claude Monet, The Artist's House at Argenteuil, 1873

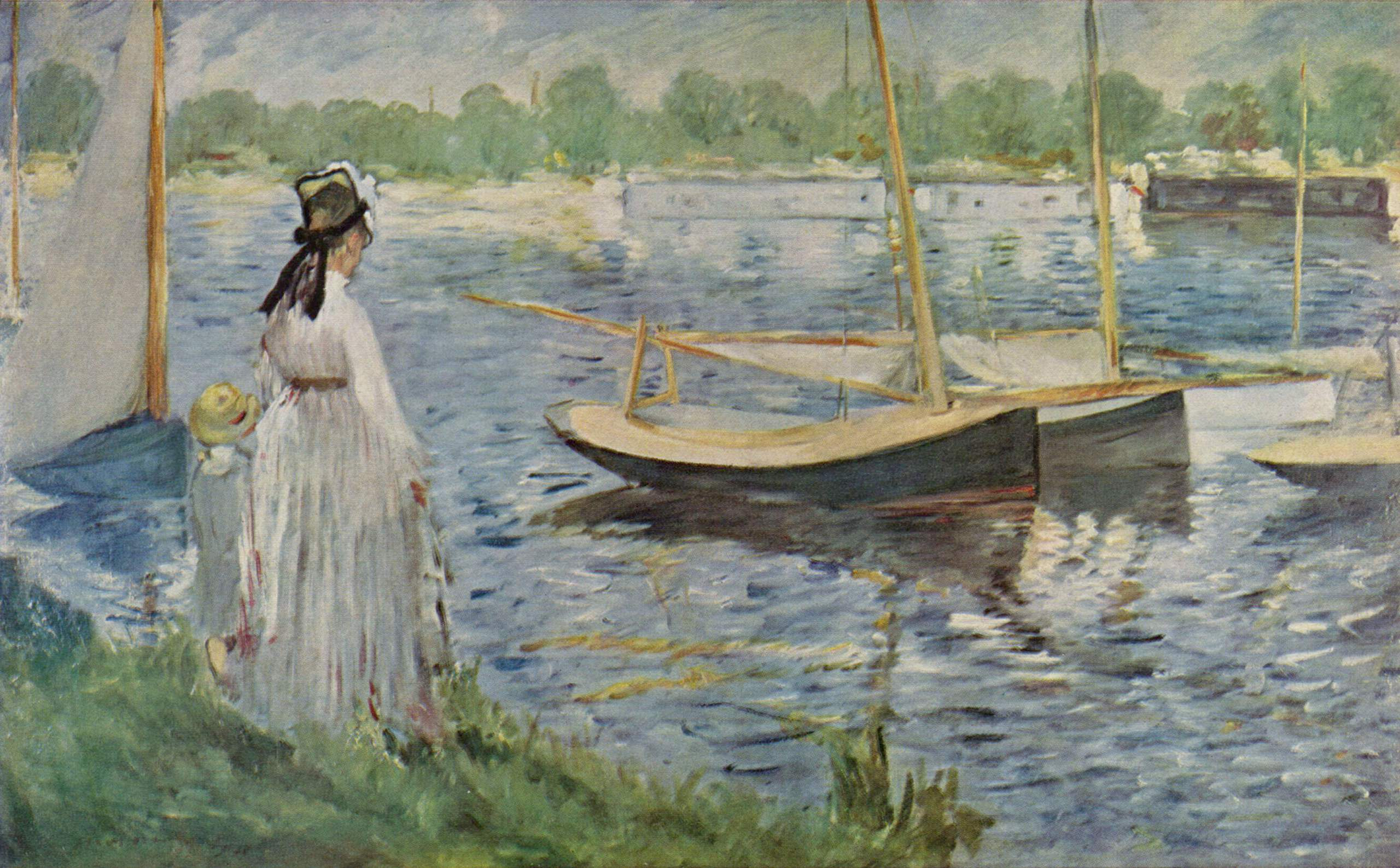
Édouard Manet, The Seine near Argenteuil, 1874

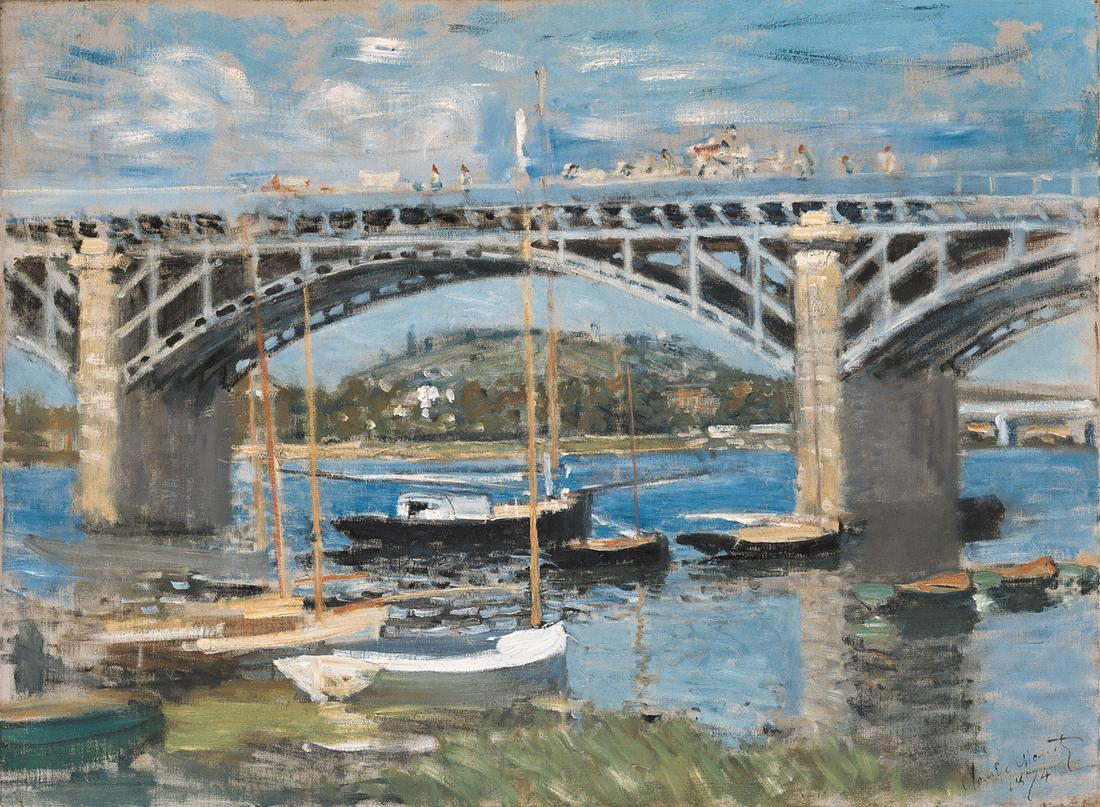
Claude Monet, The Seine at Argenteuil, 1874

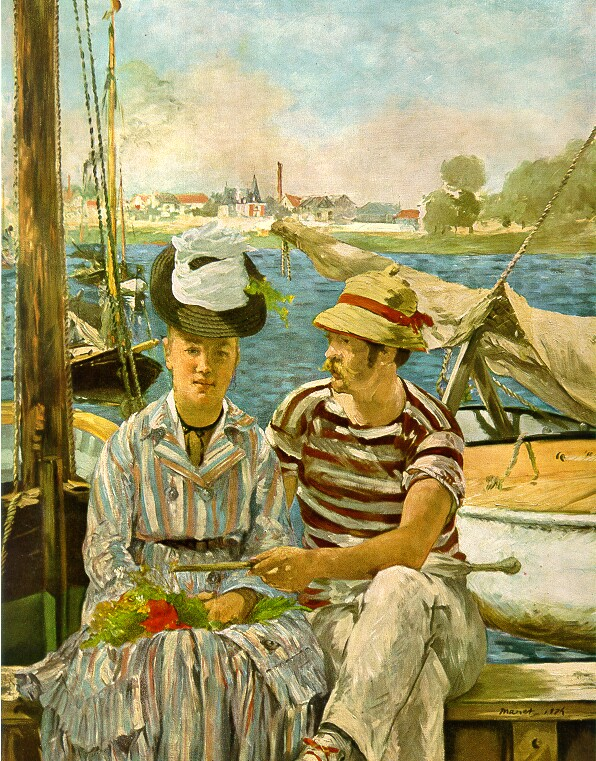
Édouard Manet, Argenteuil, 1875

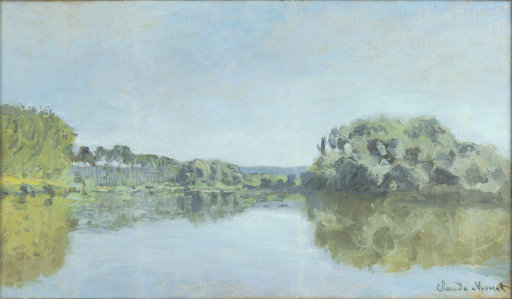
Claude Monet, Bords de la Seine à Argenteuil, 1875

== See also ==
- Communes of the Val-d'Oise department
