= Franconville =

Franconville may refer to the following French municipalities :

- Franconville, Meurthe-et-Moselle, in the Meurthe-et-Moselle department
- Franconville, Val-d'Oise, in the Val-d'Oise department
- Canton of Franconville
