= Hôtel de Ville, Franconville =

Town hall in Franconville, France

Hôtel de Ville
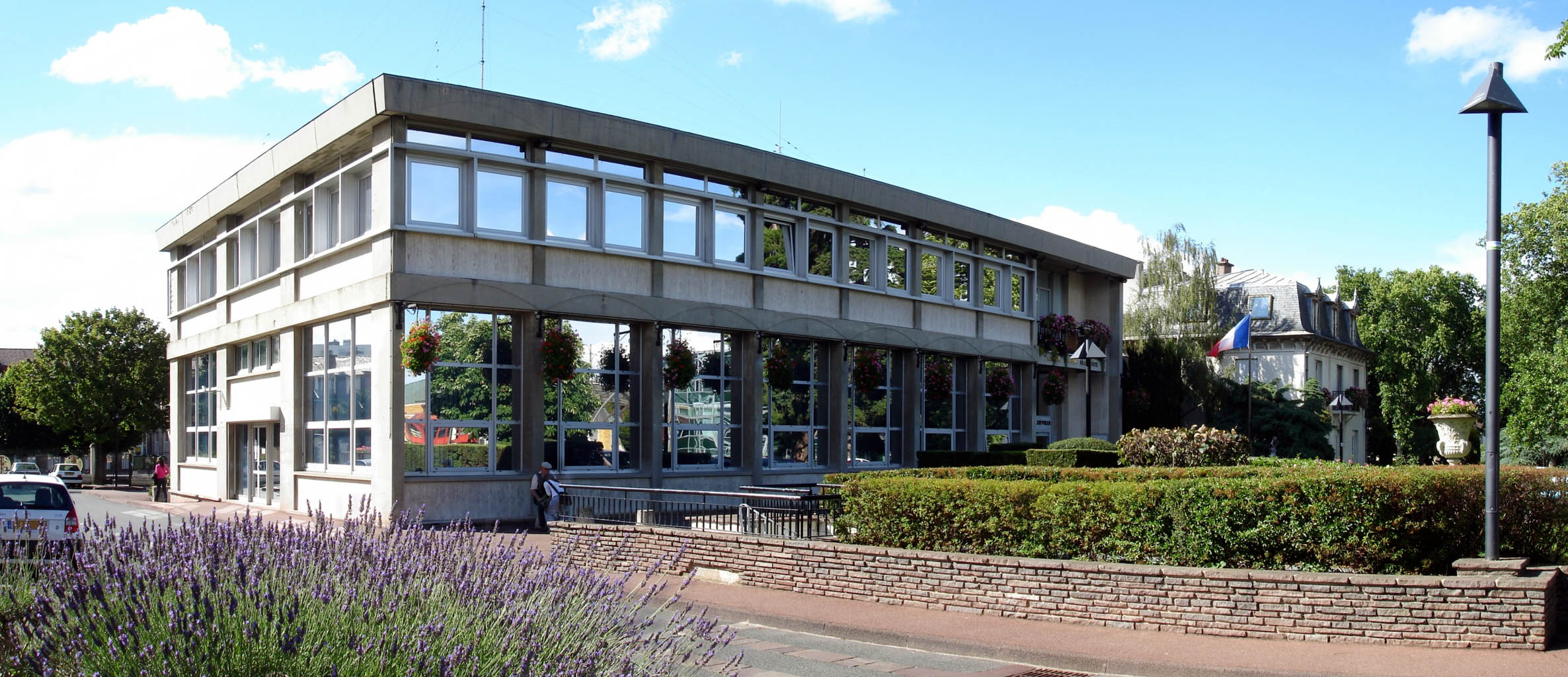
- The main frontage of the current Hôtel de Ville in July 2007
- Interactive map of the Hôtel de Ville area

General information
- Type: City hall
- Architectural style: Modern style
- Location: Franconville, France
- Coordinates: 48.9861°N 2.2299°E
- Completed: 1968

The Hôtel de Ville (French pronunciation: [otɛl də vil], City Hall) is a municipal building in Franconville, Val-d'Oise, in northern France, standing on Rue de la Station.

== History ==
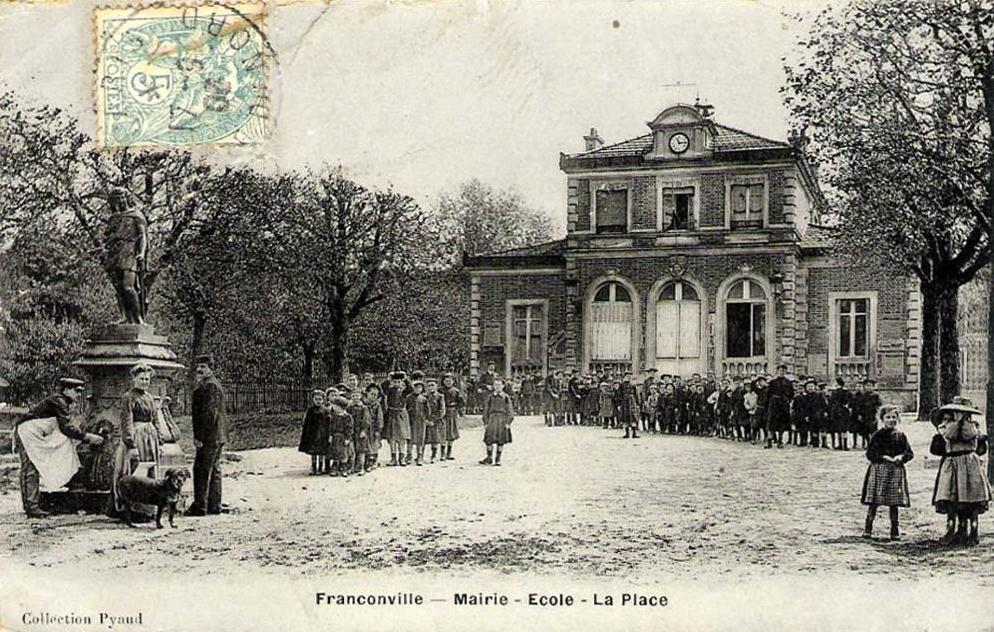
The third town hall

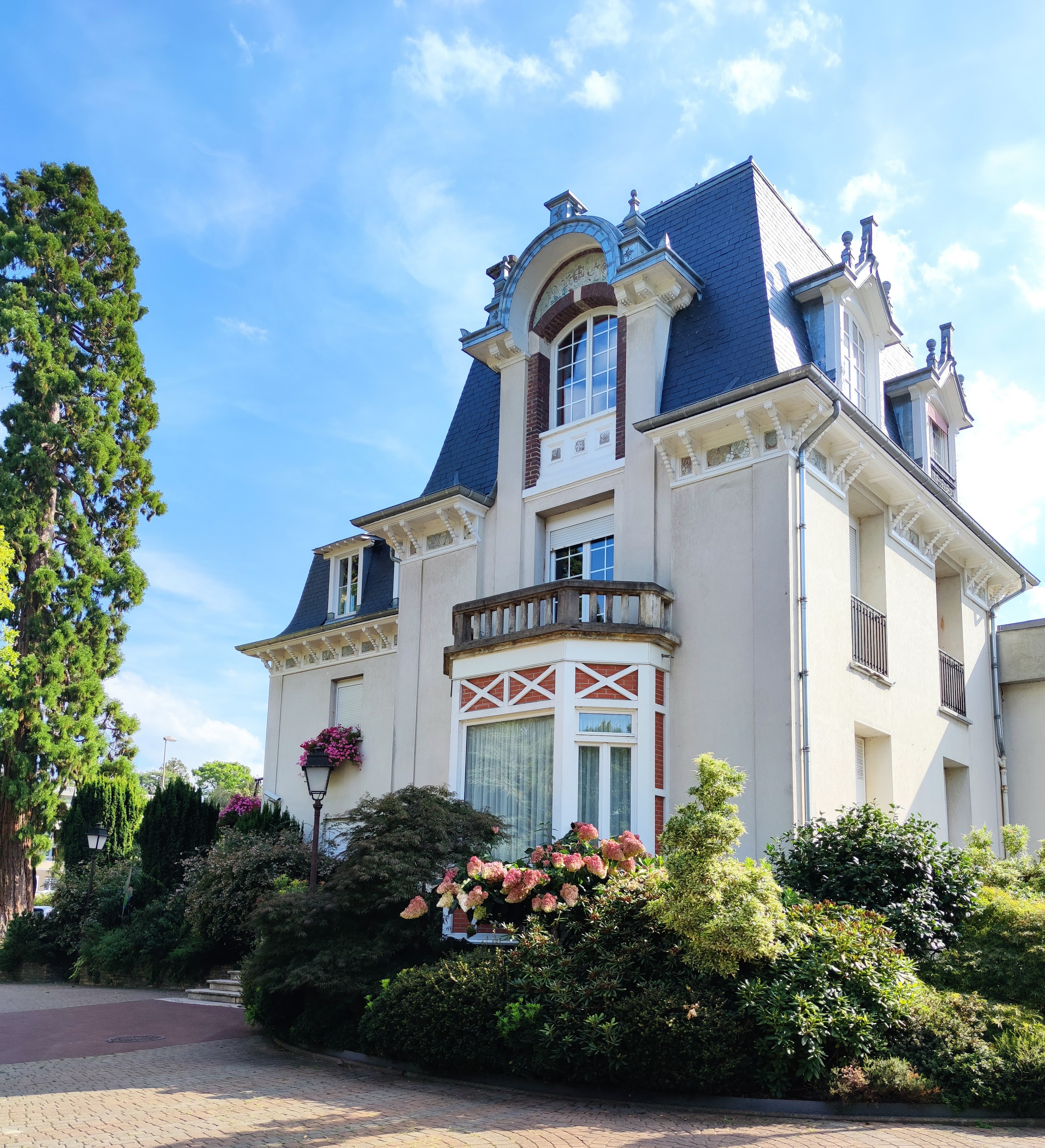
The fourth town hall (Villa Enders)

Following the French Revolution, the town council initially met at the home of the mayor at the time. This arrangement continued until the late 1830s, when the council decided to commission a combined town hall and school. The site they selected was on the west side of the old Church of Saint Mary Magdalene which has since been demolished but dated from the 15th century. This building, the first town hall, was designed in the neoclassical style, built in ashlar stone and was completed in 1842. The design involved a symmetrical main frontage of three bays facing onto what is now Rue du Général Leclerc. It was fenestrated with casement windows on both floors and, at roof level, there was a pediment with an oculus in the tympanum.

As demand for school places increased, the council decided to commission a new combined town hall and school in the 1870s. The site they selected was on Rue de Paris. This school was intended specifically for boys, the girls remaining at the previous location. This building, the second town hall, was designed in the neoclassical style, built in brick with stone dressings and was completed in 1881. The design involved a two-storey main block and a long single-storey classroom block.

In the early 20th century, the council decided to commission a dedicated town hall. The site they selected was on Rue de la Station. This building, the third town hall, was designed in the neoclassical style, built in brick with stone dressings and was completed in 1909. The design involved a symmetrical main frontage of five bays facing onto Rue de la Station. The central section of three bays featured a round-headed doorway flanked by a pair of round-headed windows. The first floor was fenestrated by square-headed casement windows. The end bays, which were single storey, were fenestrated in a similar style to the first floor. Above the central bay, there was a clock flanked by pilasters supporting a segmental pediment. Internally, the principal room was the Salle des Fêtes (ballroom) at the rear of the building.

In the early 1930s, following a significant increase in population, the council decided to acquire a new municipal building. The building they selected was the Villa Enders, to the north of the third town hall on Rue de la Station. This building, the fourth town hall, was commissioned by Jules Enders, managing director of Crédit Lyonnais. It was designed by Richard Bouwens van der Boijen in the châteauesque style, built in brick with a stucco finish and was completed in 1894. The design involved a main frontage of three bays facing north towards a large garden (now Parc de la Mairie). The right-hand bay, which was projected forward, featured a bay window on the ground floor, a French door and a balustraded balcony on the first floor, and a round headed window at attic level. The windows on the upper floors were flanked by pilasters surmounted by an arch with finials. The building was acquired by the council in 1932, and a covered veranda was subsequently demolished.

During the Second World War, four members of the French Forces of the Interior and one American solder, Sergeant Francis Hurteau, were killed during fighting for the liberation of the town on 28 August 1944. Their bodies were taken to a temporary mortuary in the town hall and a plaque was subsequently installed there to commemorate their lives.

In the 1960s, the council decided to demolish the third town hall and erect a modern municipal building between on the land between the third town hall and the fourth town hall. This building, the fifth town hall, was designed in the modern style, built in concrete and glass and was completed in 1968. The design involved an asymmetrical main frontage of eight bays facing onto Rue de la Station. The right-hand bay featured a glass doorway on the ground floor and a French door with a balcony on the first floor. The other bays, which were separated by concrete piers, were fenestrated with casement windows on the ground floor and bi-partite windows on the first floor. Internally, the principal room was the Salle du Conseil (council chamber).
