= Cernay station =

Railway station in Ermont, France

Cernay
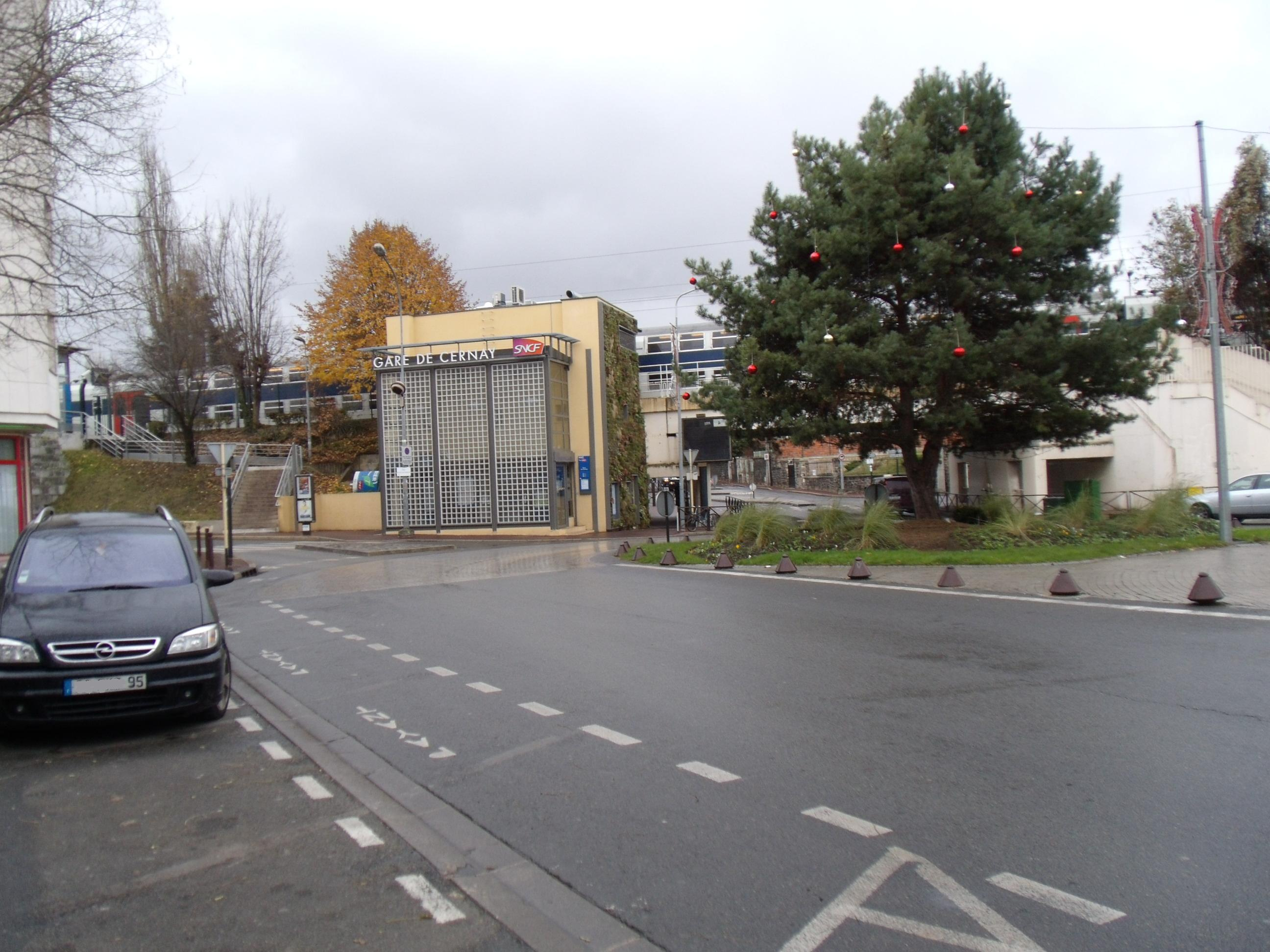

General information
- Location: Ermont, France
- Coordinates: 48°59′06″N 2°15′26″E
- Owner: SNCF

Construction
- Accessible: Yes, by prior reservation

Other information
- Station code: 87276063

Passengers
- 2024: 3,088,419

Services
Preceding station	Transilien	Following station
Ermont–Eaubonne towards Paris-Nord	Line H	Franconville – Le Plessis-Bouchard towards Pontoise
Preceding station	RER	Following station
Franconville – Le Plessis-Bouchard towards Pontoise	RER C	Ermont–Eaubonne towards Massy-Palaiseau, Dourdan-la-Forêt or Saint-Martin-d'Étampes
Location

Cernay is a railway station in the commune of Ermont (Val-d'Oise department), France. The station is served by trains of the Paris Nord line H and the RER C. It takes around 25 minutes to reach Paris Gare du Nord or Neuilly Porte Maillot stations from Gare de Cernay.

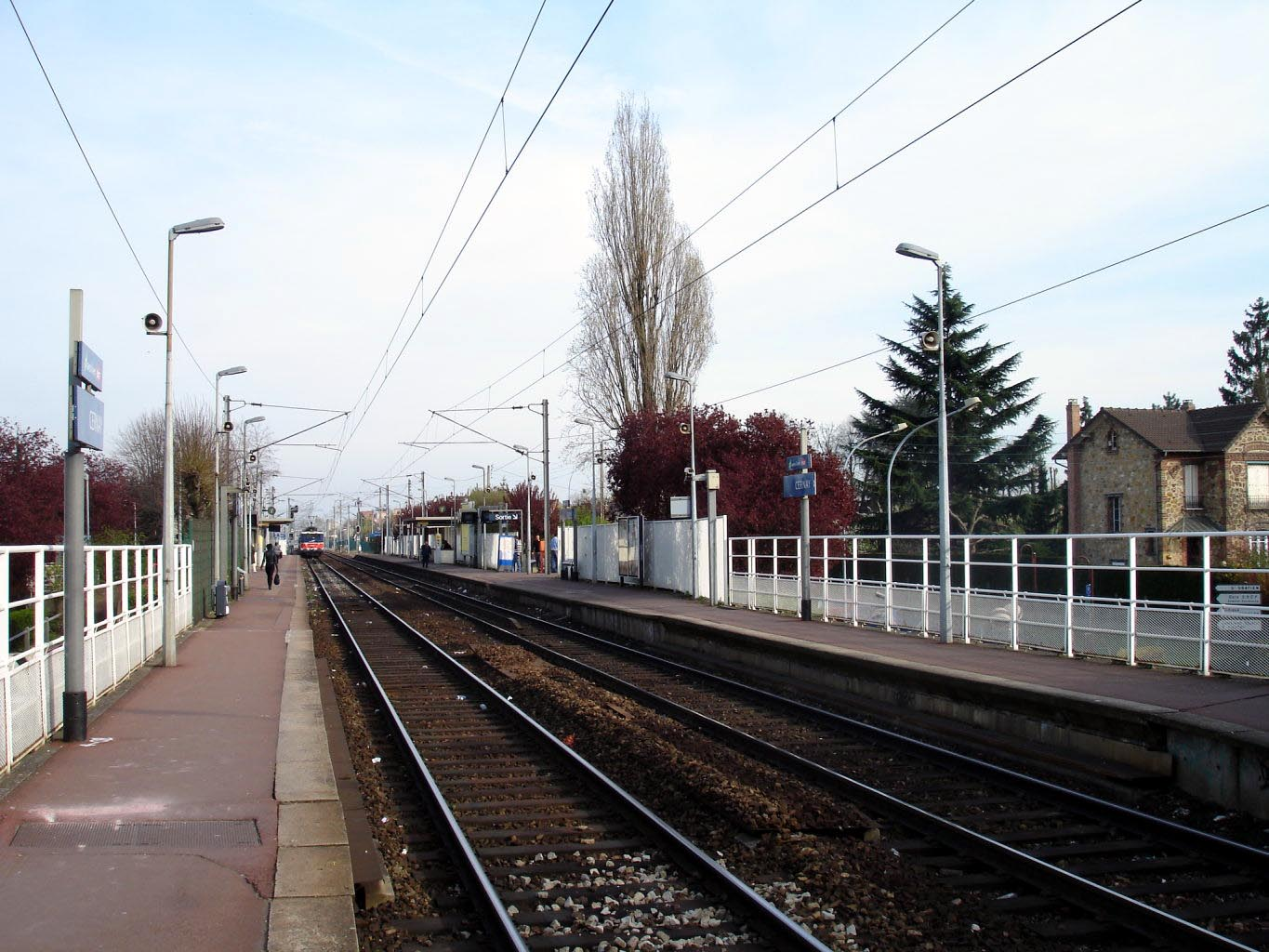
Platforms
