= Franconville – Le Plessis-Bouchard station =

French railway station

Franconville – Le Plessis-Bouchard
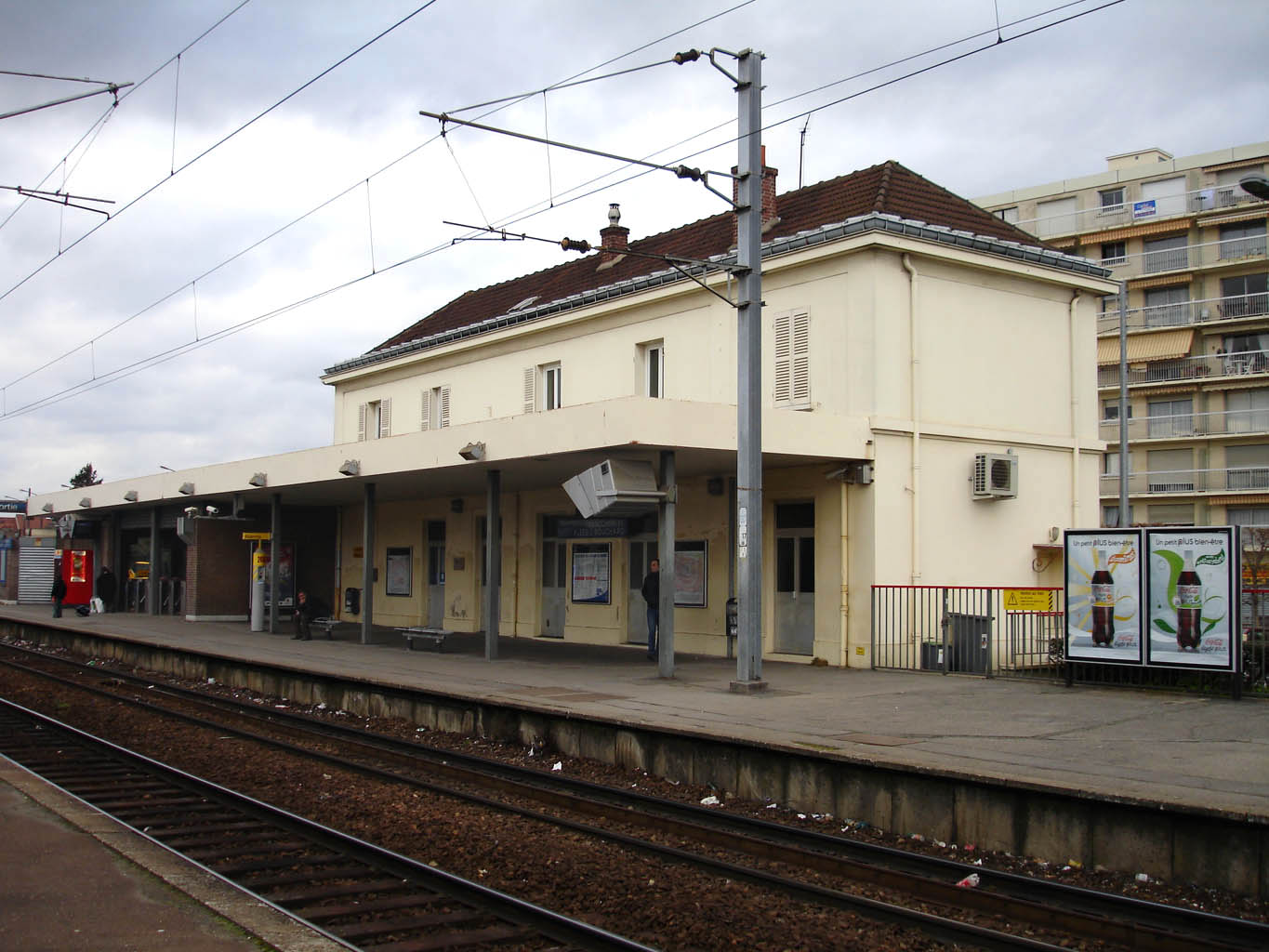

General information
- Location: Franconville, Val-d'Oise, Île-de-France, France
- Coordinates: 48°59′37″N 2°14′06″E
- Line: Saint-Denis–Dieppe railway RER C

Other information
- Station code: 87276071

Passengers
- 2024: 6,019,741

Services
Preceding station	Transilien	Following station
Cernay towards Paris-Nord	Line H	Montigny–Beauchamp towards Pontoise
Preceding station	RER	Following station
Montigny–Beauchamp towards Pontoise	RER C	Cernay towards Massy-Palaiseau, Dourdan-la-Forêt or Saint-Martin-d'Étampes
Location

Transilien service departing from the station.

Franconville – Le Plessis-Bouchard (French pronunciation: [fʁɑ̃kɔ̃vil lə plɛsi buʃaʁ]) is a station in Franconville, a northwestern suburb of Paris, France. It is served by Transilien regional trains from Paris to Pontoise, and by RER rapid transit.

== See also ==
- List of stations of the Paris RER
