= VMI line =

French railway line

Ermont Eaubonne to Champ-de-Mars line, also known as the Vallée de Montmorency - Invalides (VMI) line, is a French railway line in the Île-de-France region, part of the RER C line. It connects the Champ de Mars - Tour Eiffel station in Paris with the Ermont - Eaubonne station in the Val-d'Oise department, fifteen kilometers north of the capital. It forms line n° 962 000 of the national rail network.

The VMI brings together two old lines with specific histories: the Auteuil line, which became part of the Petite Ceinture line within Paris, and the line from La Plaine to Ermont-Eaubonne, the Grésillons line. The VMI project, developed in 1977, was designed to replace the significant north-south RER transversal planned in the 1965 SDAU. The line was inaugurated on September 25, 1988, after three years of construction and a complicated gestation period marked by technical difficulties and strong opposition from residents. It is served by Z 2N railcars, with a service frequency of four trains per hour in each direction during off-peak hours and eight trains per hour during rush hours, with freight traffic mainly serving the port of Gennevilliers.

== Technical data ==
=== Layout ===
The fully double-track line branches off from the line between Les Invalides and Versailles-Rive-Gauche at Champ de Mars - Tour Eiffel station in Paris. It then runs northwest to Ermont-Eaubonne, which it reaches after crossing the 16th and 17th arrondissements of Paris and the capital's northern suburbs. At this station, it joins the Saint-Denis to Pontoise line of the Nord network.

=== Features ===
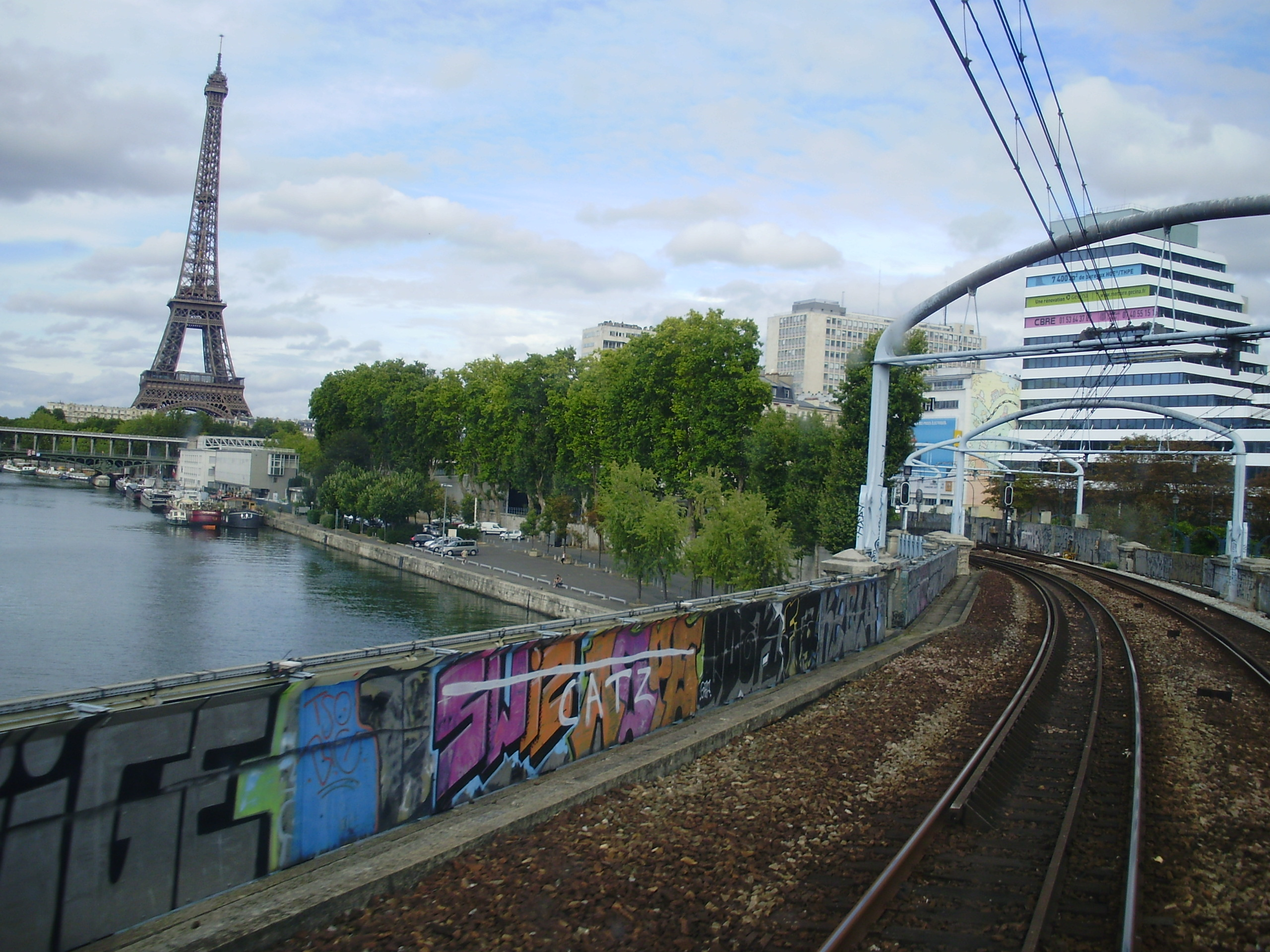
Beginning of the descent on the left arm of the Rouelle bridge towards the junction between the Invalides to Versailles-Rive-Gauche line and the Ermont-Eaubonne to Champ-de-Mars line from the driver's cab of an RER C train.

The line is electrified at two voltages. Like the entire northern network, the north section is supplied with 25 kV-50 Hz single-phase as far as Saint-Ouen (separation section north of the station) by the Saint-Denis-La Briche substation, which is remotely controlled by the central Paris-Nord substation. The Paris section of the VMI is supplied with 1,500 V by the Pereire substation, commissioned on August 18, 1988. It is fully equipped with BAL, speed control by beacons (KVB), and a ground-to-train radio link with data transmission from Paris to Ermont-Eaubonne and, without data transmission beyond, to Pontoise.

== History ==
=== Lines integrated into the VMI ===
==== Auteuil line ====
The Auteuil line, which connects Gare Saint-Lazare with Auteuil-Boulogne, was developed by the Pereire brothers, who had previously constructed the line from Paris-Saint-Lazare to Saint-Germain-en-Laye. The Compagnie des chemins de fer de l'Ouest commissioned the line on May 2, 1854, to accommodate sustained urban traffic. In 1867, the line became part of the Petite Ceinture line, which connected to the Auteuil-Boulogne station via the Auteuil and Point-du-Jour viaducts. In 1869, the Courcelles connection was opened between the Courcelles-Levallois and Avenue de Clichy stations, completing the Petite Ceinture by linking the Auteuil line to the right-bank Ceinture.

==== Saint-Ouen-les-Docks line ====
By decree of November 21, 1873, the Compagnie des chemins de fer du Nord took over the concession of the line from the Compagnie du chemin de fer and des docks de Saint-Ouen.

==== Grésillons line ====
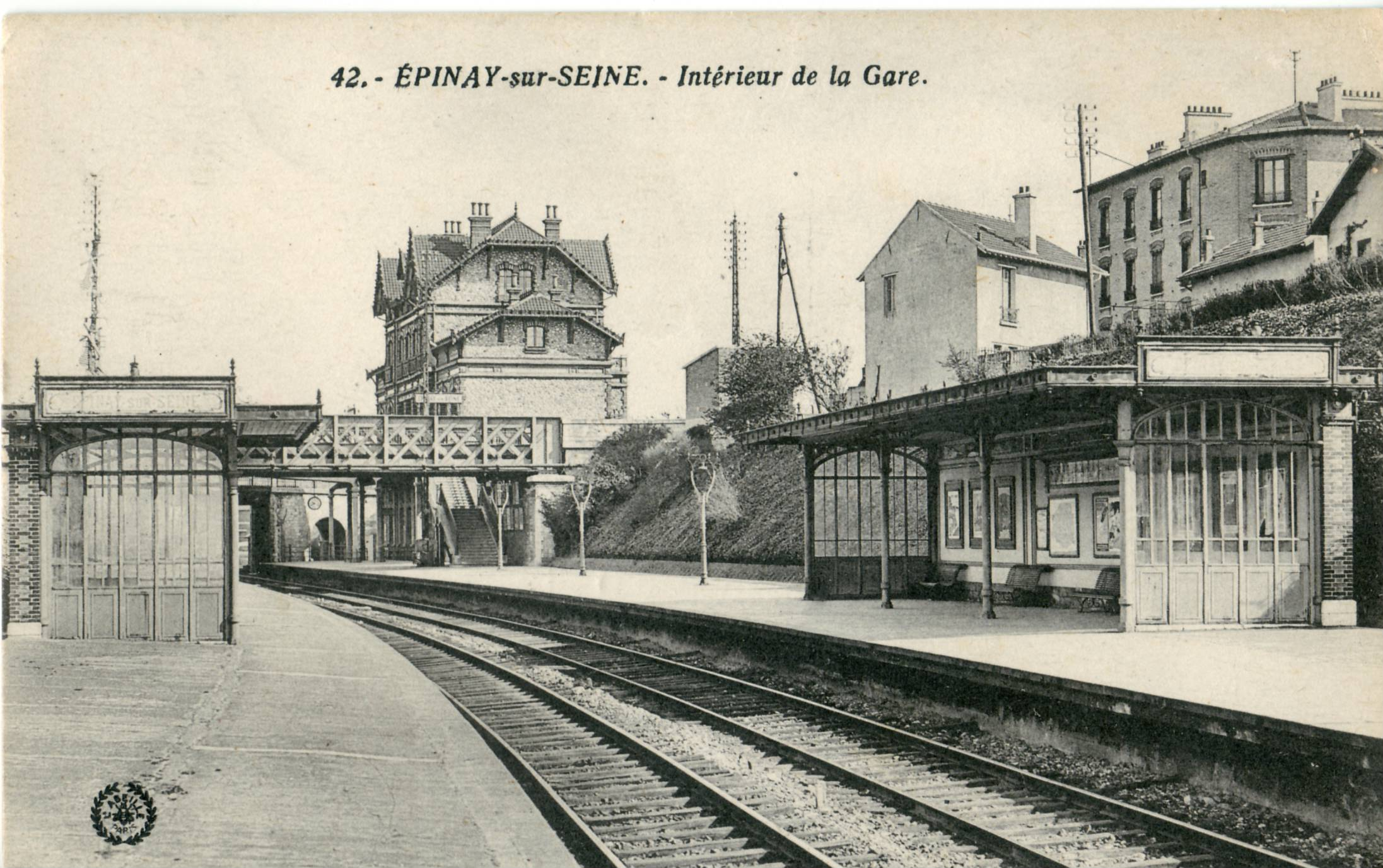
Épinay-sur-Seine station platforms at the beginning of the 20th century. The Grande Ceinture line, the future Tangentielle Nord, passes over the second bridge.

The Ermont-Eaubonne-Plaine-Gare du Nord line via Gennevilliers was built in 1905 and inaugurated on July 1, 1908, with two connections. The passenger buildings' large dimensions and elegant architecture were carefully constructed. From September 25, 1977, the trains' terminus was limited to Saint-Ouen-Garibaldi to allow the reorganization of the Paris-Nord line, which was linked to the construction of the future RER underground station and the north–south link.

=== Ermont - Eaubonne to Champ de Mars line ===
==== The VMI project ====
The 1965 SDAU sketch of the future Réseau Express Régional (RER) included a north–south transverse line connecting Saint-Quentin-en-Yvelines to Cergy-Pontoise via Montparnasse and Saint-Lazare stations. Because of its cost, this link was eventually abandoned, and service to Cergy from Saint-Lazare was provided by a new line branching off at Neuville-sur-Oise. The Montmorency Valley, an urbanized area of 250,000 inhabitants north of Paris, remained without an efficient RER-type service. In the mid-1970s, three lines were studied:

- Saint-Lazare - Argenteuil - Sannois - Ermont-Eaubonne line.
- La Défense - Colombes - Ermont-Eaubonne line.
- RER Line C branch line using abandoned or underused infrastructure between Champ-de-Mars station and Ermont-Eaubonne.

The SNCF developed the VMI project at the beginning of 1977. It was presented to and approved by the Parisian Transport Authority (STP) on September 28, 1977, as a major project under the Special Program. The planned new link includes most of the Ermont- Saint-Ouen-les-Docks line in the north and the Auteuil line in the south. It essentially uses the existing lines, which will be modernized, with the reactivation of the neutralized Boulainvilliers line and the Courcelles line, as well as the construction of a new line at Les Épinettes - the only new section - to connect Petite Ceinture to the Docks line. According to initial studies, the line will be used by forty-five million passengers annually, with an average time saving of eight minutes per journey. It is also estimated that 3,700 users would switch from car to train.

==== Obstacles ====
With the STP's approval, the SNCF could have submitted the project directly to the public utility inquiry. However, due to the public outcry concerning the planned overhead route through the Épinettes district, the SNCF revised the project before submitting it to the inquiry and declaration of public utility at the beginning of 1980. The revised route, which would run in a glass tunnel, was less favorable but would eliminate noise pollution for residents. The City of Paris then expressed concerns about the project, particularly the glass tunnel, which it felt might disrupt the urban fabric. It also requested the covering of the Pereire trench, an idea that had been discussed for some time, as it would enable the city to reclaim surface rights-of-way.

In the spring of 1980, the City of Paris recommended a light covering of the Pereire trench. It rejected the overhead glass tunnel in favor of an underground route at Les Épinettes, which forced the SNCF to revise its plans quickly.

The additional cost of 110 million francs associated with the underground route was a significant concern, prompting public authorities to consider canceling the project. Ultimately, several measures were implemented to mitigate the cost overrun. The development of the underground Porte de Clichy station had been put on hold. Additionally, the SNCF was obliged to sell the Petite Ceinture platform between the Batignolles junction and Boulevard Berthier, which was decommissioned and sold to the City of Paris. This decision has the unfortunate consequence of creating a definitive break in the layout of the Petite Ceinture. The proceeds from selling the Courcelles connection to the City of Paris were transferred to the VMI budget to finance a heavy cover for the Auteuil line. Finally, the decision was made to remove the electrification of the Ermont-Argenteuil branch from the VMI budget and charge it to the suburban network budget. The declaration of public utility was pronounced on September 25, 1981, before the legal deadline for the inquiry.

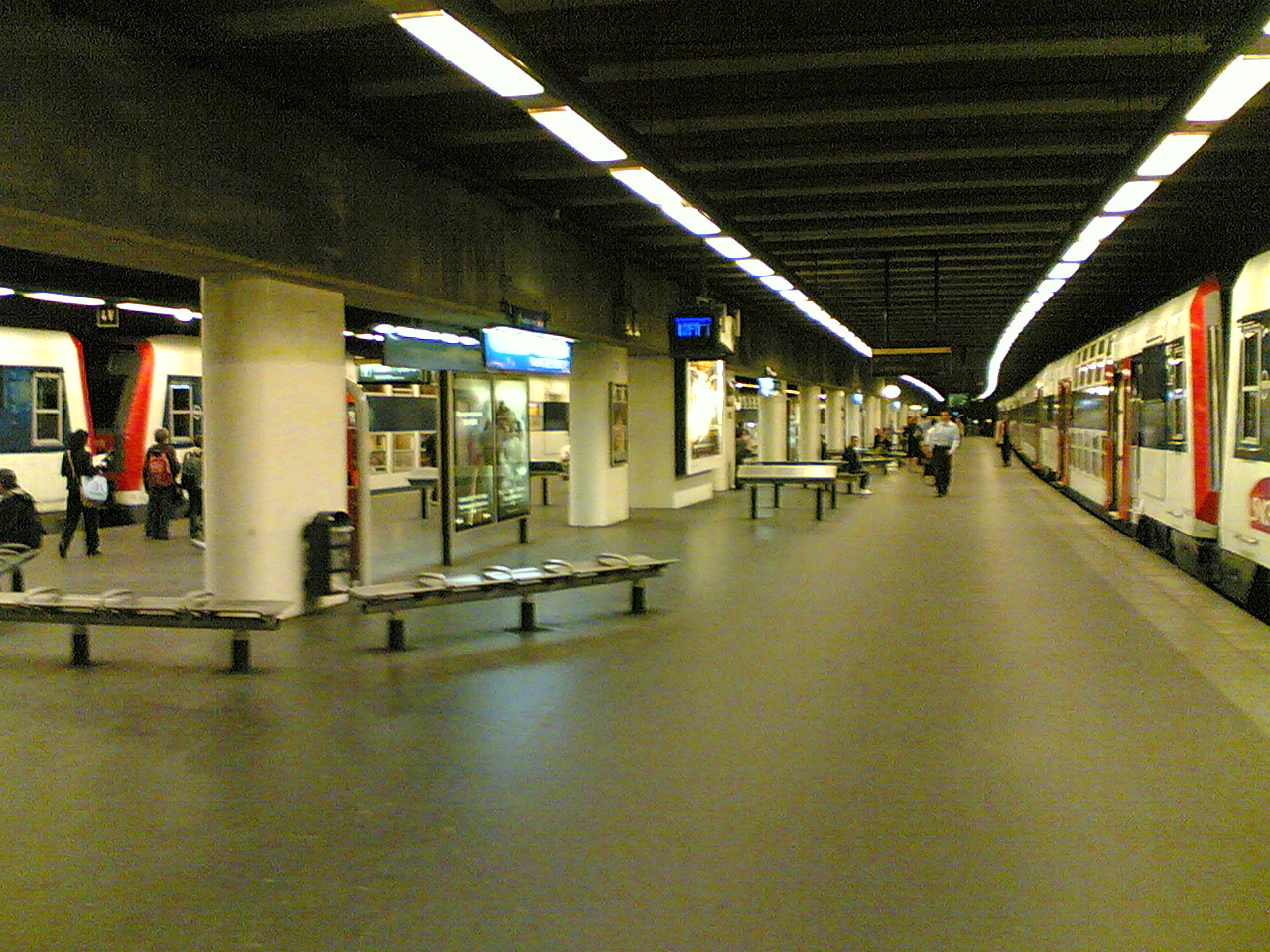
Platforms at Neuilly - Porte Maillot station. Once open-air, a heavy concrete slab has completely covered them since the VMI works.

However, just as the project was nearing completion, the town of Saint-Ouen-sur-Seine expressed its desire for the line to be constructed underground through the commune. With the support of the then Minister of Transport, the Communist Charles Fiterman, the town could force the SNCF to re-examine its project. This resulted in constructing a new station entirely underground, with the route crossing the town via a cut-and-cover method. The project was finally approved in September 1984.

The demands of residents resulted in a tripling of the cost in constant francs, a six-year delay, and an exceptionally mediocre layout and profile, which fell far short of the standard applied to the new infrastructure of RER lines A and B. For instance, inter-station speeds in Paris are restricted to 60 or even 40 km/h, rather than the anticipated 90 km/h. The original plan for the Porte-de-Clichy and Saint-Ouen stations was to construct them at the top of a ramp; however, they now sit in a bowl surrounded by steep ramps, with some reaching 40%.

==== Construction site ====
The modernization of the short Ermont-Argenteuil section with 25 kV electrification was completed ahead of schedule in May 1983 with minimal difficulties. Modernizing the line from La Plaine to Ermont-Eaubonne was a more time-consuming process due to the poor condition of the infrastructure, which was incompatible with a modern interval service. As a result, the entire infrastructure had to be completely upgraded. In 1983, the rail bridges were restored, and the Épinettes junction was removed to construct a cut-and-cover tunnel on the right-of-way. In 1984, the track was entirely replaced from Ermont to Saint-Gratien, with alterations to the track configuration at Ermont-Eaubonne station. In 1985, the section from Saint-Gratien to Saint-Ouen was modernized.

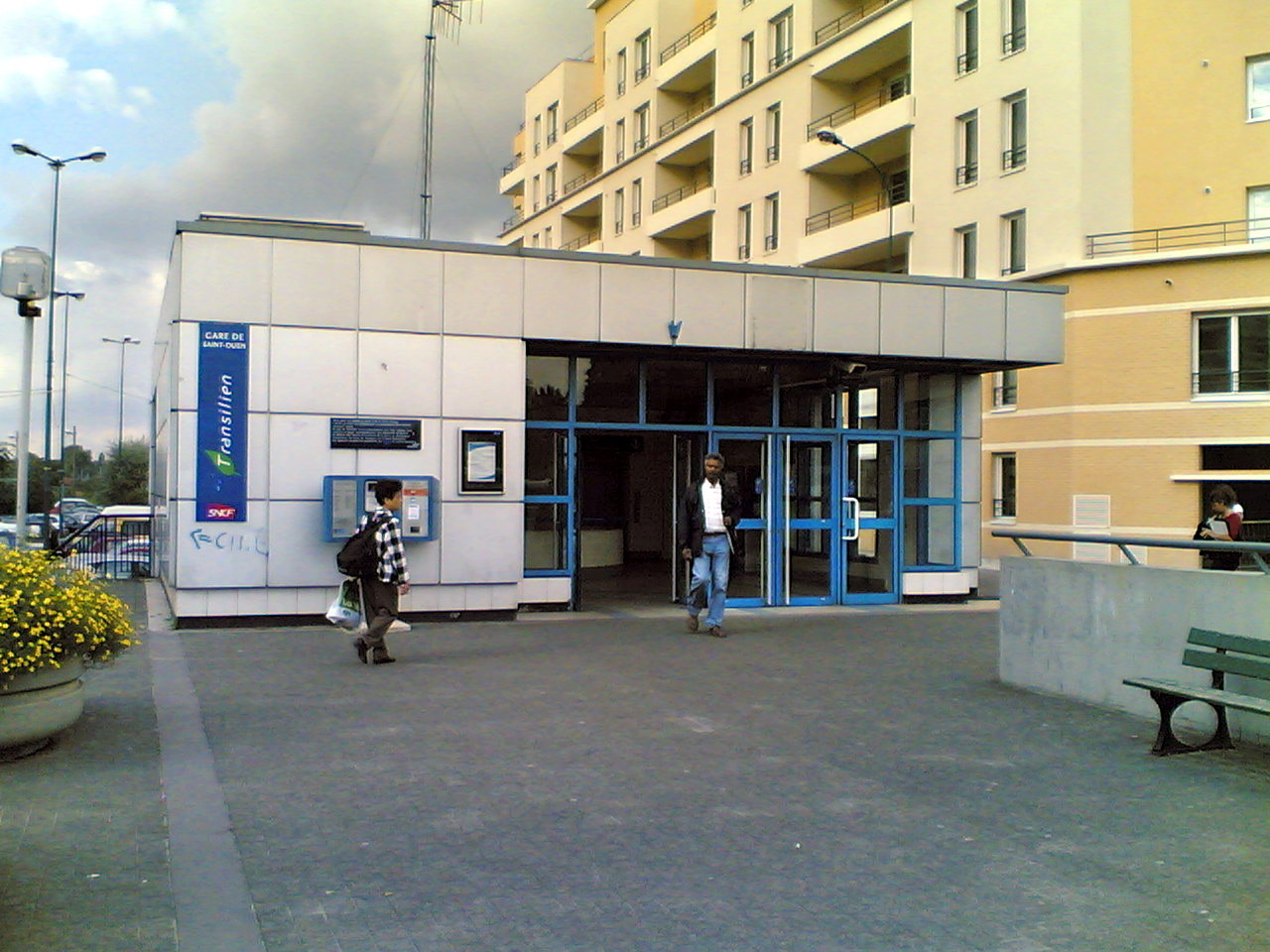
The former passenger building at Saint-Ouen station. Built in 1988 as part of the VMI project, it was replaced in 2020 when line 14 was extended.

The standardized Lartigue Nord block, which was still in place from Gennevilliers to Ermont, was replaced by the automatic lighted block (BAL), which had already been installed on the Gennevilliers to La Chapelle section for the creation of the Saint-Ouen Garibaldi station. The route is equipped with two permanent counter-sense installations (IPCS) and a PRCI-type signal box, which was established at Gennevilliers during the summer of 1987. At the same time, all passenger buildings underwent extensive modernization or reconstruction, with complete renovation of platforms, lighting, shelters, and signage. In 1986, Gennevilliers station was rebuilt 500 m further south to improve connections with other modes of transport, particularly with a potential TCSP between Saint-Denis and Asnières - Gennevilliers. A new passenger building was constructed at Les Grésillons, and a grade separation was built at Saint-Ouen.

The work in Paris presents a particularly delicate challenge. The subsoil is crisscrossed by many different pipes and conduits, which presents a challenge to the work. The reused section of the Auteuil line underwent a complete renovation. The tracks were removed and replaced, the platforms were rebuilt, and the open-air sections were covered with a concrete slab to mitigate noise pollution for residents. However, as A. Jacquot notes, the slabs currently in place around the Avenue Henri-Martin station are utilized as parking lots, which raises concerns about the potential impact of car traffic on the surrounding area. The passenger buildings and underground corridors are undergoing a complete restoration process.

A double-track tunnel is being constructed between the Docks and Auteuil lines. A site has been earmarked for the future construction of Porte de Clichy station. The only remaining component of the Courcelles-Ceinture station between Pereire-Levallois and the Berthier bridge was a single track known as the "voie des Souverains." Following the real estate development along the platform in the 1950s, insufficient space remained to accommodate a UIC-gauge double track, with only fifty centimeters of clearance to provide the necessary width. This lack of foresight resulted in the necessity for extensive work, which commenced in October 1984 and continued until May 1985. To accommodate the electrification gauge, the invert had to be lowered, and the trench had to be widened by rebuilding the old inclined wall. In 1987, the open-air section west of the Berthier bridge was covered with a soundproofing slab used as a parking lot.

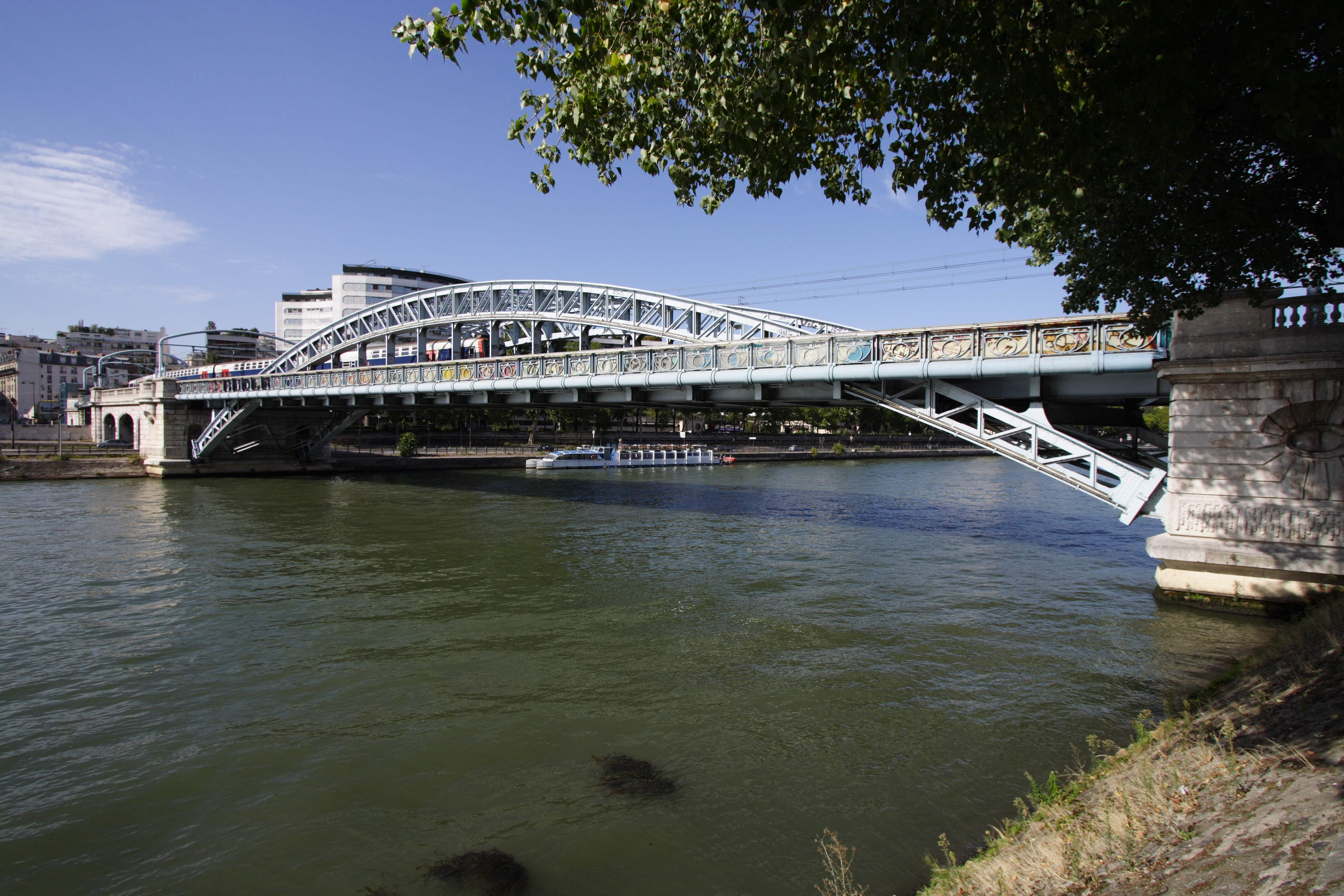
Rouelle bridge, on the main branch of the Seine.

To the south, the viaduct over the Seine, known as the Pont Rouelle, was completely rebuilt in 1982 in the same style as the original, but with a greater air draft for river navigation. The catenary poles were the subject of aesthetic research to ensure a better integration into the landscape. A grade separation has been constructed on the left bank at the Champ-de-Mars junction to prevent track shearing. A concrete formwork encloses the grade separation to mitigate noise pollution for residents. However, it is much quieter than the permanent noise caused by heavy road traffic on the platforms. Finally, the line is equipped with BAL with IPCS.

The northern section from Saint-Ouen to Ermont is on schedule. However, complex construction in Paris is delaying work on the Saint-Ouen to Champ-de-Mars section, which is also linked to the discontinuation of service on the Auteuil line, effective January 7, 1985, with replacement by a shuttle bus.

==== The commissioning process ====
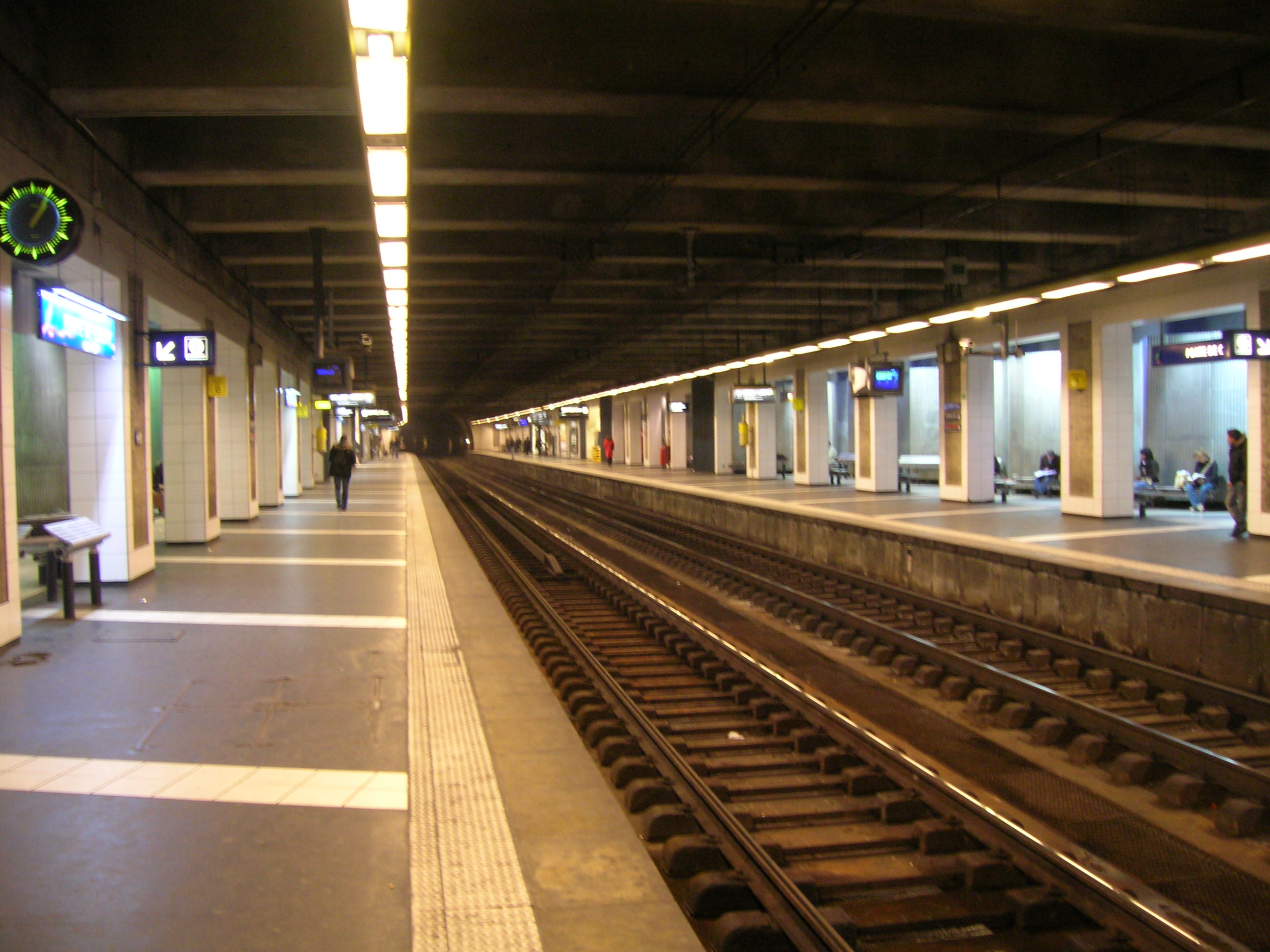
Porte de Clichy station, opened in September 1991.

The Paris-Sud-Ouest region is responsible for managing the new route up to the section that separates the two supply voltages at Saint-Ouen. Beyond that point, the Paris-Nord region will oversee operations. The line's mileage is harmonized from KP 0 at Gare des Invalides to Argenteuil at KP 25.428 km via Ermont. The Porte de Clichy station, whose construction had been delayed due to lack of funding, commenced operations in September 1991.

On August 28, 2000, the Montigny - Beauchamp to Pontoise route was extended to Val-d'Oise, Pontoise, using the Saint-Denis to Pontoise line. On August 27, 2006, as part of the direct link from Paris-Saint-Lazare to Ermont-Eaubonne, line C lost its short Argenteuil branch (C3). The northern terminus of the C3 branch was subsequently relocated to Montigny-Beauchamp.

== Traffic ==
Upon its initial launch, the VMI was serviced by a quarter-hourly omnibus train throughout the day. These trains were operated by Z 8800 railcars, alternating between Argenteuil and Montigny-Beauchamp, Pont de Rungis, and Massy-Palaiseau. To accommodate increased demand during peak periods, semi-direct quarter-hourly services were introduced to the schedule the following year. Trains from Ermont - Eaubonne to Pereire - Levallois, then Porte de Clichy, commenced operation in 1991. These services run non-stop from Montigny - Beauchamp - Brétigny, while trains from Argenteuil provide a quarter-hourly omnibus service, offering eight trains per hour in each direction.

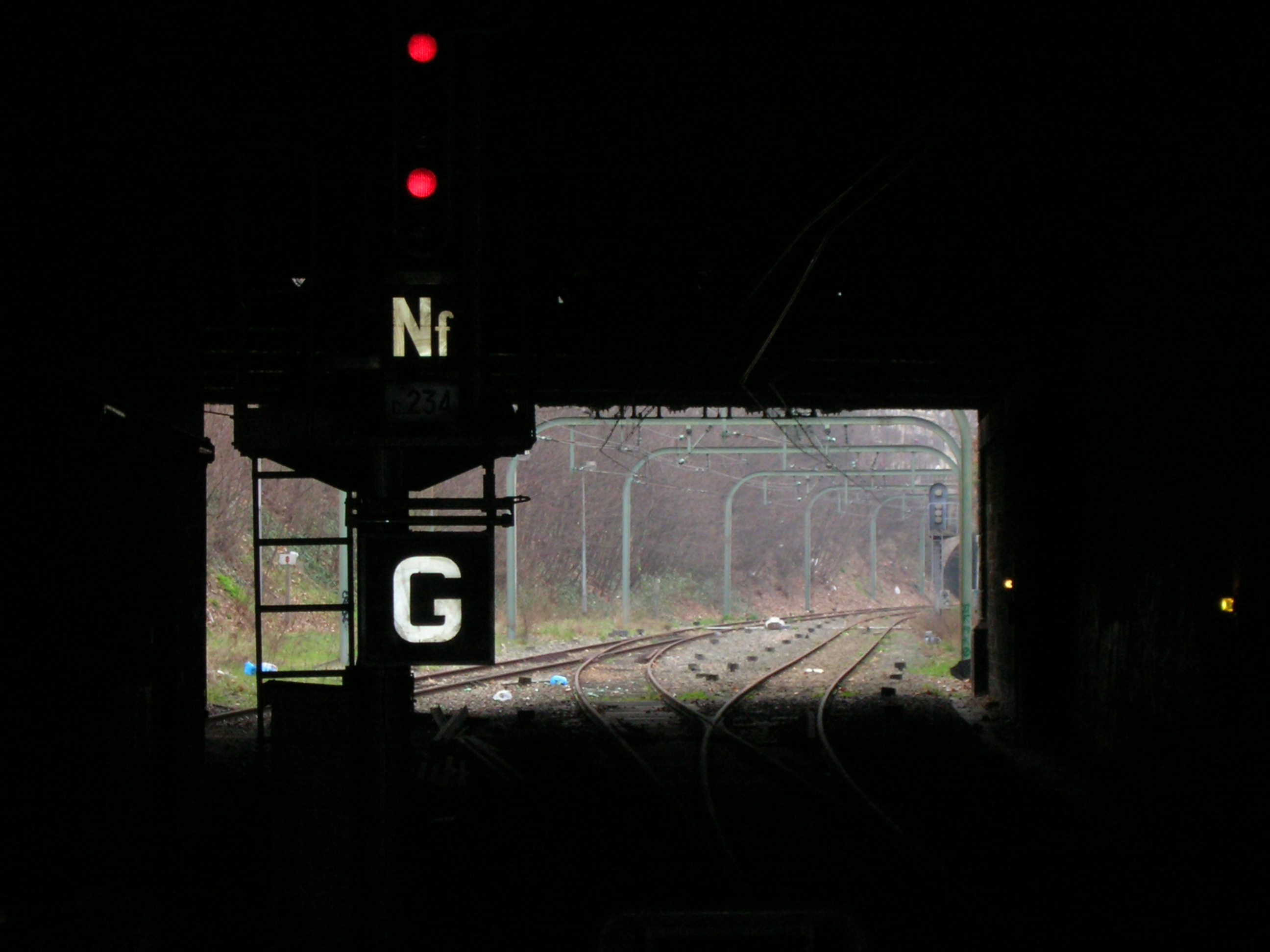
The tracks seen from the Pereire - Levallois station towards Pont-Cardinet.

The short Pereire - Pont-Cardinet section (800 m) is served on a quarter-hourly basis, a significant improvement over the previous service, which saw a train every ten minutes before 1985 when the Auteuil line was in operation. The current service is provided by a single Z 5300 shuttle, which runs daily unladen from the Ardoines depot in the southern suburbs. However, traffic has declined rapidly, dropping below the expected 1,500 daily passengers.

Initially, SNCF suspended the shuttle service at weekends, with a replacement bus running every ten minutes. Subsequently, on July 5, 1996, the rail link, which used a high-capacity self-propelled unit and staff for very little traffic, was discontinued due to a lack of passengers.

The line's profile presents certain challenges, both in terms of its longitudinal and plan characteristics. Its underground section features short-radius curves (well under 500 meters) and very steep ramps, with gradients reaching 40 ‰. These characteristics also limit speed to 100 km/h in the suburbs (Note: Speed limit: 60 km/h in the tunnel to Saint-Ouen, 100 km/h from the Saint-Ouen junction to Saint-Gratien, and 80 km/h from Saint-Gratien to Ermont - Eaubonne (90 km/h in the other direction on that section).) and 60 km/h at best in Paris. (Note: Speed limit: 60 km/h in tunnel. There are 50 km/h zones from Avenue du Président Kennedy to the Boulainvilliers exit, then from the Pereire—Levallois exit to Porte de Clichy. In the other direction, there are 50 km/h zones under the Paris-Saint-Lazare tracks (between Porte de Clichy and Pereire), then from the Boulainvilliers IPCS entrance to the Champ de Mars quay entrance.)

== Bibliography ==
- Jacquot, André (1987). 130 ans de trains sur la ligne d'Auteuil (in French). Éditions de l'Ormet. ISBN 9782906575011.
- Jacquot, André (1989). La ligne C du RER (in French). Éditions de l'Ormet. ISBN 978-2906575035.
- Carrière, Bruno (1997). Les trains de banlieue (in French). Vol. 1. Éd. La Vie du rail & des transports. ISBN 978-2902808663.
- Collardey, Bernard (1999). Les trains de banlieue (in French). La Vie du rail & des transports. ISBN 978-2902808762.
- Bulletin des lois de la République Française (1873). Décret qui autorise la substitution de la Compagnie du Chemin de fer du Nord aux droits et obligations de la Société anonyme du Chemin de fer et des Docks de Saint-Ouen, en ce qui concerne le Chemin de fer de raccordement de la gare d'eau de Saint-Ouen au Chemin de Ceinture (in French). Paris: Imprimerie nationale des lois. pp. 956–957.

== See also ==
=== Related articles ===
- Chemin de fer de Petite Ceinture
- RER C
- Rail transport in France
- List of railway lines in France
