= Canton of Ermont =

Coordinates: 48.99°N 2.26°E

The canton of Ermont is an administrative division of the Val-d'Oise department, Île-de-France region, northern France. Its borders were modified at the French canton reorganisation which came into effect in March 2015. Its seat is in Ermont.

It consists of the following communes:

1. Eaubonne
2. Ermont
