= Hôtel de Ville, Ermont =

Town hall in Ermont, France

Hôtel de Ville
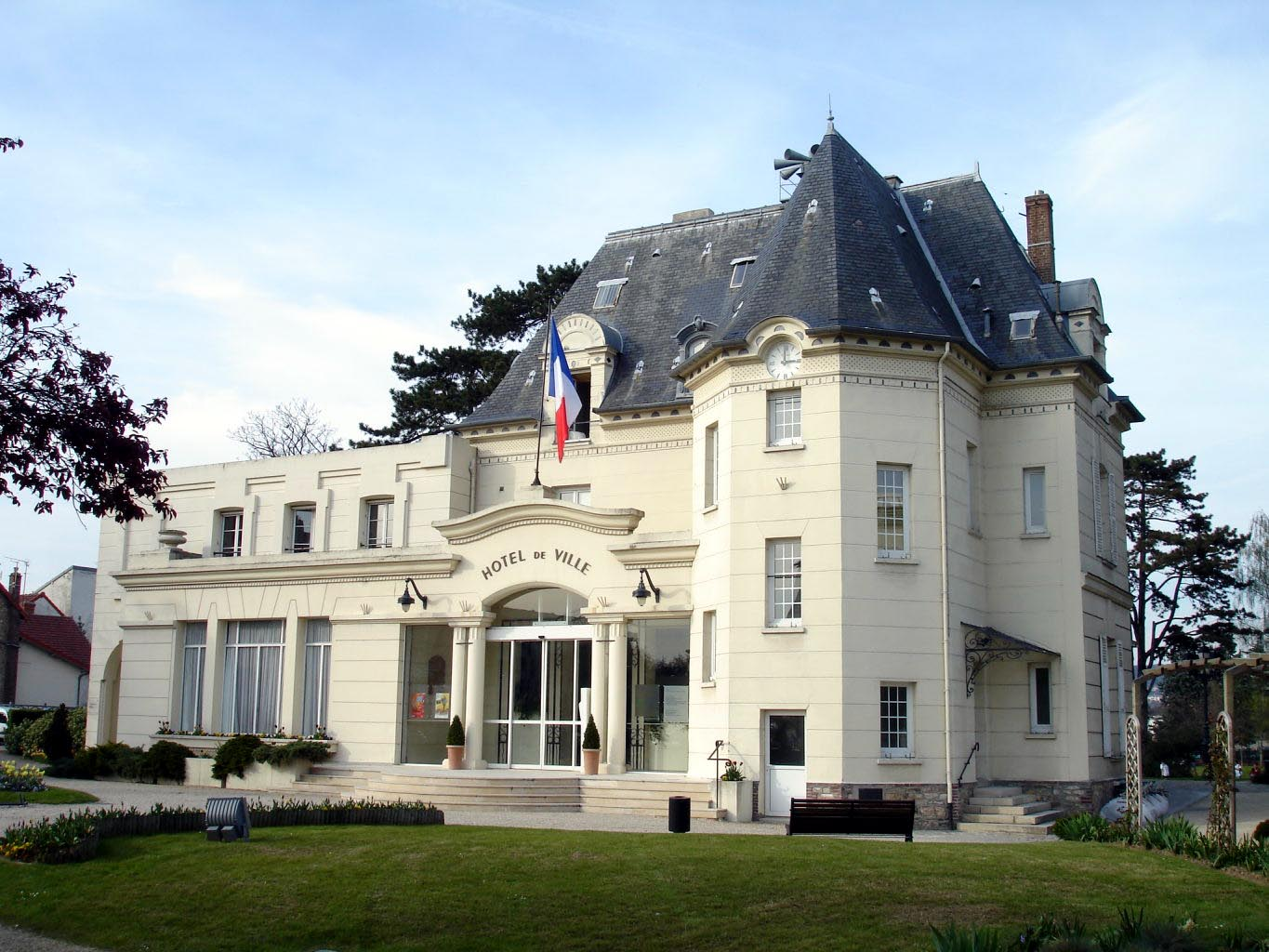
- The main frontage of the Hôtel de Ville in April 2007
- Interactive map of the Hôtel de Ville area

General information
- Type: City hall
- Architectural style: Neoclassical style
- Location: Ermont, France
- Coordinates: 48.9919°N 2.2588°E
- Completed: 1868

The Hôtel de Ville (French pronunciation: [otɛl də vil], City Hall) is a municipal building in Ermont, Val-d'Oise, in the northern suburbs of Paris, standing on Rue Louis Savoie.

== History ==
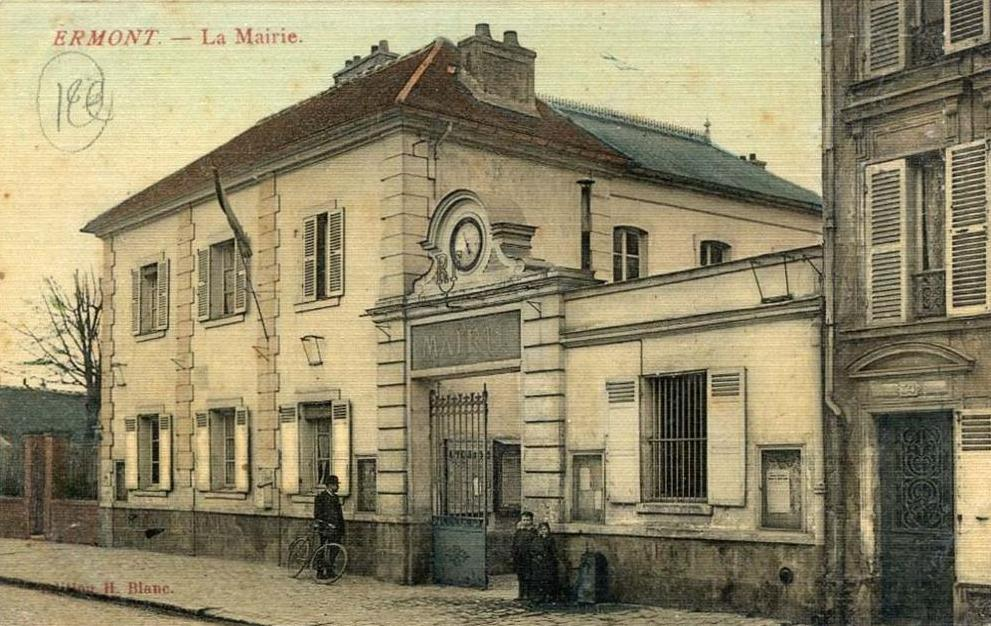
The old town hall

Following the French Revolution, the town council initially met in the house of the mayor at that time. This arrangement continued until the mid-19th century, when the town council led by the mayor, Benjamin Blanchard, decided to establish a combined town hall and school. The building they selected was on Rue de Sannois (now Rue de Stalingrad). The building was designed in the neoclassical style, built in ashlar stone and had been completed in 1832. The design involved a symmetrical main frontage of three bays facing onto Rue de Sannois. It was fenestrated by casement windows on both floors.

The council acquired the building from Sieur Binot de Villiers for FFr 35,322 in May 1864 and subsequently converted it for municipal use: the front part of the building became schoolmaster's residence, the section behind it became the classrooms, while the section at the back accommodated the town hall staff. The municipal rooms were accessed through a gateway, which was surmounted by a clock, to the right of the main frontage.

The building was solely used as a town hall from 1902 when the pupils moved to a new school (now Collège Jules Ferry) on Rue Maurice Berteaux. After it was no longer required for municipal use, the building became the l'Espace Seniors Anatole France (the Anatole France community centre). The name of the centre commemorated the life of the poet, journalist, and novelist, Anatole France, who was awarded the Nobel Prize in Literature in 1921.

In the early 1930s, following significant population growth, the council led by the mayor, Camille Clément, decided to acquire a more substantial property. The building they selected was a large villa on Rue Louis Savoie. The building had been commissioned by the mayor, Benjamin Blanchard, as a private residence. It was designed in the neoclassical style, built in ashlar stone and was completed in 1868. The original design involved a main frontage of four bays facing onto Rue Louis Savoie with the second bay on the right formed by an octagonal section which was projected forward. The building was fenestrated by casement windows on both floors and surmounted by a steep Châteauesque-style roof. After Blanchard died, the house was acquired by the Lévy family. The council bought the building in 1932 and then instituted a major programme of conversion works, including the construction of a single-storey extension, accommodating the Salle des Mariages (wedding room), to the immediate west of the original building, and a single-storey entrance foyer, in front of it, all to a design by the architect, Sieur Poissenot. Following completion of the works, the enlarged building was officially opened on 30 July 1933. An extra floor was added later, above the wedding room, to a design by the architect, Sieur Barranger.
