= Ermont =

- Commune
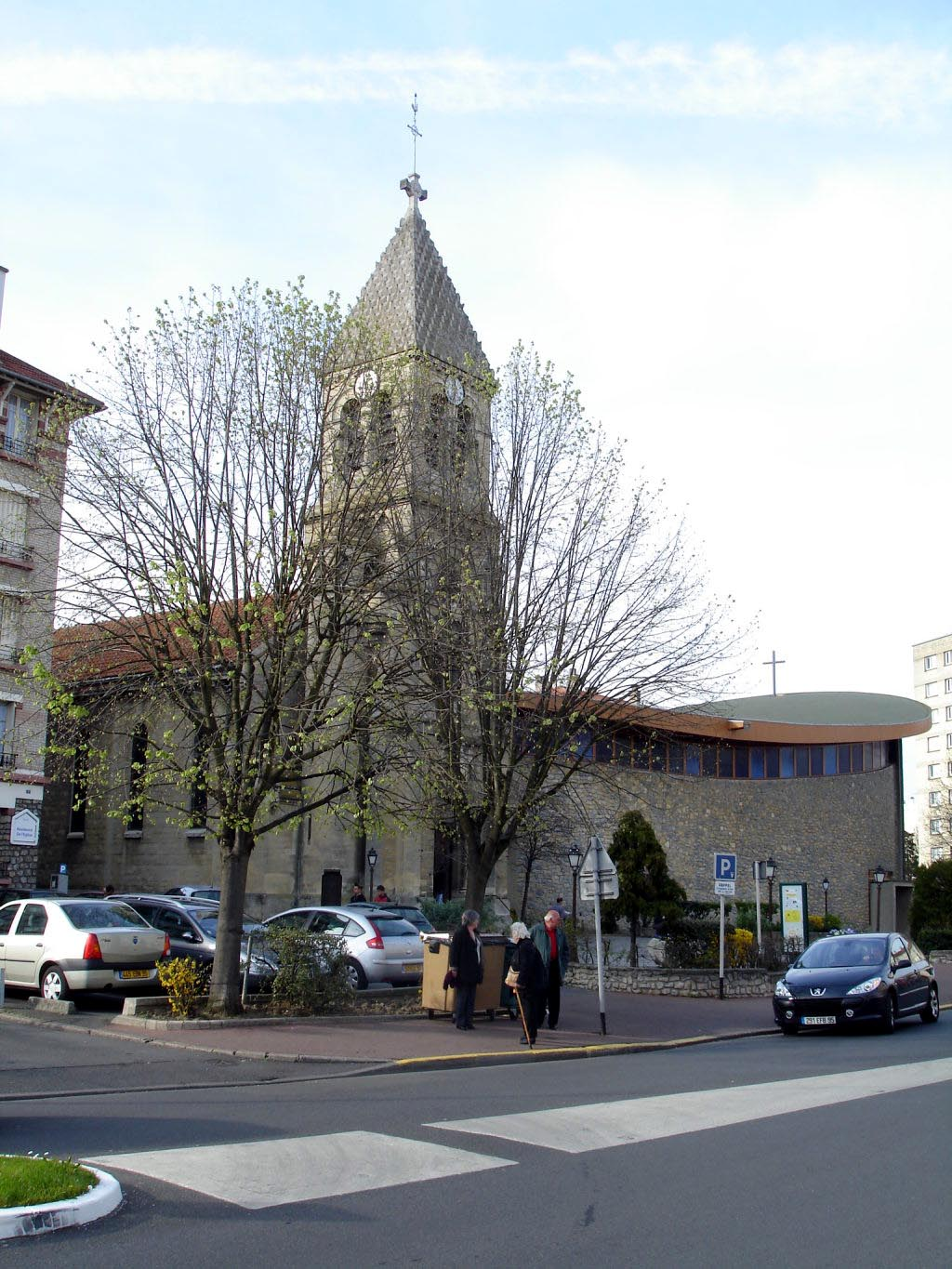
- The church of Saint-Flaive, in Ermont

- Coat of arms

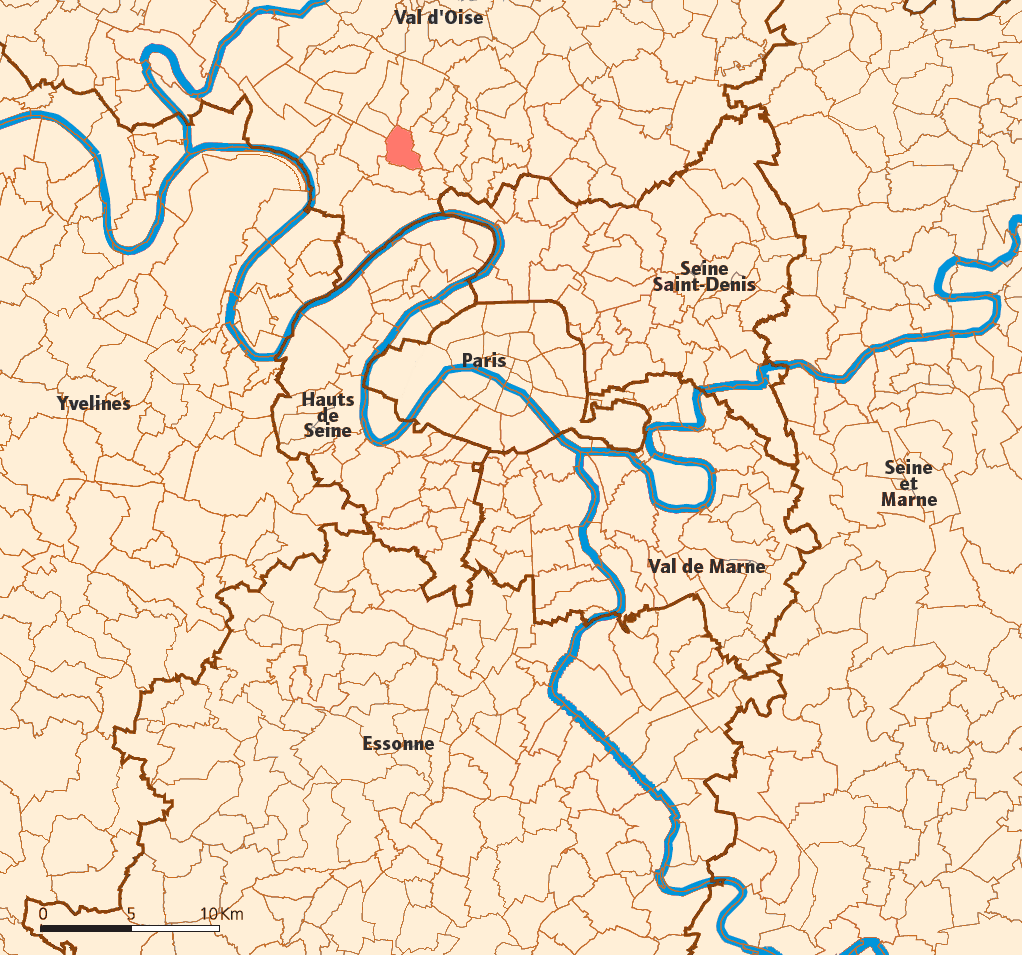
- Location (in red) within Paris inner and outer suburbs
- Location of Ermont
- Location within France Location within Île-de-France (region)
- Coordinates: 48°59′32″N 2°15′37″E
- Country: France
- Region: Île-de-France
- Department: Val-d'Oise
- Arrondissement: Argenteuil
- Canton: Ermont
- Intercommunality: CA Val Parisis

Government
  - Mayor (2020–2026): Xavier Haquin
- Area^{1}: 4.16 km^{2} (1.61 sq mi)
- Highest elevation: 65 m (213 ft)
- Lowest elevation: 43 m (141 ft)
- Population (2023): 29,489
  - Density: 7,090/km^{2} (18,400/sq mi)
- Demonym: Ermontois·e
- Time zone: UTC+01:00 (CET)
  - Summer (DST): UTC+02:00 (CEST)
- INSEE/Postal code: 95219 /95120
- ^{1} French Land Register data, which excludes lakes, ponds, glaciers > 1 km^{2} (0.386 sq mi or 247 acres) and river estuaries.

Ermont (French pronunciation: [ɛʁmɔ̃]) is a commune in the Val-d'Oise department, in the northern suburbs of Paris, France. It is located 17.2 km (10.7 mi) from the center of Paris. It has around 29,000 inhabitants, which makes Ermont one of the most important cities in Val d'Oise. Ermont has experienced rapid urbanization thanks to railway transport and industrialization, with the population of Ermont being just 9,000 after the Second World War.

== History ==
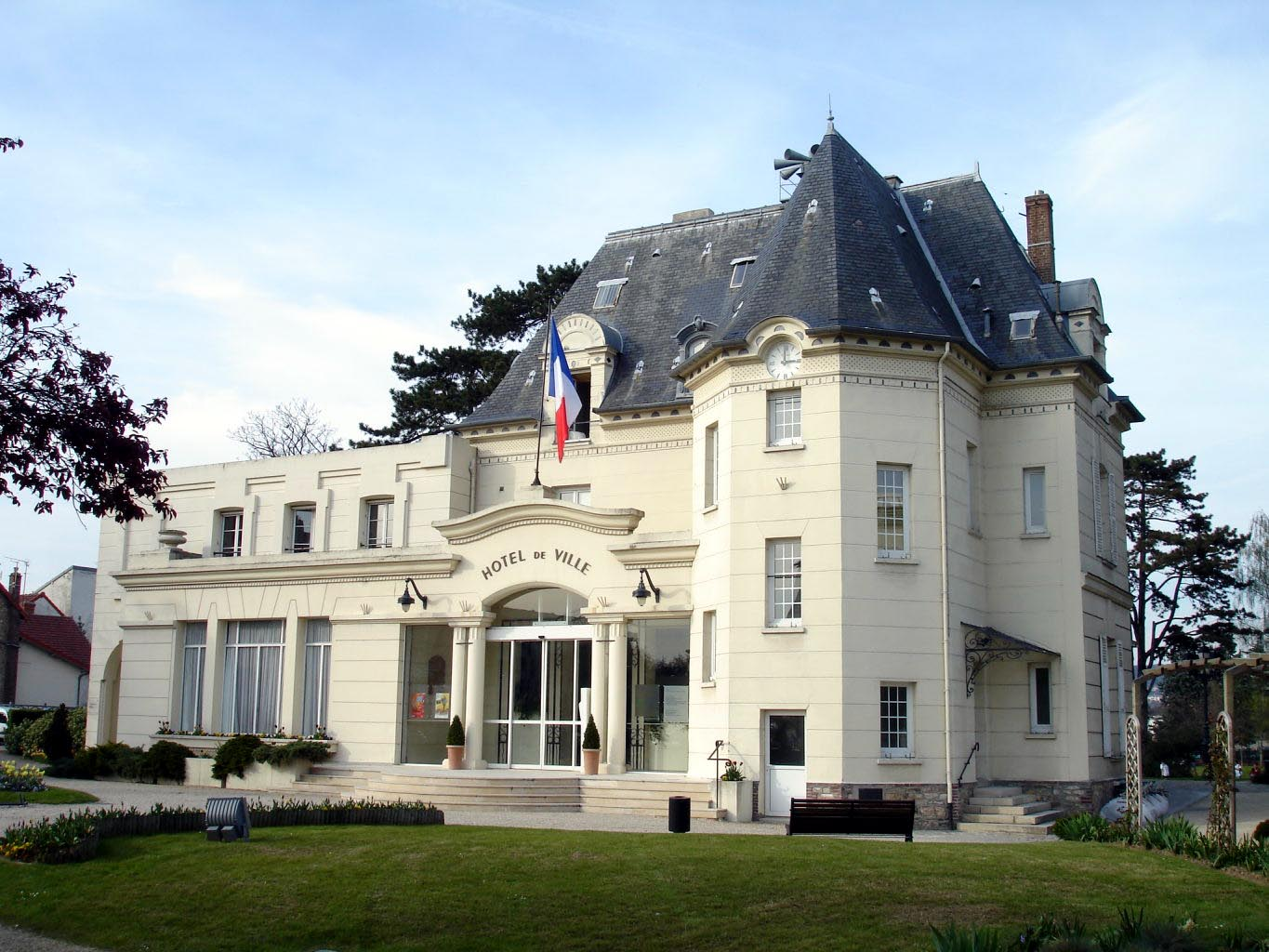
The Hôtel de Ville

The Hôtel de Ville was built as a private residence and completed in 1868.

== Population ==
Historical population

| Year | Pop. | ±% p.a. |
|---|---|---|
| 1793 | 518 | — |
| 1800 | 513 | −0.14% |
| 1806 | 574 | +1.89% |
| 1821 | 506 | −0.84% |
| 1831 | 580 | +1.37% |
| 1836 | 548 | −1.13% |
| 1841 | 522 | −0.97% |
| 1846 | 582 | +2.20% |
| 1851 | 587 | +0.17% |
| 1856 | 643 | +1.84% |
| 1861 | 647 | +0.12% |
| 1866 | 792 | +4.13% |
| 1872 | 1,065 | +5.06% |
| 1876 | 1,106 | +0.95% |
| 1881 | 1,320 | +3.60% |
| 1886 | 1,609 | +4.04% |
| 1891 | 1,683 | +0.90% |
| 1896 | 2,304 | +6.48% |
| 1901 | 3,101 | +6.12% |

| Year | Pop. | ±% p.a. |
|---|---|---|
| 1906 | 3,717 | +3.69% |
| 1911 | 4,647 | +4.57% |
| 1921 | 5,658 | +1.99% |
| 1926 | 7,110 | +4.67% |
| 1931 | 8,316 | +3.18% |
| 1936 | 8,812 | +1.17% |
| 1946 | 9,325 | +0.57% |
| 1954 | 11,068 | +2.17% |
| 1962 | 19,263 | +7.17% |
| 1968 | 23,842 | +3.62% |
| 1975 | 25,492 | +0.96% |
| 1982 | 24,394 | −0.63% |
| 1990 | 27,947 | +1.71% |
| 1999 | 27,494 | −0.18% |
| 2007 | 27,670 | +0.08% |
| 2012 | 27,352 | −0.23% |
| 2017 | 29,108 | +1.25% |
| 2023 | 29,489 | +0.22% |

Source: EHESS and INSEE (1968-2023)

== Transport ==
Ermont is served by Ermont–Eaubonne station which is an interchange station on Paris RER line C, on the Transilien Paris-Nord suburban rail line, and on the Transilien Paris-Saint-Lazare suburban rail line.

Ermont is also served by Cernay station which is an interchange station on Paris RER line C and on the Transilien Paris-Nord suburban rail line.

Finally, Ermont is also served by two stations on the Transilien Paris – Nord suburban rail line: Ermont-Halte and Gros Noyer–Saint-Prix.

== Personalities ==
- Anita Conti, explorer and photographer,
- Marc Foucan, athlete
- Yvonne Lefébure, concert pianist and teacher
- Pierre Leyris, translator
- Landing Sané, basketball player
- DJ Snake, DJ and record producer
- Alice Taglioni, actress

== Twin towns and sister cities ==
Ermont is twinned with:

- Adria, Italy
- Banbury, England, United Kingdom
- Lampertheim, Germany
- Loja, Spain
- Longwan (Wenzhou), China
- Maldegem, Belgium
- Świdnica, Poland

== See also ==
- Communes of the Val-d'Oise department
- Raymond Couvègnes
