= Ermont–Eaubonne station =

French railway station

Ermont–Eaubonne
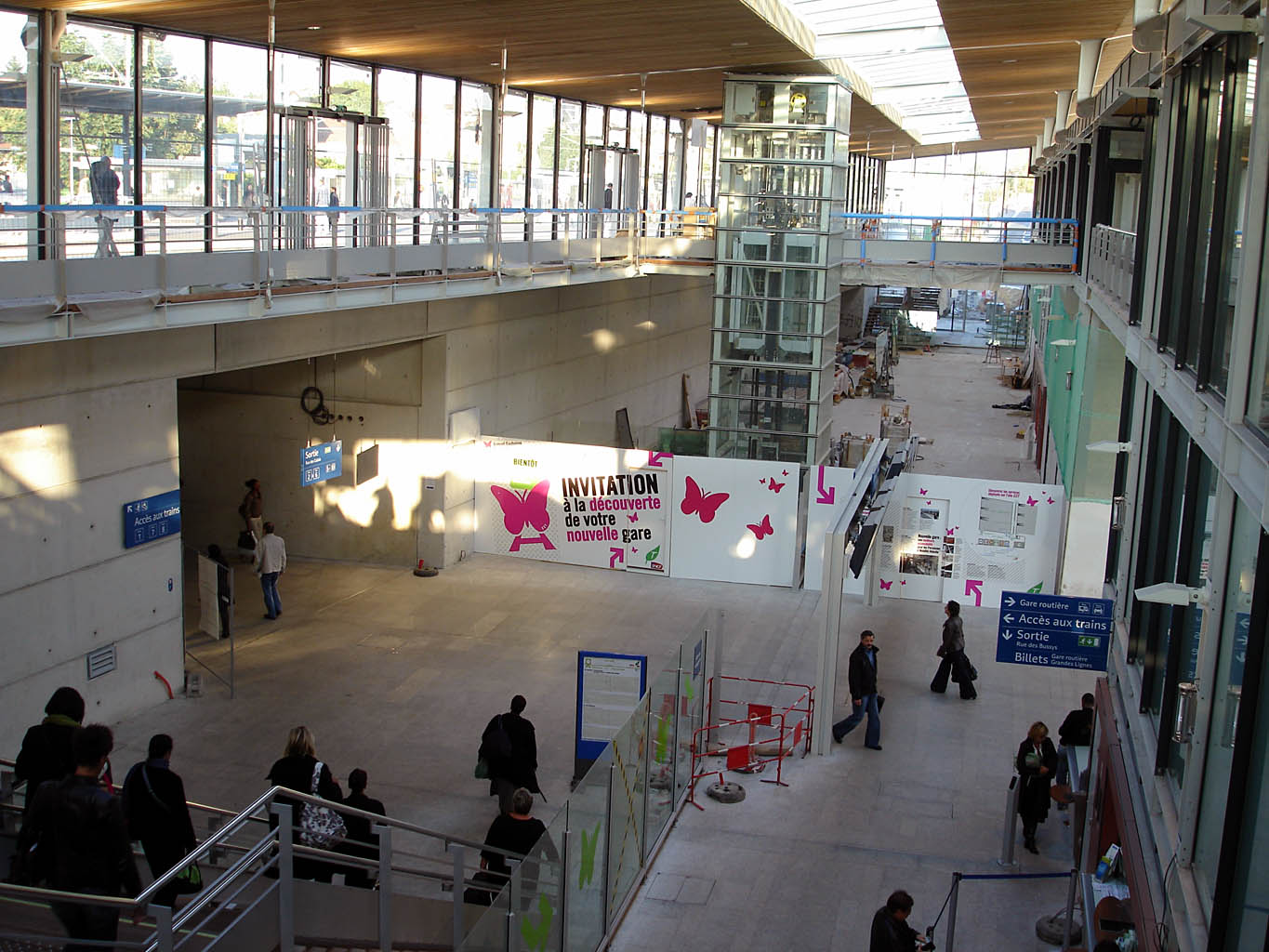
- Ermont–Eaubonne railway station

General information
- Location: Ermont, Val-d'Oise, Île-de-France, France
- Coordinates: 48°58′50″N 2°16′18″E
- Lines: Saint-Denis–Dieppe railway, VMI line RER C

Other information
- Station code: 87276055

Passengers
- 2024: 23,481,126

Services
Preceding station	RER	Following station
Cernay towards Pontoise	RER C	Saint-Gratien towards Massy-Palaiseau, Dourdan-la-Forêt or Saint-Martin-d'Étampes
Preceding station	Transilien	Following station
Champ de courses d'Enghien towards Paris-Nord	Line H	Cernay towards Pontoise
Champ de courses d'Enghien towards Paris-Nord	Line H	Ermont-Halte towards Persan–Beaumont
Sannois towards Paris-St.-Lazare	Line J	Terminus
Location

Ermont–Eaubonne is a railway station between Ermont and Eaubonne, in the department of Val-d'Oise, France. It is an interchange station for commuter traffic in the northwestern suburbs of Paris. It is situated on the railway from Paris to Pontoise, and branch lines towards Valmondois, Argenteuil and Saint-Ouen. With 23 million passengers per year (2024), it is the busiest station of Val-d'Oise.

== Lines serving this station ==
- RER Line C
- SNCF Ermont–Eaubonne–Persan Beaumont
- SNCF Gare du Nord (Banlieue)–Persan-Beaumont
- SNCF Gare du Nord (Banlieue)–Pontoise
- SNCF Gare du Nord (Banlieue)–Saint-Leu-la-forêt
- SNCF Gare du Nord (Banlieue)–Valmondois
- SNCF Gare Saint-Lazare (Banlieue)–Ermont–Eaubonne (Terminus)

Station diagram

== See also ==
- List of stations of the Paris RER
