= Franconville, Val-d'Oise =

Franconville
- Commune
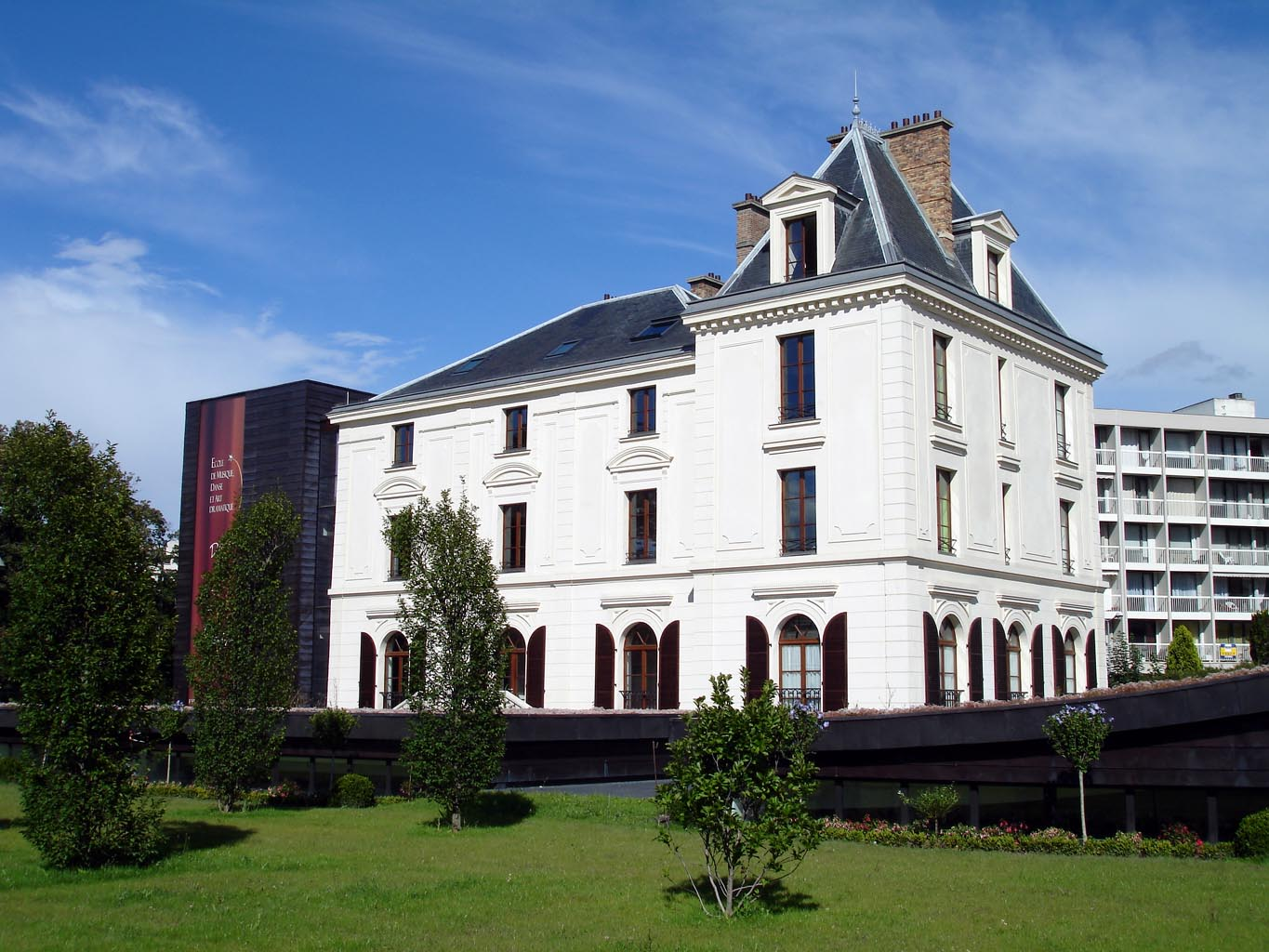
- Maison Suger (Municipal Music School)

- Coat of arms

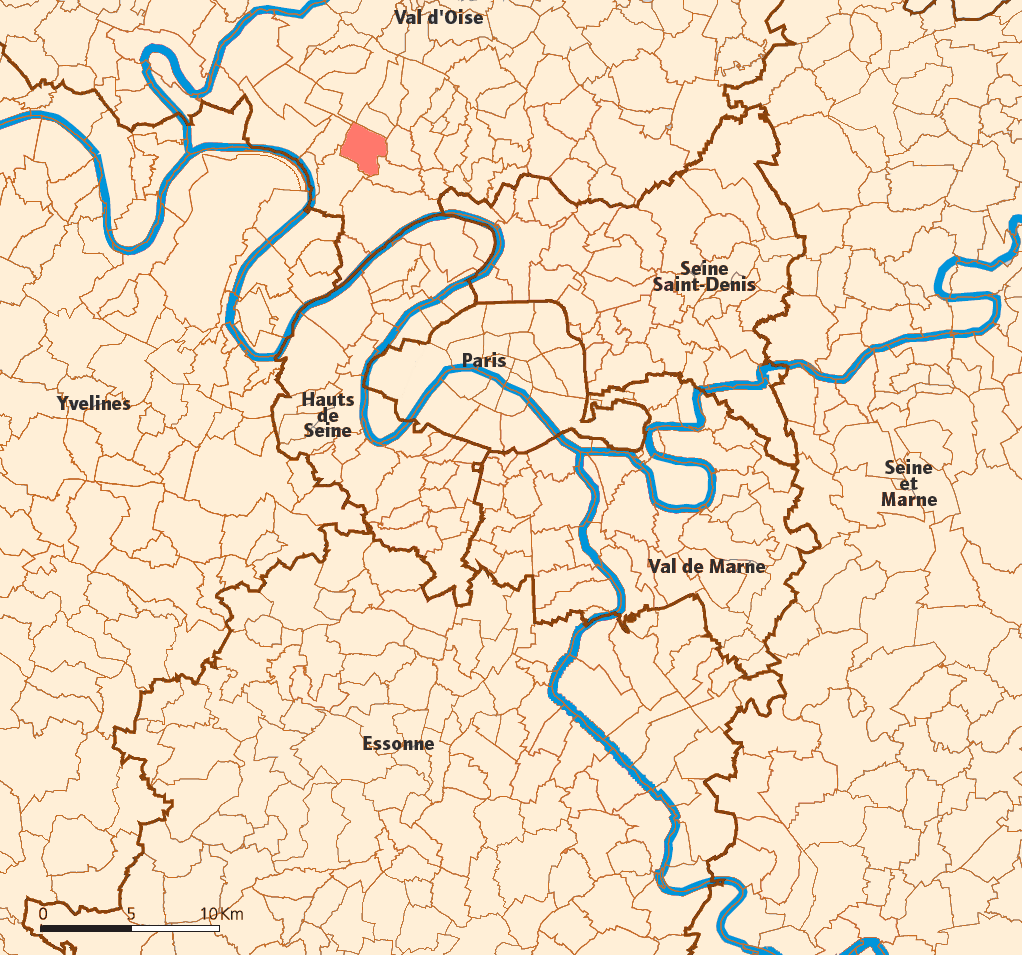
- Location (in red) within Paris inner and outer suburbs
- Location of Franconville
- Location within France Location within Île-de-France (region)
- Coordinates: 48°59′20″N 2°13′53″E
- Country: France
- Region: Île-de-France
- Department: Val-d'Oise
- Arrondissement: Argenteuil
- Canton: Franconville
- Intercommunality: CA Val Parisis

Government
  - Mayor (2020–2026): Xavier Melki
- Area^{1}: 6.19 km^{2} (2.39 sq mi)
- Highest elevation: 167 m (548 ft)
- Lowest elevation: 54 m (177 ft)
- Population (2023): 37,754
  - Density: 6,100/km^{2} (15,800/sq mi)
- Time zone: UTC+01:00 (CET)
  - Summer (DST): UTC+02:00 (CEST)
- INSEE/Postal code: 95252 /
- ^{1} French Land Register data, which excludes lakes, ponds, glaciers > 1 km^{2} (0.386 sq mi or 247 acres) and river estuaries.

Franconville (French pronunciation: [fʁɑ̃kɔ̃vil]) is a commune in the Val-d'Oise department in Île-de-France in northern France. It is a northwestern suburb of Paris, located 17.1 km. (10.6 miles) from the center of Paris.

== Toponymy ==
The name Franconville derives from the Latin Francorum villa, meaning the 'town of the Franks'.

== History ==
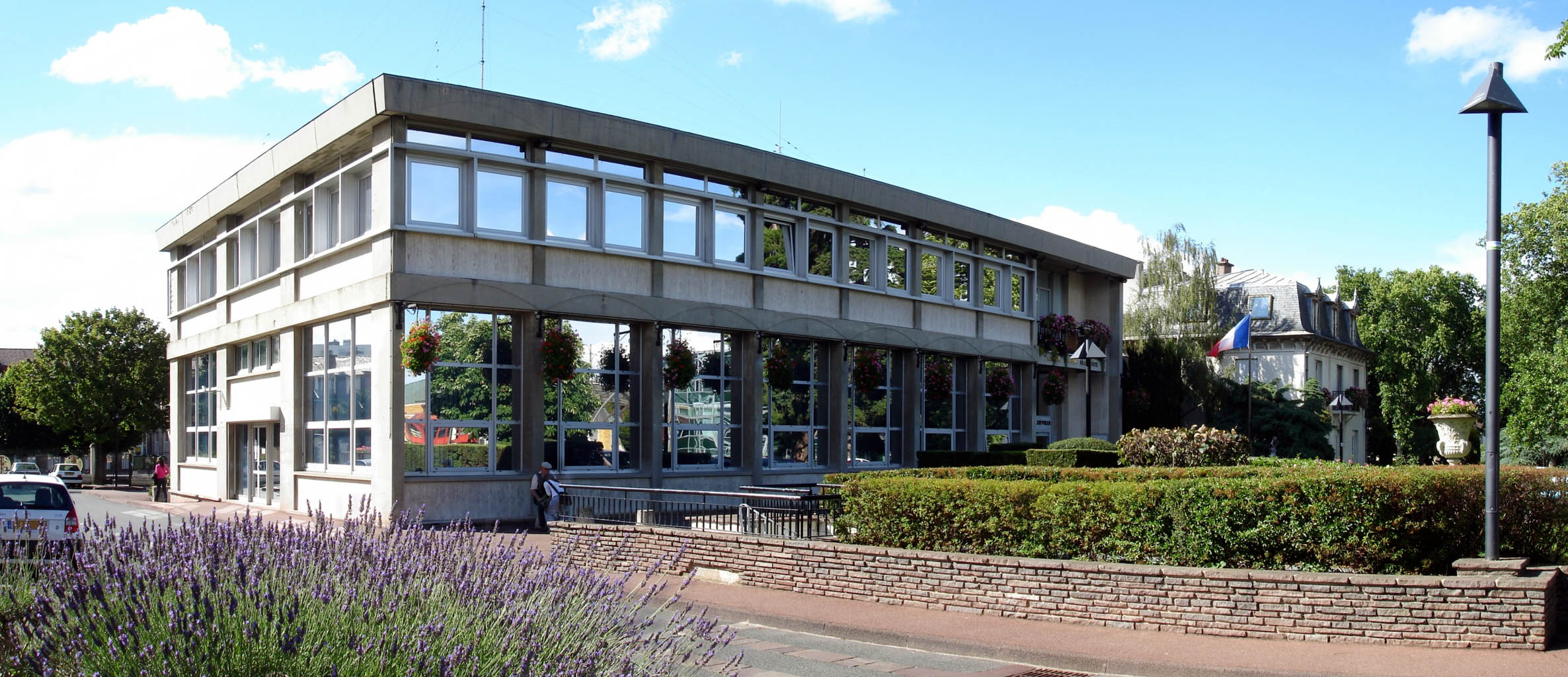
The Hôtel de Ville

The current Hôtel de Ville was completed in 1968.

== Population ==
Historical population

Year	Pop.	±% p.a.
1793	1,082	—
1800	1,016	−0.90%
1806	1,005	−0.18%
1821	1,124	+0.75%
1831	1,193	+0.60%
1836	1,152	−0.70%
1841	1,248	+1.61%
1846	1,222	−0.42%
1851	1,154	−1.14%
1856	1,092	−1.10%
1861	1,147	+0.99%
1866	1,207	+1.02%
1872	1,300	+1.24%
1876	1,352	+0.99%
1881	1,431	+1.14%
1886	1,525	+1.28%
1891	1,518	−0.09%
1896	1,640	+1.56%
1901	1,779	+1.64%

Year	Pop.	±% p.a.
1906	2,188	+4.23%
1911	2,869	+5.57%
1921	3,498	+2.00%
1926	4,934	+7.12%
1931	6,278	+4.94%
1936	6,151	−0.41%
1946	6,130	−0.03%
1954	7,697	+2.89%
1962	11,185	+4.78%
1968	16,205	+6.37%
1975	24,231	+5.92%
1982	32,948	+4.49%
1990	33,802	+0.32%
1999	33,497	−0.10%
2007	32,932	−0.21%
2012	33,196	+0.16%
2017	36,762	+2.06%
2023	37,754	+0.44%

Source: EHESS and INSEE (1968-2023)

== Transport ==
Franconville is served by Franconville – Le Plessis-Bouchard station on Paris RER line C and on the Transilien Paris-Nord suburban rail line.

== Twin towns ==
- Viernheim, Hesse, Germany (since 1966)
- Potters Bar, Hertfordshire, England, United Kingdom (since 1973)
- Mława, Poland (since 2023)

== Personalities ==
=== Culture ===
- Jean Daudin, French canon, translator of humanist and Italian poet Petrarch, was born in Franconville.
- Marcel L'Enfant(1884-1963), post-impressionist painter has lived and worked Chaussée Jules-César in Franconville for 40 years (1923-1963).
- André Vaquier (1886-1976), librarian and historian, has lived in Franconville for many years.
- Jean Daurand (1913-1989), actor, had a Café named Les Cinq Dernières Minutes in Franconville.
- Hassan Koubba (born 1973), actor.
- Lorie, singer and actress.
- Massacra (1987-1997], Death Metal band.

=== Sports ===
- Stéphane Diagana (born 1969) was a member of an athletic club in Franconville.
- Éric Rabésandratana (born 1972]), football-player (Paris-Saint-Germain), was a player in the FC Franconville Plessis Bouchard team.
- Bouchra Ghezielle (born 1979]), athlete
- Mickaël Hanany (born 1983]), high-jumper
- David Alerte (born 1984]), sprinter
- David Ngog (born 1989]), football player in Liverpool FC

=== Science ===
- Antoine-Alexis Cadet de Vaux ( 1743-1828]), chemist, philanthropist.
- Jean-François Clervoy (born 1958]), astronaut.
- Gustave-Joseph Witkowski (1844-1922), doctor.

=== Religion ===
- Jacques Baudoin (1630-1715), priest.

== See also ==
- Communes of the Val-d'Oise department
