= Léon Lacombe =

French anarchist, criminal and murderer

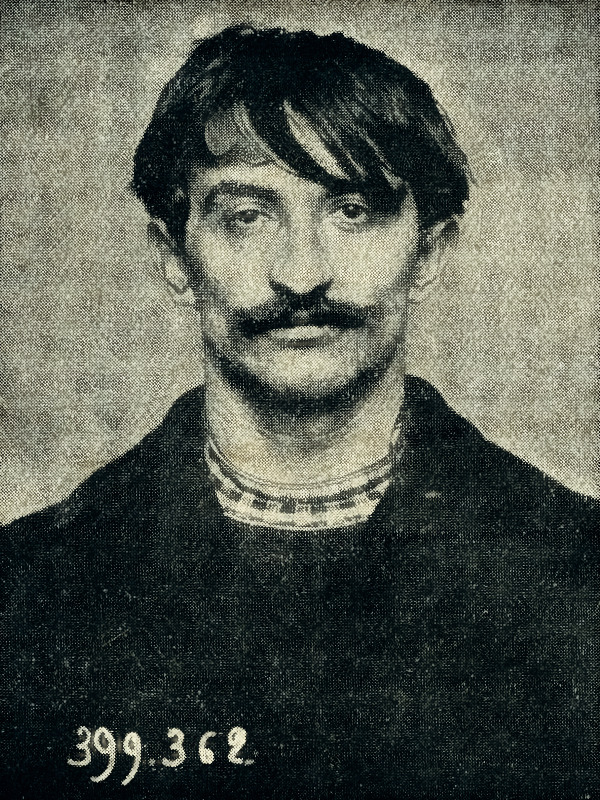
- Lacombe's mugshot in 1911
- Born: 12 April 1885; Aubin, Aveyron, France
- Died: 5 April 1913 (aged 27); La Santé Prison, Paris, France
- Cause of death: Suicide
- Movement: Anarchism

Léon Lacombe (12 April 1885 – 5 April 1913) was a French anarchist, criminal and murderer. After being arrested in March 1913 for the murder of an anarchist newspaper editor, he was incarcerated at La Santé Prison in Paris after confessing to two additional murders, being charged with a total of four counts of murder. The following month, Lacombe committed suicide by diving off the prison roof.

== Life ==
Lacombe was born on 12 April 1885, in Aubin, Aveyron, to Victor Lacombe and Marie-Joséphine Cibié, a coal sorter who raised him as a single mother. Lacombe began working in the coal mines as a 12-year-old and later underwent military service, after which he moved to Decazeville, working at a mine in Cérons. Lacombe began taking interest to anarchism and started participating in anarchist gatherings in the area. Afterwards, Lacombe was fired from the mine in Cérons resulted by accusations of theft. Engineer Albert Artous, the man who fired him, was fatally shot in his home on 12 January 1912. The perpetrator was suspected to be Lacombe, who, due to being an anarchist, struggled to find another job. After moving and finding work in Paris, he began burglarizing and shooting people, including a station dispatcher at Les Aubrais station on 14 September 1912. On 9 November, he reportedly fatally shot a man at a post office in Bezons during a burglary. As he became sought by authorities, Lacombe began suspecting a bookstore seller of being an informant, and shot him at his home during the night of 5 December 1912.

== Arrest ==
Lacombe was sought after by French authorities since December 1911. While on the run, he crossed in and out of the border to Belgium, and continued to evade authorities until being arrested by detectives on 11 March 1913, during a street fair on Boulevard de la Vilette in Paris. He was noticed by detectives for his distinctive heart tattoo on his right hand. While being subdued by authorities, Lacombe made an unsuccessful attempt to reach for his coat pocket. Authorities later found that he had been in possession of dynamite, two revolvers loaded with ammunition, and two fuzes. As Lacombe was escorted to the police station, a mob tried to physically attack him.

Lacombe had been further sought after for a three-month period for the murder of M. Ducret, an anarchist newspaper editor of L'Idee Libre. During interrogations, Lacombe confessed to murdering Ducret. He additionally made confessions for the murder of a Bezons postmaster as well as the murder of a Fleury-les-Aubrais railroad worker. According to Lacombe, he "suspected Ducret ... of trying to betray him." In total, he received four murder charges. While he was incarcerated at La Santé Prison, prison officers took extra steps in monitoring Lacombe. He was expected to be executed by guillotine.

== Suicide ==
On the morning of 5 April 1913, while in the prison courtyard, Lacombe quickly moved to climb a nearby ladder that provided access to the roof, which he was already on by the time officers could get to him. Standing on the edge of the roof, Lacombe made threats of jumping off towards the pursuing officers. Magistrate M. Drioux attempted to convince Lacombe to surrender himself, which he replied, "It is too late. I have finished. I killed Ducret because he was a spy. I was at Bezons and shot the postmaster in self-defence, but I am innocent of any other murder." Lacombe, becoming adamant on his decision to take his own life, rejected negotiations by the warden. He spoke to Georges Boucheron, his lawyer, and began crying as he requested Boucheron to take care of his mother and grandmother. Lacombe continued to speak, "I began to beg when I was seven years old. I tried to work, but fate followed me." His decision to jump from the roof was set for 11:30, saying, "At half-past eleven all will be finished." He then gave a salute, shouting, "It is the moment. Tell my mother that my last thought was of her. Farewell!" Lacombe then committed suicide by diving off the roof.
