= La Santé Prison =

Famous French prison in Paris

La Santé
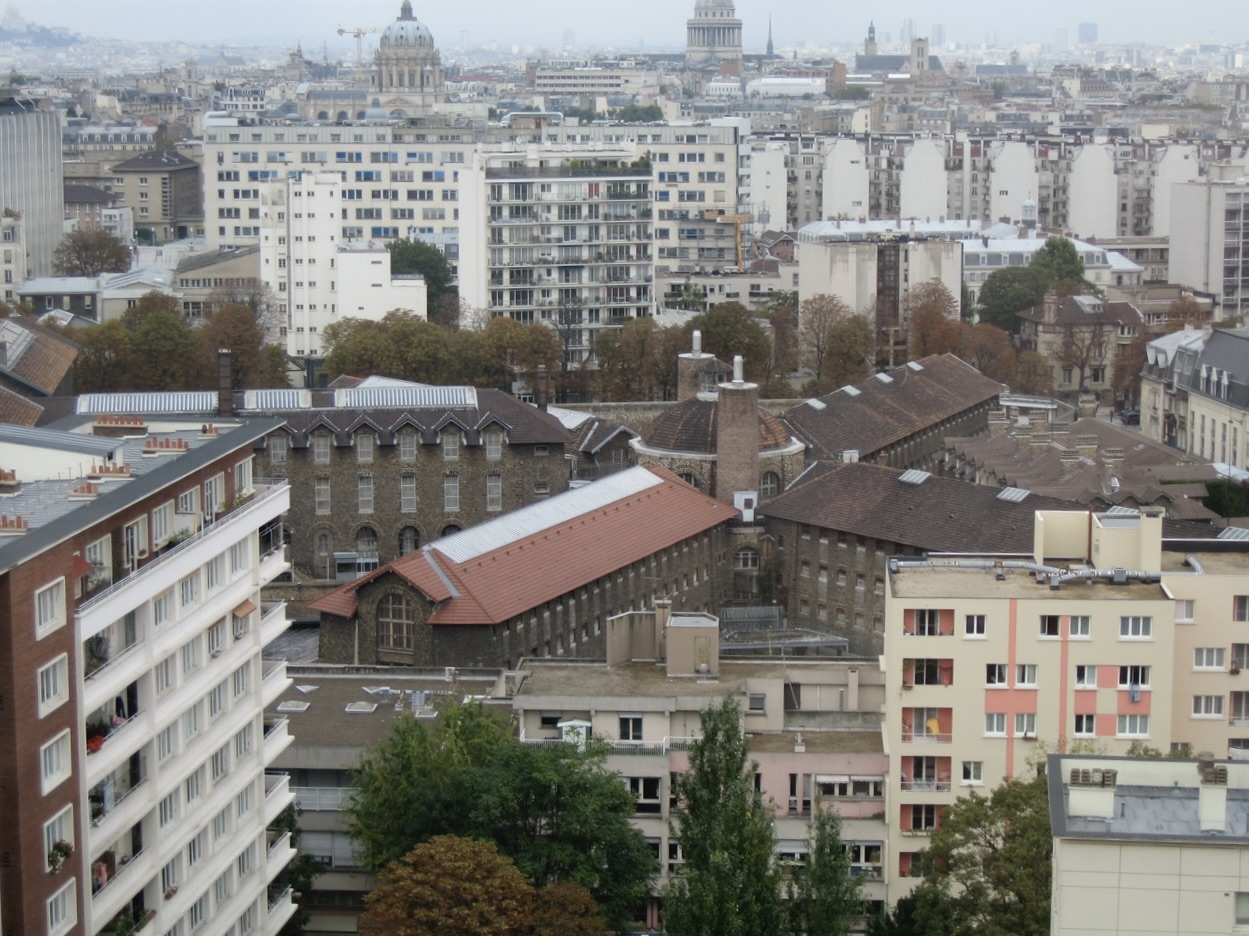
- La Santé Prison (surrounded by high-rise buildings)
- Interactive map of La Santé
- Location: Paris; 48°50′02″N 2°20′23″E
- Status: Operational
- Capacity: 920
- Opened: 1867
- Managed by: French Prison Service; Ministry of Justice

Notable prisoners
- Jacques Mesrine, Manuel Noriega, Félicien Kabuga, Nicolas Sarkozy

La Santé Prison (named after its location on the Rue de la Santé) (French: Maison d'arrêt de la Santé or Prison de la Santé) is a prison operated by the French Prison Service of the Ministry of Justice located in the east of the Montparnasse district of the 14th arrondissement in southern Paris, France, at 42 Rue de la Santé. It is one of the most famous prisons in France, with both VIP and maximum security sections.

La Santé is one of the three main prisons of the Paris area, along with Fleury-Mérogis (Europe's largest prison) and Fresnes, both located in the southern suburbs.

== History ==
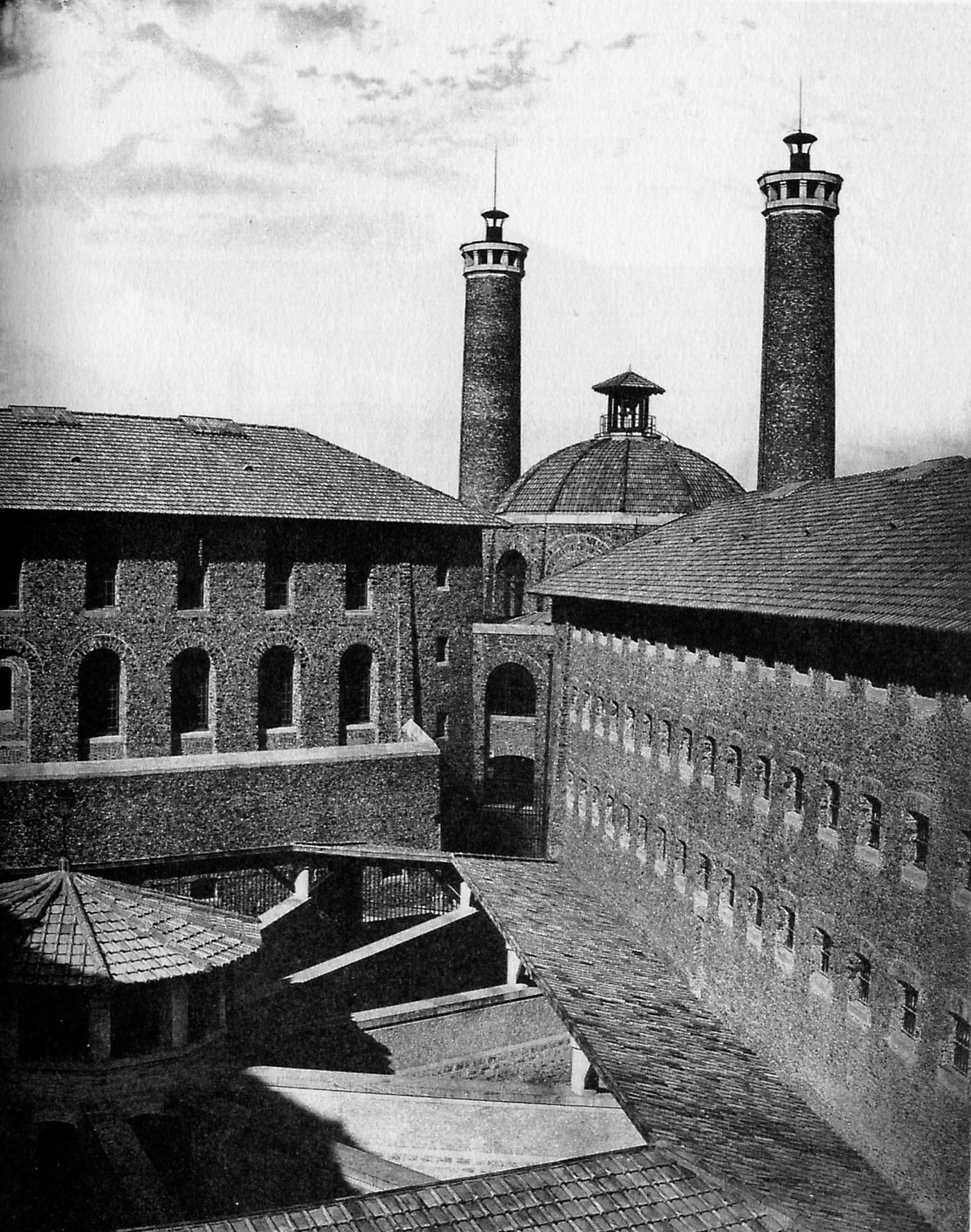
La Santé prison in the 19th century as photographed by Charles Marville

The architect Joseph Auguste Émile Vaudremer built the prison, which was inaugurated on 20 August 1867.

The prison is located on the site of a former coal market and replaced the Madelonnettes Convent in the 3rd Arrondissement, which had been used as a prison since the French Revolution. Previously, on the same site, was a Maison de la santé (House of Health), built on the orders of Anne of Austria and transferred in 1651 to what is now the Sainte-Anne Hospital Center.

In 1899, after the closure and demolition of the prison Grande Roquette, convicts were transferred to La Santé either to await transfer to the Prison of St-Laurent-du-Maroni in French Guiana or to await execution. Initially, there were 500 cells in La Santé, which was increased to 1,000 cells in 1900. The cells are 4 metres long, 2.5m wide and 3m high. The prison has a total capacity of as many as 2,000 prisoners, divided into 14 divisions.

With executions having previously been performed at the entrance to Grande Roquette, it was decided to do something similar at La Santé. The guillotine was erected at the corner of the Rue de la Santé and the Boulevard Arago, on the pavement. The first execution – and the first in Paris for ten years – occurred on 6 August 1909. It was for Georges Duchemin, who had been convicted of parricide.

On 7 May 1932, Eugene Boyer, a 27-year-old criminal who had been denied a presidential pardon the previous day by President Paul Doumer, was to be executed by guillotine. Doumer was assassinated the day the execution was scheduled: in France, the president could reverse his decision until the last moment and obviously Boyer could not benefit from this potential "ultimate mercy", so the execution was cancelled "in extremis" (twenty minutes before the time scheduled). He was finally pardoned by Albert Lebrun on 13 May – which respected the tradition of pardoning those sentenced to death the first time in the presidential office – and he was sent to the Prison of St-Laurent-du-Maroni in Guiana. He was referred to as André Baillard in the book by Henri Charrière.

Nearly forty prisoners ended their lives in this place. It was also at this site that the second-last public execution in France was performed, for burglar and double murderer Max Bloch on 2 June 1939. Fifteen days later on 17 June, Eugen Weidmann, guilty of six murders, was guillotined in front of Versailles prison and on 24 June the decision was made to ban public executions. In the same decision, the death penalty was made dependent on the Court of Appeal of Seine (either Seine-et-Oise or Aube), with prisoners executed inside Prison de la Santé.

On 15 March 1940, the Vocoret brothers, who killed three policemen in Issy-les-Moulineaux, were the first criminals to be guillotined inside the prison.

During the German Occupation of France, in addition to common law criminals, there were also executions of 18 Resistance fighters and communists. Nine of them were guillotined between August 1941 and July 1942. The other nine were shot on 30 April 1944. They are memorialized by a plaque affixed to the wall of the prison at the corner of Rue Jean-Dolent and Rue de la La Santé.

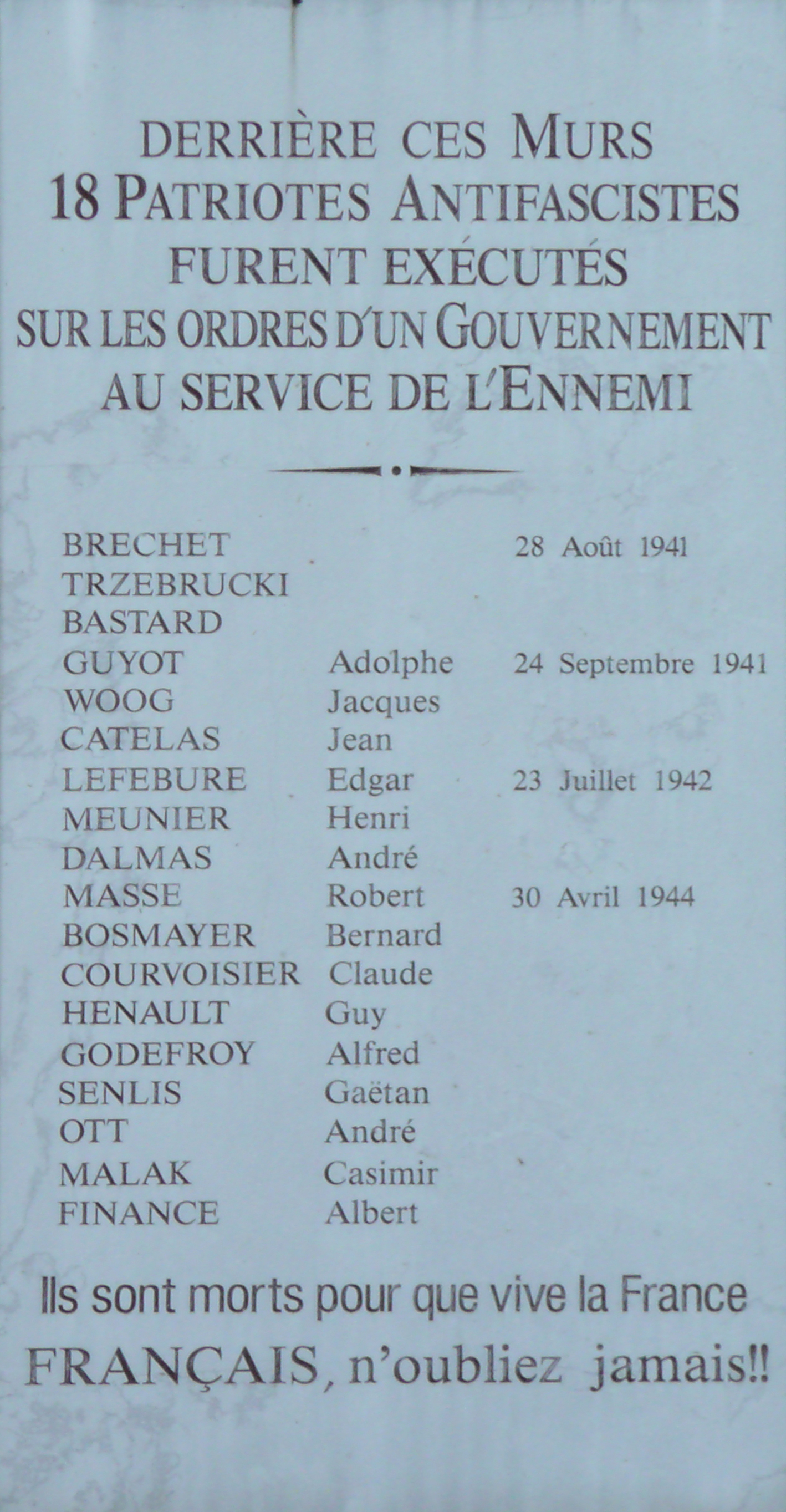
Plaque in memory of the 18 resistance fighters who were executed in the prison

After the Liberation of France, only common criminals were executed in the courtyard of the prison (except for several FLN activists between 1958 and 1960). Those executed included Marcel Petiot in 1946, Marquis Alain de Bernardy de Sigoyer in 1947, Emile Buisson ("Public Enemy No. 1") in 1956, Jacques Fesch in 1957, and Georges Rapin, known as "Mr. Bill", in 1960.

The last death sentences by guillotine at La Santé were those of Roger Bontems and Claude Buffet. They were the authors of an escape attempt with hostage-taking that ended with the death of the hostages in 1971. Sentenced to death at Troyes on 29 June 1972, they were executed on the following 28 November.

According to them, those sentenced to death who were from the Île-de-France region were locked in Fresnes Prison (which from 1978 would become the only prison permitted to host executions) but neither were executed due to the eventual abolition of the death penalty. The last two remaining guillotines in France are now stored in the basement of the National Centre for Guidance in Fresnes prison.

In 2000, the chief doctor of the prison, Véronique Vasseur, published a book in which she denounced the very poor imprisonment conditions. The book was a shock to the public and prompted parliamentary evaluation of the situation. In 2014, the prison closed for renovations, which required 5 years to complete

== Buildings ==
The prison features a hub-and-spoke design similar to that which had been implemented previously for the construction of Eastern State Penitentiary in Philadelphia, Pennsylvania, US. The prison is surrounded by:

- Boulevard Arago to the north.
- Rue Messier to the west.
- Rue Jean-Dolent to the south.
- Rue de la Santé to the east.

One of the peculiarities of la Santé is that, until 2000, inmates were divided by geographic origin and ethnicity within the prison. One group of prisoners (those who are studying in particular) are grouped separately but most of them were arranged in four blocks: Block A: Western Europe Block B: Black Africa Block C: North Africa Block D: rest of the world.

These blocks have undergone substantial renovation since 2000. The prison was partially closed from 2014 until 2019 in order to be rehabilitated; the parole section, however, was kept in operation during this time.

Prison de la Santé is now the last intra-muros prison in Paris. The other large prisons (in all categories) dependent on Paris are Poissy, Fleury-Mérogis, Fresnes, and Melun.

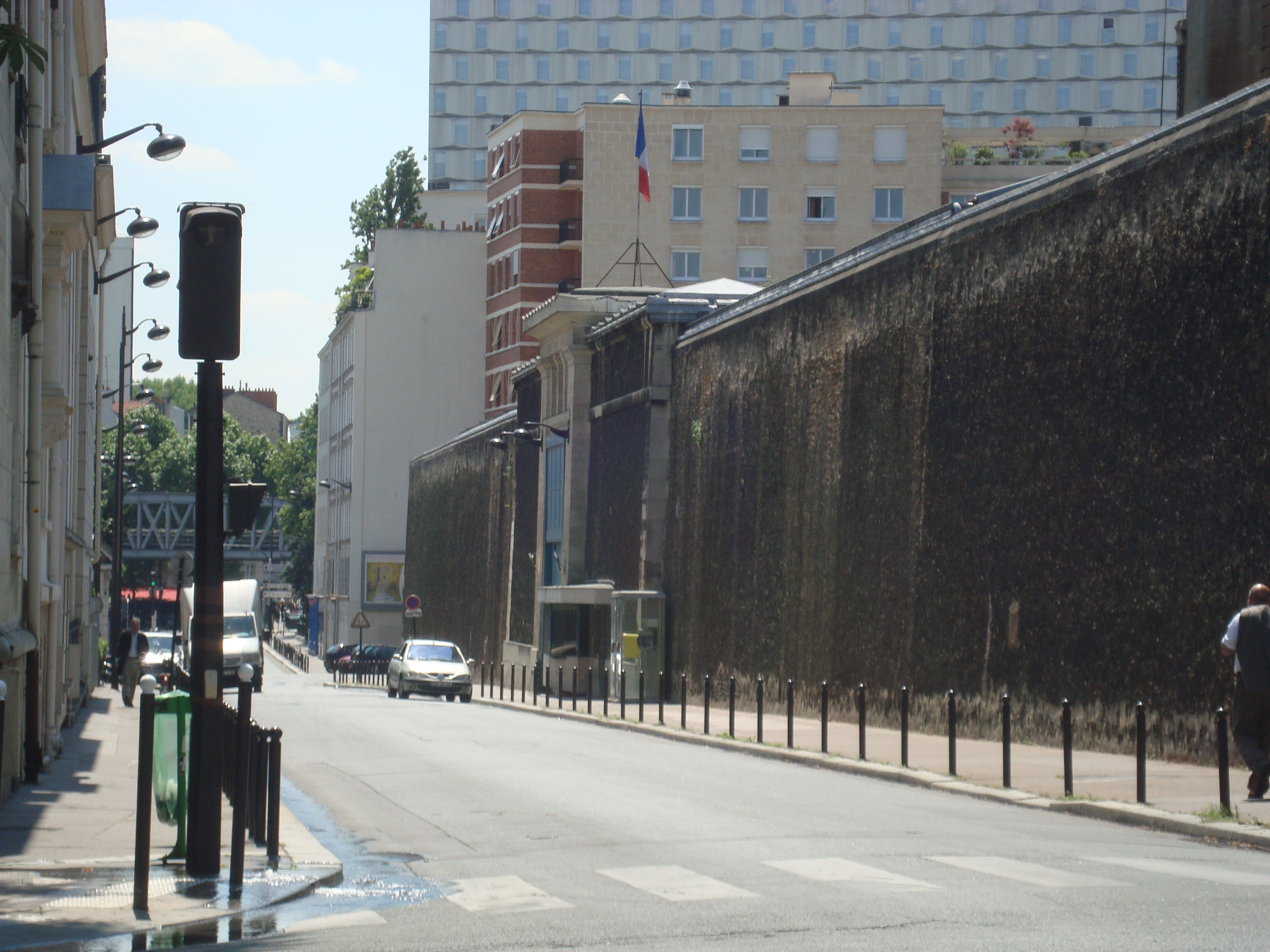
Main entrance of the Prison at 42 rue de la Santé.

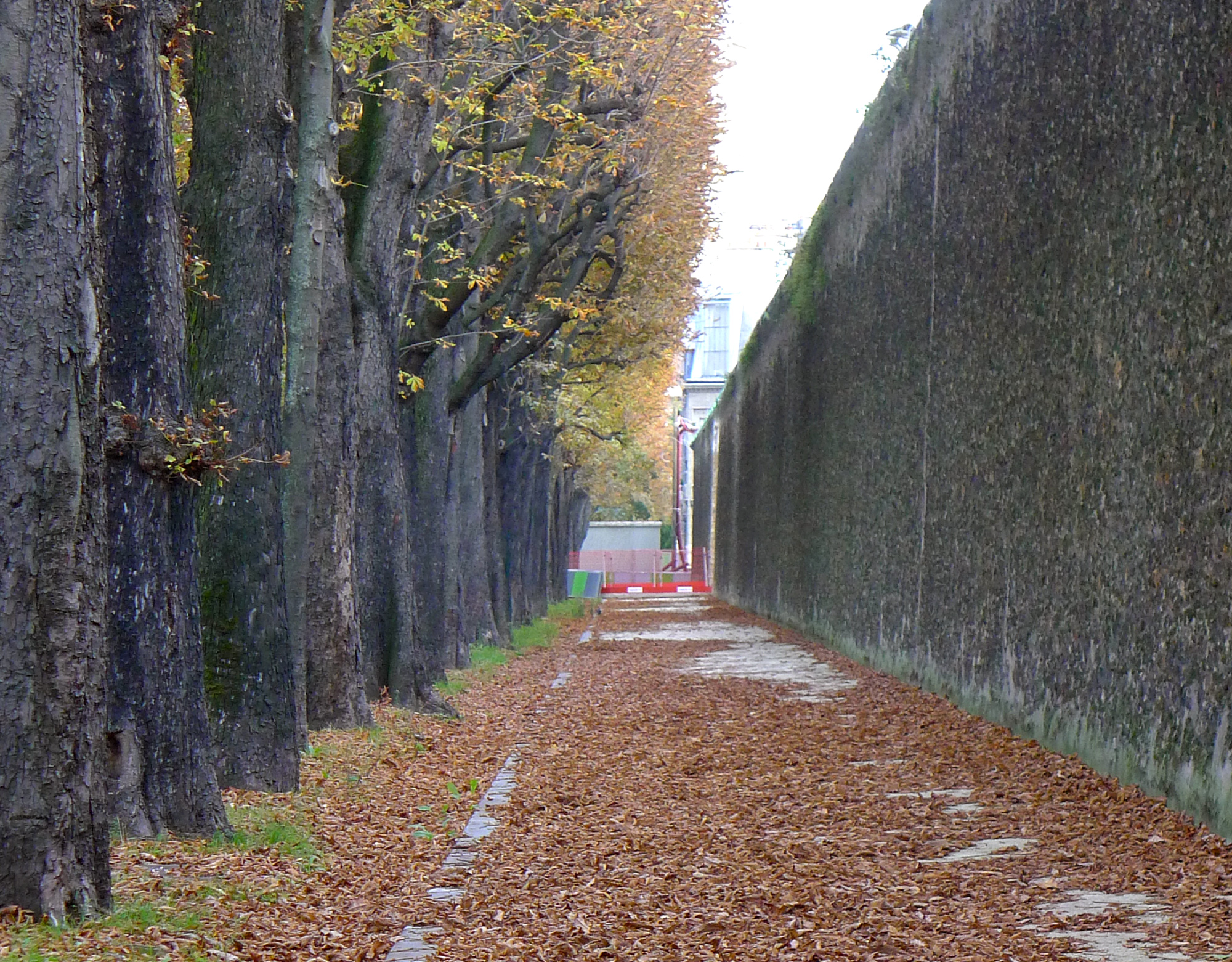
North face of the La Santé Prison, taken from Boulevard Arago.

=== The "VIP" Section ===
The imprisonment of convicted "personalities" is one of the features of La Santé Prison. The area where these well-known people are imprisoned is termed the "special area" by the administration. The visiting rooms for these prisoners are at 1 rue Messier as for other prisoners (where there is nearby accommodation for visiting relatives).

The movie Quartier V.I.P. is set partly there.

=== Notable prisoners ===
- Hocine Aït Ahmed – Algerian Politician (and one of the nine "historic leaders" of the FLN)
- Guillaume Apollinaire
- Patrick Balkany
- Lieutenant-colonel Jean-Marie Bastien-Thiry – attack of Petit-Clamart against President de Gaulle in 1962
- Ahmed Ben Bella – Algerian Politician (and one of the nine "historic leaders" of the FLN and former President of Algeria)
- Bernard Bonnet
- Mohamed Boudiaf – Algerian Politician (and one of the nine "historic leaders" of the FLN and former President of Algeria)
- Clairvaux mutineers
- Yvan Colonna – for the assassination of Claude Érignac
- Maurice Challe – attempted coup against the France of Charles de Gaulle, Algiers putsch of 1961
- Léon Daudet
- Mourad Dhina – Algerian Politician, imprisoned from 16 January to 4 July 2012.
- Alén Diviš
- Antonio Ferrara – armoured car robbery, escape
- Jacques Fesch
- Jean Genet
- Paul Gorguloff – killer of Paul Doumer (President of France)
- Willem Holleeder – infamous Dutch criminal
- Cor van Hout
- Félicien Kabuga – Financier of the 1994 Rwandan genocide
- Jérôme Kerviel
- Léon Lacombe – burglar and murderer who was part of the anarchist movement
- Pierre Lagaillarde
- Younes Latifi better known as Mister You or Yougataga
- Francesc Macià – President of Catalonia (Spain)
- Cheb Mami
- Jacques Mesrine – robbery, murder, escape, illegal confinement of a judge, abduction of a Canadian millionaire
- Ernesto Milá
- Jean-Christophe Mitterrand
- Didier Morville better known under the name Joey Starr, a rapper from Suprême NTM
- Samy Naceri
- Michel Neyret – remanded from 3 October 2011 to 23 May 2012 in the matter of the case of corruption in the French police in 2011
- Xavier Niel – one month on remand with a warrant of committal for "the misuse of corporate assets" in 2004 (in the "VIP area" in the former cell of Alfred Sirven)
- Manuel Noriega – deposed military dictator of Panama
- Maurice Papon
- Pascal Payet – armored car robbery, murder of a cash-escort, escape
- Gabriel Péri
- Marcel Petiot
- Christophe Rocancourt in December 2011
- Issei Sagawa
- Nicolas Salvadori better known as Seth Gueko
- Ilich Ramírez Sánchez, called Carlos (The Jackal)
- Nicolas Sarkozy, former French President
- Victor Serge
- Claude Sigala – main protagonist in the Coral Case
- Alfred Sirven
- Albert Spaggiari
- Bruno Sulak (called the "Arsène Lupin of the 80s": 1955–1985; died from wounds after an attempted escape)
- Bernard Tapie
- Phan Chau Trinh (Vietnam Sep 1914–July 1915)
- Lucio Urtubia – Spanish anarchist
- Élie Yaffa better known as Booba
- Jean-Luc Brunel, the former head of a French model agency who was accused of supplying young girls to disgraced financier Jeffrey Epstein, was found hanged in his cell 2/19/2022.

=== Escapes ===
- 1927: Léon Daudet escaped 13 days after his imprisonment with Joseph Delest with a false order of release given to the prison director.
- 8 May 1978: Jacques Mesrine, François Besse, and Carman Rives (who was killed during the escape).
- May 1986: Helicopter escape of Michel Vaujour, piloted by his wife, Nadine Vaujour.

These are the only known escapes from this prison.

== Around the prison ==
=== À la bonne Santé ===
In front of the exit of the prison there was a cafe called À la bonne Santé (In good health). Relatives of the prisoners would meet there with released prisoners. Scenes from several films took place and were filmed there. The cafe closed in 1980. Currently the premises are used by the prison administration.

=== La Santé in popular culture ===
- Arsène Lupin, a fictional character by Maurice Leblanc, was taken prisoner at La Santé prison at the end of his debut, the short story "The Arrest of Arsène Lupin," and in the novel 813 (1910).
- La Santé Prison was the supposed scene of the movie Le Trou (The Hole) (1960), directed by Jacques Becker. During preparations for the escape of prisoners through the sewers the street names can be seen on signs in the sewers and there is an exterior view of the prison at the corner of the Boulevard Arago and Rue de la Santé.
- In the song "L'argent ne fait pas le bonheur" (Money does not buy happiness) (1966) from the group Les Parisiennes: "Take all your [clothes] gaily under your arm and leave without paying / We will bring you oranges at La Santé".
- Georges Brassens evokes La Santé Prison in his song La femme d'Hector (Hector's wife): "When one takes us by hand / god darned good in a bag / And one sends us to plant / Cabbages at La Santé" as well as his song Le mauvais sujet repenti (The evil-doer repents): "After a century, was thrown / At the door of La Santé".
- Yves Duteil evokes empathy of a passer-by for the prisoners of La Santé in his song Le mur de la prison d'en face (The prison wall opposite).
- For the episode Broken Wing of U.S. television drama 'Leverage', Parker served an unknown amount of time in La Sante. Afterwards, she declared that the best meal she ever ate was in that prison and that she didn't serve as long as they thought she would there.
- The novel "A Cold Death" by Michael Mandaville uses La Santé Prison to show the attempted assassination of Maurice Papon.
- In Georges Simenon's Maigret series novel "A Man's Head", La Sante Prison features greatly in the first chapter.
- In Sakura Wars 3: Is Paris Burning?, Lobelia Carlini was detained in La Santé for a 1,000-year-long sentence.
- La Sante is the subject of a 2016 episode in the Arte TV Series Architectures. In this episode, the design and aesthetic values of the building are studied.
- In the videogame Cyberpunk 2077, antagonist Kurt Hansen mentions that he has friends in La Santé, during the mission "Firestarter".
