= Neyret (disambiguation) =

Neyret is a red Italian wine grape variety. Neyret may also refer to:

- Aurélie Neyret (born 1983), French illustrator and cartoonist of bande dessinée
- Bob Neyret (born 1934), French dental surgeon and semi-professional rally driver
- Michel Neyret (born 1956), former French police chief of staff in Lyon
