= Jacques Fesch =

French murderer and Servant of God

Servant of God Jacques Fesch
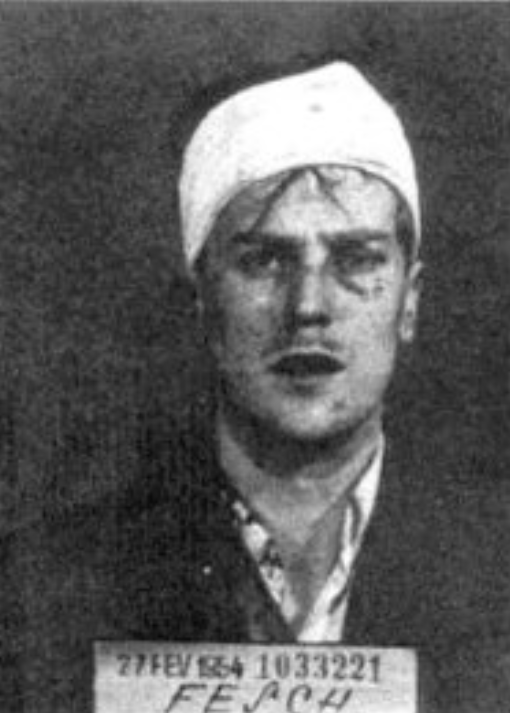
- Born: 6 April 1930; Saint-Germain-en-Laye, Seine-et-Oise, France
- Died: 1 October 1957 (aged 27); La Santé Prison, Paris, France
- Cause of death: Execution by guillotine

Jacques Fesch (6 April 1930 – 1 October 1957) was a French criminal who was convicted of the murder of police officer Jean Vergne in February 1954. While awaiting execution in prison, Fesch became such a devout Catholic that he has since been proposed as a candidate for sainthood.

== Early life ==
Fesch was born in Saint-Germain-en-Laye to Georges Fesch and Athalie "Marthe" Hallez. Georges, who claimed to be a part of the Fesch noble family, was a wealthy banker of Belgian origin, who came to France in the 1920s. Georges was an artist and atheist who was distant from his son. Jacques grew up with two older sisters and was doted on by his mother, a pious Catholic.

From 1938 to 1947, he attended Saint-Érembert School and Claude-Debussy High School, both Catholic schools. Jacques was raised Catholic, but abandoned religion by the age of 17, after his parents divorced. He was expelled the same year from high school for laziness and misconduct. Without a baccalauréat, Fesch began frequenting jazz clubs in Saint-Germain-des-Prés in Paris, where he developed a reputation as a womaniser. He completed military duty between 1950 and 1951 in West Germany, earning the rank of corporal and a good conduct certificate. Fesch's army record listed him as a poor marksman.

On 5 June 1951, Fesch married his pregnant girlfriend, Pierrette Polack, a former classmate of his, in a civil ceremony in Strasbourg. Although Polack and her parents were Catholic, Fesch's antisemitic parents disapproved of the marriage because Polack's father was ethnically Jewish. The couple thus lived with Polack's parents, and Fesch was given a job at the coal delivery business of his wife's father. Fesch illegally pocketed funds in this position and spent them on frivolous purchases to impress women he dated in extramarital affairs. Around the same time, Fesch's mother reached out to him and offered her son 1 million francs to fund a coal company to rival the Polacks, stating that she wanted Fesch to "quickly get away from the grubby paws of those dirty Jews" ("tirer au plus vite des pattes de ces sales juifs "). Fesch took the money, spent a portion on a Simca convertible and wasted the rest on his playboy lifestyle. In 1952, Fesch's deception was eventually discovered by his in-laws, who threw him out, with his wife and infant daughter Véronique staying in their home. He then reconciled with his parents and took a job at his father's bank.

In December 1953, Fesch met Thérèse Troniou, and by her fathered an illegitimate son, Gérard, who was put into the foster system. After being dismissed from the bank job, Fesch developed an interest in sailing after reading the books Seul à travers l'Atlantique and À la poursuite du soleil by Alain Gerbault. Disillusioned with his life, Fesch dreamed of escaping to sail around the South Pacific Ocean, but his parents refused to pay for a boat. He nonetheless issued the construction of a sail boat in La Rochelle.

== Crime ==
To fund the payment for the boat, Fesch decided to rob the Comptoir de Change et de Numismatique money changer office, operated by Alexandre Silberstein, in the 2nd arrondissment of Paris. To this end, Fesch placed an order for two gold ingots, one 100 napoléon coin, forty-four 20 napoléon coins and twenty 50 peseta coins, totalling a worth of 2 million franc, stole a revolver from his father and convinced his best friend Jacques "Criquet" Robbe to accompany him to the money changer, not informing Robbe of his plans.

At around 5 p.m. on 24 February 1954, Fesch and Robbe went to Silberstein's business on rue Saint-Marc, where Fesch pulled his revolver from a large bag. Realising that Fesch was robbing the place, Robbe immediately left the premises and called for help outside, shouting "Quick, my best friend is doing something stupid" ("Vite, mon meilleur ami est en train de faire une bêtise"). Fesch locked the door and began demanding the gold from the elderly shopkeeper. Silberstein asked Fesch to reconsider, stating that he was a veteran and that Fesch was going to ruin his own life with the robbery. Fesch then pistol-whipped Silberstein twice, knocking him to the ground, but not rendering him unconscious. Silberstein was able to raise the alarm, startling Fesch, who dropped his gun and, while picking it back up, accidentally shot himself in the left hand. Fesch grabbed 300,000 franc from the cash register and fled the scene.

Fesch was chased by several passersby, but lost them by hiding on the fifth floor of an apartment building on 9 Boulevard des Italiens. During his escape, Fesch had lost his glasses. The concierge had spotted Fesch entering and flagged down 35-year-old police officer Jean-Baptiste Vergne to tell him of his find. A crowd had gathered in the building's lobby, and having noticed the commotion, Fesch attempted to sneak past. A passerby alerted the others of Fesch's presence, causing Officer Vergne to draw his gun and order Fesch's surrender. Fesch fired his revolver without aiming while the weapon was still in his coat. Vergne was struck in the heart and killed instantly. During his flight, Fesch also injured passerby Raymond Lenoir in the neck when he tried to intervene. After firing another two shots at his pursuers, Fesch ran into Richelieu-Drouot metro station, which had its gates closed. Finally, 28-year-old Georges Plissier overpowered Fesch and disarmed him.

=== Arrest and trial ===
Fesch was brought to the nearby police station, where Jacques Robbe was also being held as a suspect. Chief criminal investigator Max Fernet personally handled his interrogation at 36, quai des Orfèvres. Fesch admitted to the robbery and the killing of Jean Vergne, expressing no remorse and only voicing his regret that he was caught. The officers slapped and severely beat Fesch several times during the interrogation. Fesch eventually also gave his motive for the robbery, saying that he was planning to purchase a boat to go to Tahiti. By the end of questioning, detective Fernet concluded that Fesch had planned the robbery alone, tricked Robbe, intending to make him an accomplice and acted with willingness to kill, as the revolver found on Fesch had its safety catch removed.

Murdering a police officer was a heinous crime, and public opinion, inflamed by newspaper reports, was strongly in favour of his execution. The Cour d'assises of Paris condemned him to death on 6 April 1957 after a three-day trial. The same court tried Jacques Robbe and Jean Blot, who allegedly planned the robbery with Fesch, and found them not guilty. Robbe claimed that the death sentence for Fesch was the result of pressure by several police unions on the ministry of justice, alleging that the unions would have refused to provide security detail for an upcoming visit of Queen Elizabeth II on 8 April.

== Religious conversion ==
Early into his imprisonment, Fesch was indifferent to his plight and mocked the Catholic faith of his lawyer Paul Baudet, whom he nicknamed: "the panther of God". However, after a year in prison, he experienced a profound religious conversion, became very pious, and bitterly regretted his crime. He corresponded regularly with a Catholic monk from his hometown, Brother Thomas, and his family, notably his mother and mother-in-law, who sent him material related to the Three Secrets of Fátima and kept a spiritual journal. Fesch once offered to apologise to Jean Vergne's wife and beg for forgiveness, not knowing that Vergne was a widower and that his now-four-year-old daughter was not willing to talk with him. On 1 March 1955, Fesch declared himself a mystic after experiencing a vision. He accepted his punishment serenely and was reconciled to his wife the night before his execution. His last journal entry was "In five hours, I will see Jesus, how good he is, our Lord.". His final words spoken on the guillotine are quoted as either "The crucifix, Father, the crucifix" or "Holy Virgin, have pity on me!". An appeal for clemency to President René Coty failed, and he was executed on 1 October 1957.

== Legacy ==
After his death, his wife and daughter honoured his memory as an example of redemption. At first, he was excoriated by the public, but with the work of Sister Véronique, a Carmelite nun, and Lawyer Augustin-Michel Lemonnier, the family effected publication of his writings, and from the 1970s these served as an inspiration to many.

On 21 September 1987, the Archbishop of Paris, Cardinal Jean-Marie Lustiger, opened a diocesan inquiry into his life; the cause for his beatification was formally opened in 1993. This has proved controversial, with those who feel his early crimes make him unfitting as a role model opposed to those who emphasize the hope of his final conversion.

His writings have often been quoted in Catholic publications. His personal journal and letters to his mother and Brother Thomas are often about mystical or theological matters.

== Theatrical plays about Fesch ==
Fesch's conversion is often cited in Christian writings about forgiveness of the sinner. Inspired by the true events of this "murderer turned Christian," the students of Ss Cyril and Methodius High School in Nitra, Slovakia, under the direction of Maria Marthe Galová, wrote and performed a theatrical play, "Spomeň si na mňa" (Remember Me), which is based on the life and conversion of Jacques. The play premiered on 11 March 2018, in the Andrej Bagar Theatre, Nitra.

== Books about Fesch ==
- (In Spanish): El reflejo de lo oscuro. By Javier Sicilia, FCE, Mexico, 1997, ISBN 978-968-16-5112-1
- (In French) Gilbert Collard «Assasaint : Jacques Fesch, l'histoire du bon larron moderne » (Editions Presses de la Renaissance)

== Bibliography ==
- Translation: Allen, Rupert (2025). I Wait in the Night: The Death Row Journal of Jacques Fesch. Our Sunday Visitor. ISBN 978-1639663255.
- Translation: Light over the Scaffold and Cell 18: The Prison Letters of Jacques Fesch. Alba House, 1996.
- Fesch, Jacques; preface Père Daniel-Ange (1998). Dans 5 heures je verrai Jésus!: Journal de prison (in French) (3rd ed.). Fayard - Le Sarment. ISBN 978-2-86679-168-1.

== Association ==
- Association "Les Amis de Jacques Fesch". Website in French: https://web.archive.org/web/20130113034221/http://amisdejacquesfesch.fr/

== General references ==
- "A Saint who killed:Jacques Fesch was executed for murder in 1957. Now the Church is considering his beatification". by Fr. Oliviero Bruno, Catholic Chaplain in Poggioreale Jail in Naples
