= Hôtel de Ville, Bezons =

Town hall in Bezons, France

Hôtel de Ville
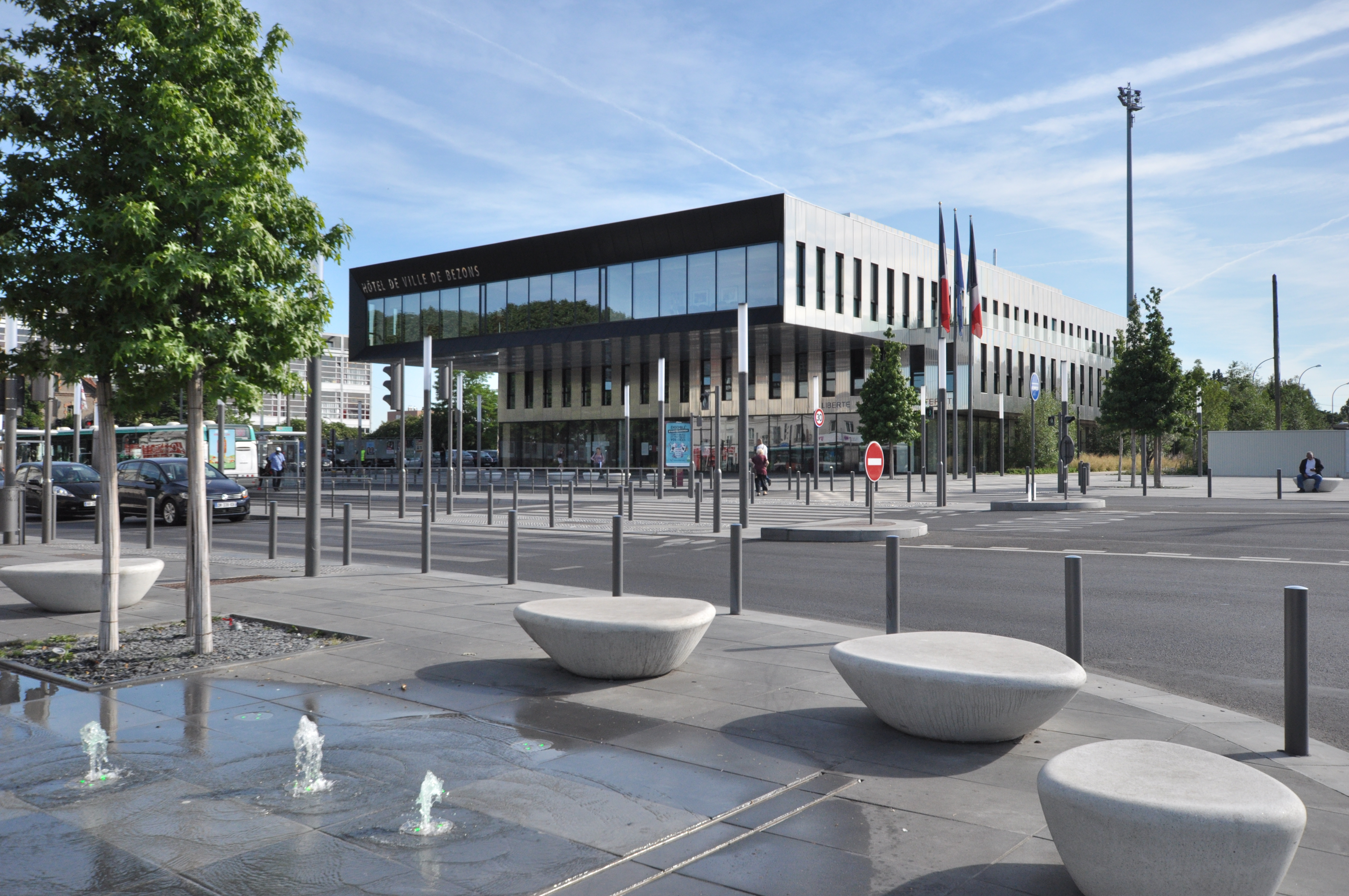
- The main frontage of the Hôtel de Ville in May 2017
- Interactive map of the Hôtel de Ville area

General information
- Type: City hall
- Architectural style: Modern style
- Location: Bezons, France
- Coordinates: 48.9278°N 2.2160°E
- Completed: 2015

Design and construction
- Architect: Emmanuel Combarel Dominique Marrec Architectes (ECDM)

The Hôtel de Ville (French pronunciation: [otɛl də vil], City Hall) is a municipal building in Bezons, Val-d'Oise, in the northwestern suburbs of Paris, standing on Avenue Gabriel Péri.

== History ==
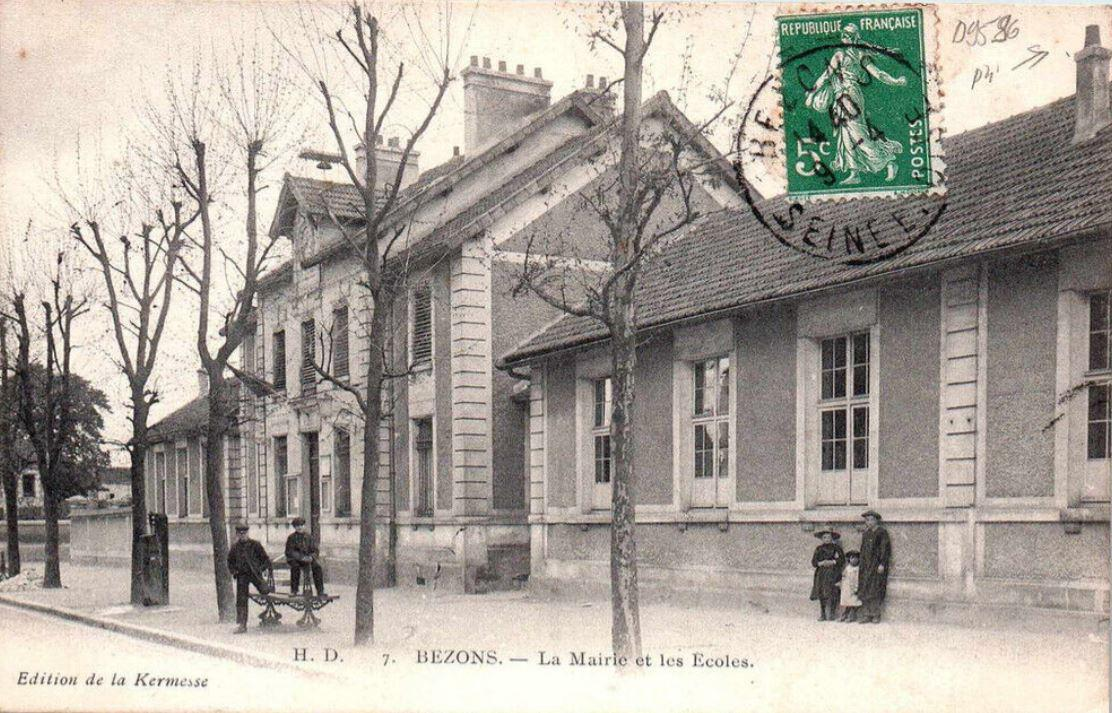
The old town hall in the early 20th century

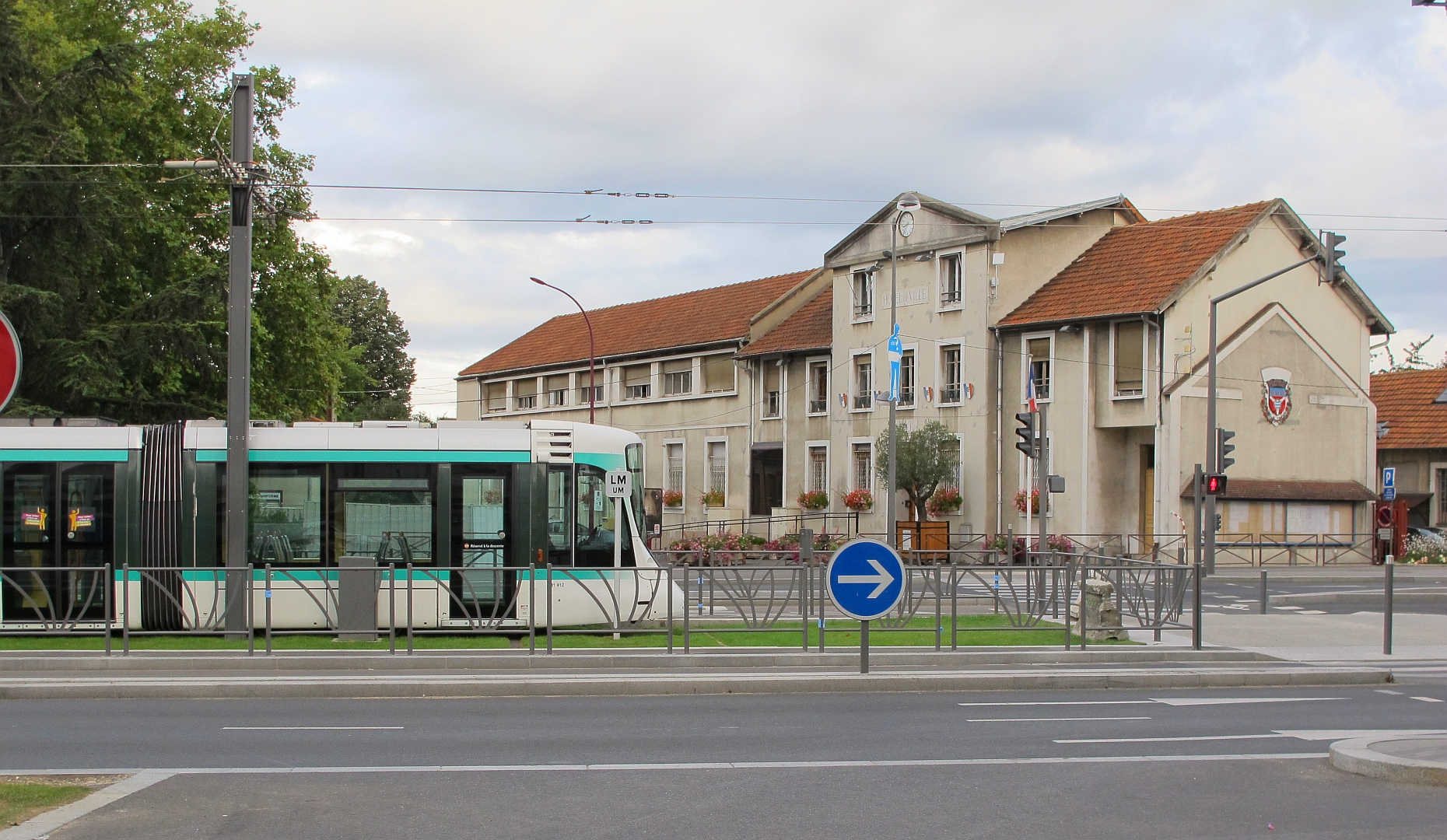
The old town hall in the 1970s

Following the French Revolution, the town council initially met in the house of the mayor at the time. This arrangement continued until the early 1880s, when the council commissioned a combined school and town hall on Place de la Libération. The building was designed in the neoclassical style, built in brick with a cement render finish and was completed in 1882.

The design involved a symmetrical main frontage of five bays facing onto the street. The central section of three bays, which was slightly projected forward, featured a square headed doorway on the ground floor and a casement window on the first floor, all surmounted by a clock with a gable above. The other bays were fenestrated by casement windows. After the First World War a plaque was installed in the entrance to the town hall to commemorate the lives of local people who had died in the war. At the foot of the memorial was the inscription "Guerre à la guerre et haine à la haine" ("War on war and hatred on hatred").

After significant population growth in the mid-20th century, the height of the building was increased with an additional floor and a pediment added to the central section. A plaque with the coat of arms of the town was added to the side wall around the same time.

In the early 21st century, with municipal services spread out across various buildings in the town, the council led by the mayor, Dominique Lesparre, decided to demolish the old town hall and to erect a more substantial building on Avenue Gabriel Péri where all 150 staff could be co-located. The new building was designed by Emmanuel Combarel Dominique Marrec Architectes (ECDM) in the modern style, built in concrete and glass at a cost of €16 million and was officially opened by the mayor on 31 October 2015.

The design involved an asymmetrical main frontage facing onto Avenue Gabriel Péri. The ground floor incorporated a series of plate glass doorways, while the first floor, which was slightly projected out to the south, was fenestrated by 20 casement windows and clad in reflective metal. The second floor featured a box which was fenestrated by a row of 17 plate glass windows and was cantilevered out over the pavement to provide shelter for visitors. Internally, the building featured a patio garden which was overlooked by a sharply-angled staircase.
