= Michel Neyret =

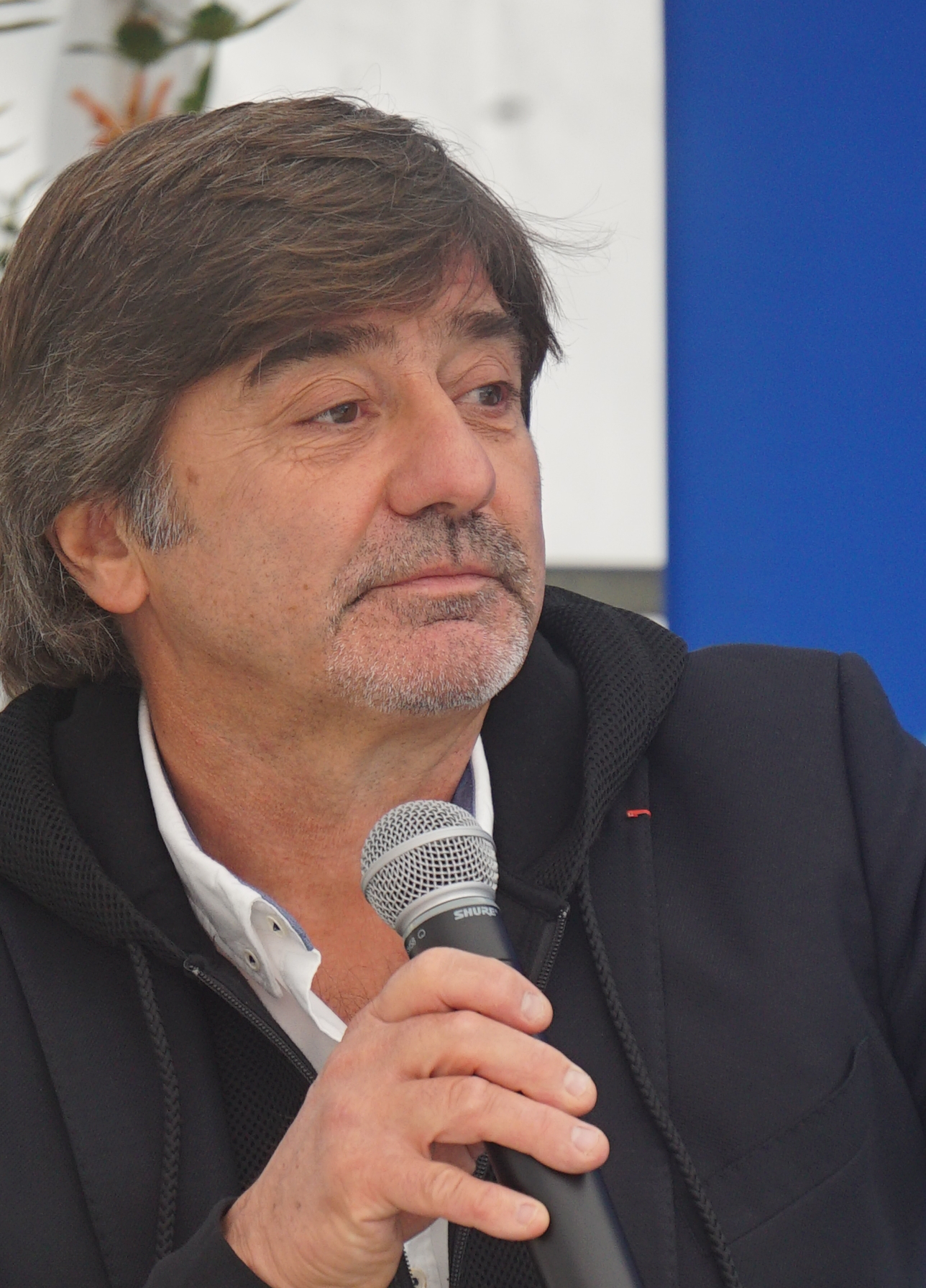
- Born: 12 April 1956 (age 70); Landres, Meurthe-et-Moselle, France
- Occupations: Commissaire de police Police chief assistant

Michel Neyret (born 12 April 1956) is a former police chief of staff (2nd in command) of the Direction interrégionale de la police judiciaire de Lyon (the Lyon Central Detective Branch). He held this role up to his indictment in 2011 for various offences.

== Life and career ==
=== Early life and education ===
Michel Neyret was born and raised in Landres in the department of Meurthe-et-Moselle, the son of a miner. He studied at the law department of the University of Lorraine in Nancy, where he graduated with a master's degree in 1978. Soon after, he passed the recruitment competition to become commissaire de police. (Police Commissioner)

=== Career as police officer ===
He began his career at the Regional Service of the Judicial Police of Versailles where he stayed for two years before becoming the police chief of the judicial service at the police station of Meaux. Commissaire from 1983 to 2004 at the Research and Intervention Brigade (BRI) of Lyon, he left the city in November 2004 to become the police chief of the judicial service at the police station of Nice and obtaining a promotion, becoming commissaire divisionnaire. He returned to Lyon in 2007, where he was chief of staff of the interregional director of judicial police.

Having become a personality in the French National Police, he was honoured Chevalier (Knight) of the Legion of Honour in 2004 for his outstanding work, especially for having participated at the arrest of a network of fanatic Muslims in the outskirts of Lyon in 1995 and having captured those who escaped the prison of Lyunes.

During his years of service, Michel Neyret has obtained a certain popularity in the French media and has also featured in the television program Zone Interdite on M6 in September 2011. He has also inspired the film director Olivier Marchal for his film A Gang Story (2011) and his television film Borderline (2015).

=== Indictment and conviction for corruption ===
His name was spread in public when he was questioned and placed in custody on 29 September 2011 by the General Inspectorate of National Police (the 'police of the police'), being suspected of corruption in an illegal drug trade affair. On 3 October 2011, after his custody, he was indicted for corruption, influence peddling, conspiracy, illegal drug trade, embezzlement and violation of professional confidentiality, and was imprisoned at the famous La Santé Prison. After an appeal judgement in his favour, Michel Neyret was liberated on 23 May 2012. He was placed under house arrest in the town of Toul in Meurthe-et-Moselle, and his driving licence is suspended.

On 16 February 2012, on the television program Complément d'enquête broadcast on France 2, his wife Nicole Neyret confirmed that she attempted to join the Israeli mafia. He was relieved of his functions on 7 September 2012 by Manuel Valls, the then prime minister

In May 2016, the prosecutor requested that Michel Neyret be sentenced to 4 years' imprisonment, with a suspended sentence of 18 months. On 5 July 2016, the Correctional court of Paris sentenced him to two and a half years of prison. His wife Nicole Neyret was sentenced to 8 months of prison for having taken advantage of the "friends" of her husband.

== Honours ==
- Chevalier of the Légion d'honneur in 2004

== Bibliography ==
- Richard Schittly (2016). Éditions Tallandier (ed.). Commissaire Neyret. Chute d'une star de l'antigang (in French). Editions Tallandier. p. 336. ISBN 9791021018457.
- Michel Neyret (2016). Plon (ed.). Flic (in French). p. 288. ISBN 9782259221443.
