= Landres =

- Commune
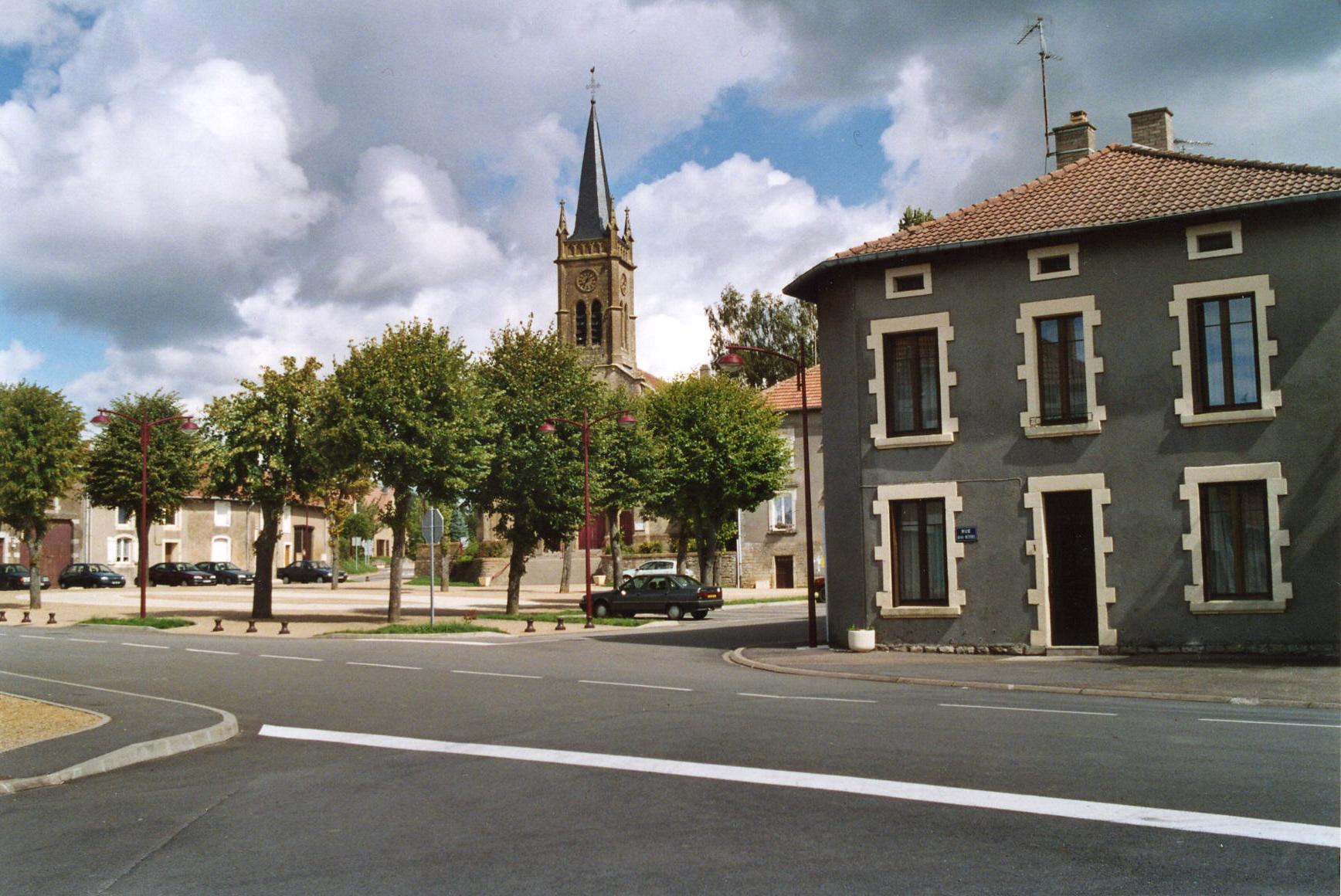
- Place de l'Église.

- Coat of arms
- Location of Landres
- Location within France Location within Grand Est
- Coordinates: 49°19′20″N 5°48′21″E
- Country: France
- Region: Grand Est
- Department: Meurthe-et-Moselle
- Arrondissement: Val-de-Briey
- Canton: Pays de Briey
- Intercommunality: CC Cœur du Pays-Haut

Government
  - Mayor (2020–2026): Marc Ceccato
- Area^{1}: 8.04 km^{2} (3.10 sq mi)
- Elevation: 305 m (1,001 ft)
- Highest elevation: 346 m (1,135 ft)
- Lowest elevation: 280 m (920 ft)
- Population (2023): 989
  - Density: 123/km^{2} (319/sq mi)
- Time zone: UTC+01:00 (CET)
  - Summer (DST): UTC+02:00 (CEST)
- INSEE/Postal code: 54295 /54970
- ^{1} French Land Register data, which excludes lakes, ponds, glaciers > 1 km^{2} (0.386 sq mi or 247 acres) and river estuaries.

Landres (French pronunciation: [lɑ̃dʁ]) is a commune in the Meurthe-et-Moselle department in north-eastern France.

This region of Europe has been occupied by humans since prehistoric times. Archaeological finds in the local area date back to the Mesolithic era. The present settlement and its name date back to at least the medieval period. Historically, there was a chateau, and a noble family, associated with Landres. While it was not in the part of the Lorraine annexed by Germany after the Franco-Prussian War, from 1871 to 1918 the location of the village was fairly close to the border with the German Empire. The community was occupied by Germany during the First World War, and was within the German (Northern) zone of military occupation during the Second World War. According to French census data, Landres' population peaked in the decade of the 1900s, and began a decline in the early 1910s, which was sharply accelerated by the events of World War I; during which the village was damaged by shelling & abandoned by many or most of its French inhabitants. After that war, population numbers recovered somewhat; but even during the post World War II population boom, the numbers never returned to their levels from first decade of the Twentieth Century.

A ruined street in Landres, 1916; postcard drawing by a German soldier. As can be seen in the lede photograph, the church appears to be the only surviving structure from this scene.

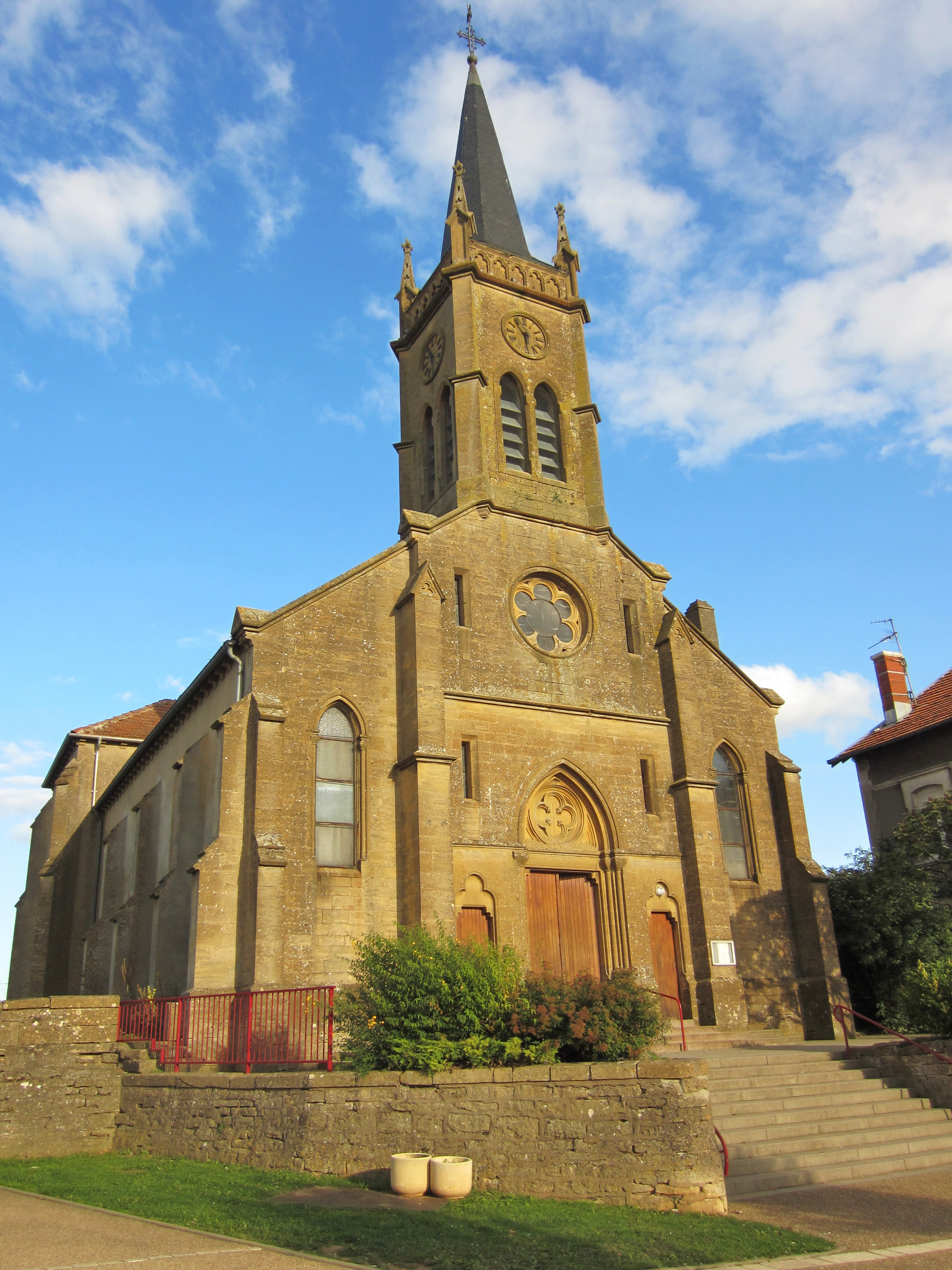
Another view of the village church

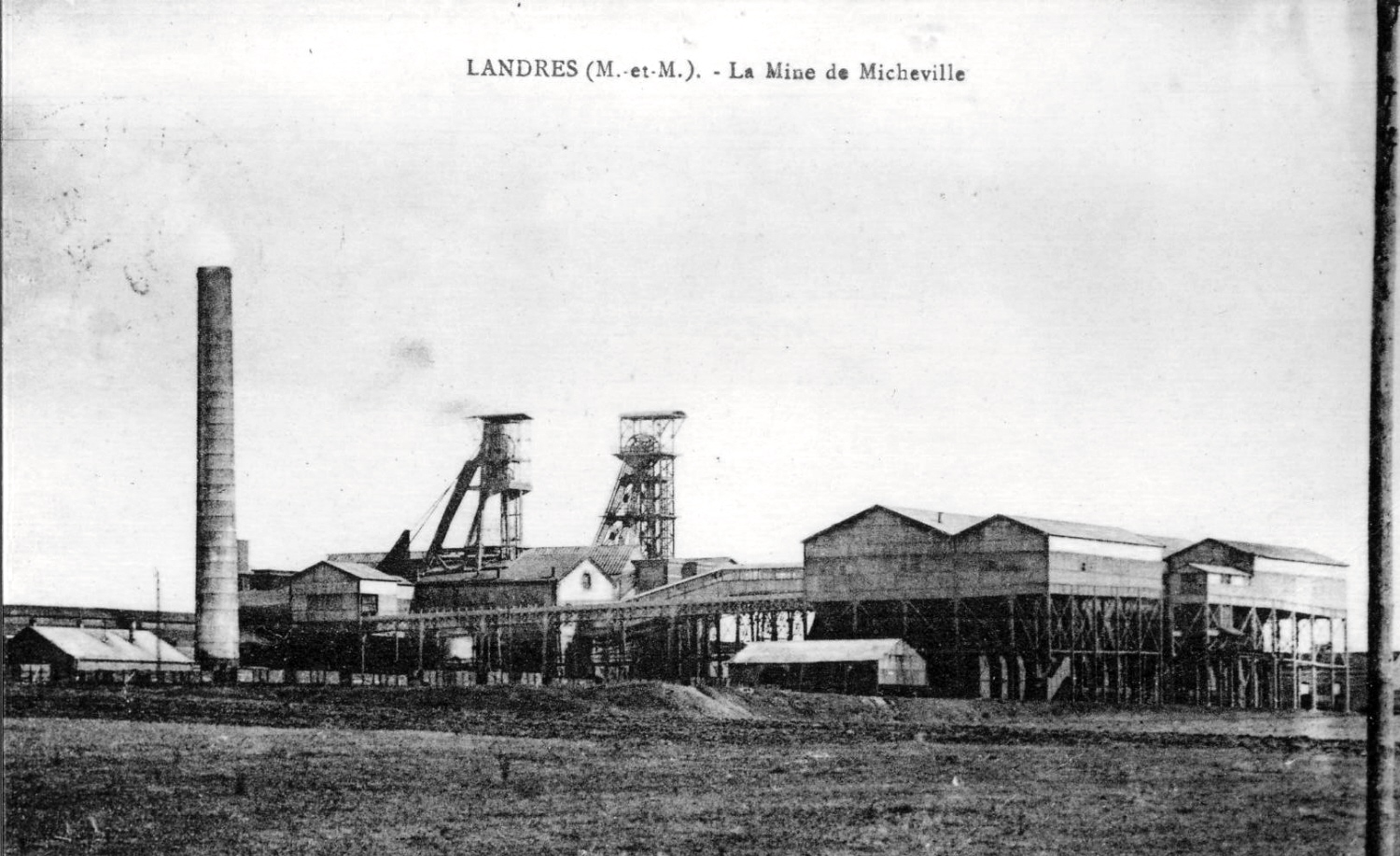
La Mine de Micheville in Landres, circa 1930

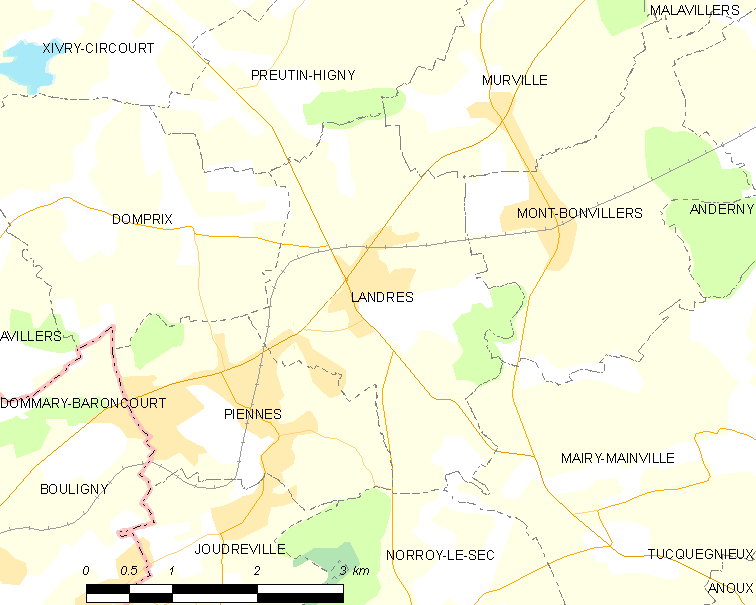
Map of the commune

== See also ==
- Communes of the Meurthe-et-Moselle department
