= Alfred Sirven =

French businessman (1927–2005)

- Born: 6 January 1927; Toulouse, France
- Died: 12 February 2005 (aged 78); Deauville, France
- Occupation: Petroleum Company Executive

Alfred Sirven (6 January 1927, in Toulouse – 12 February 2005, in Deauville) was a French businessman. During the Elf Affair, he hid in the Philippines.
