= Bezons =

- Commune
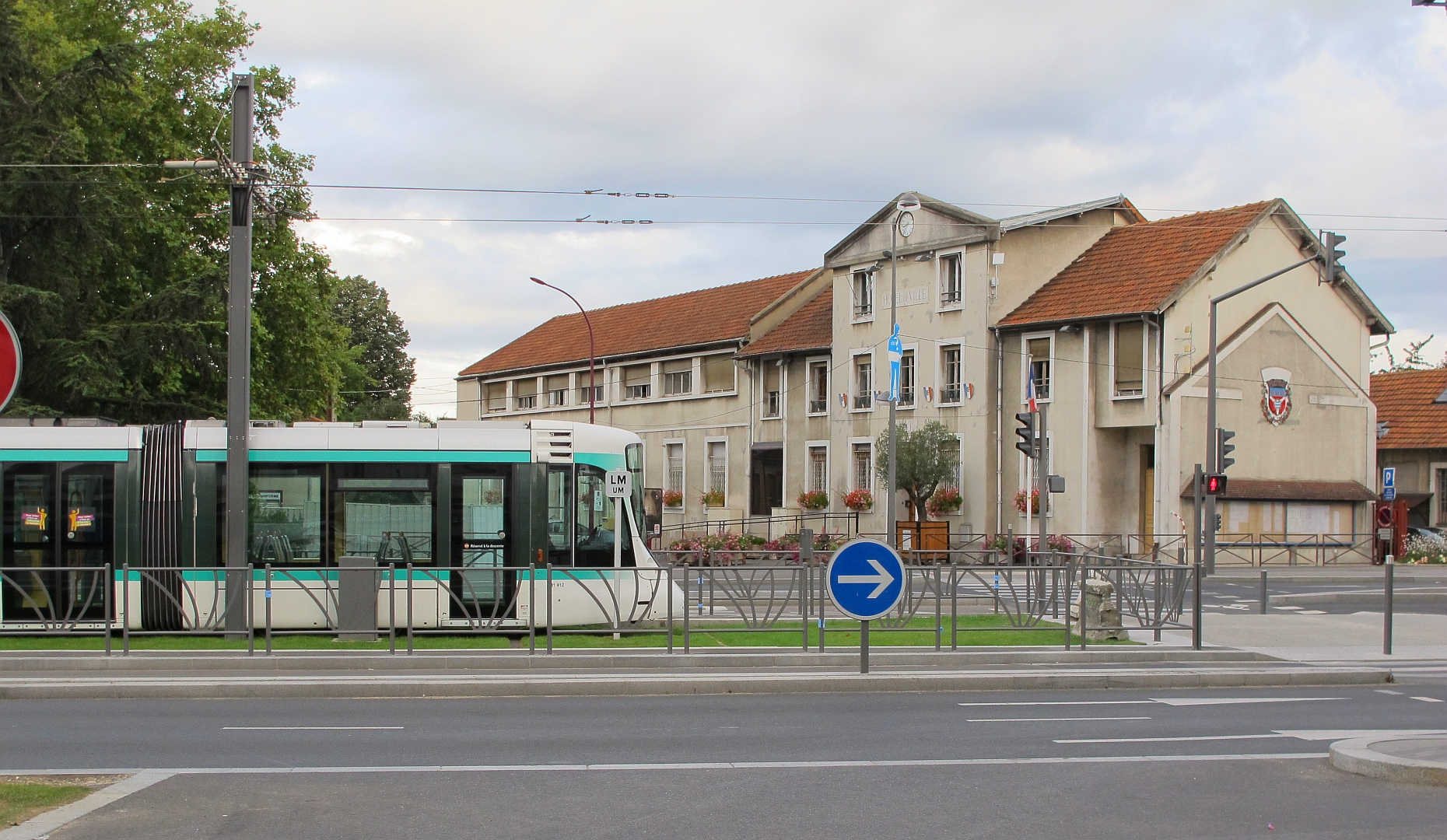
- A tram on the T2 tramway line, outside the former Hôtel de Ville (now demolished) in Bezons

- Coat of arms

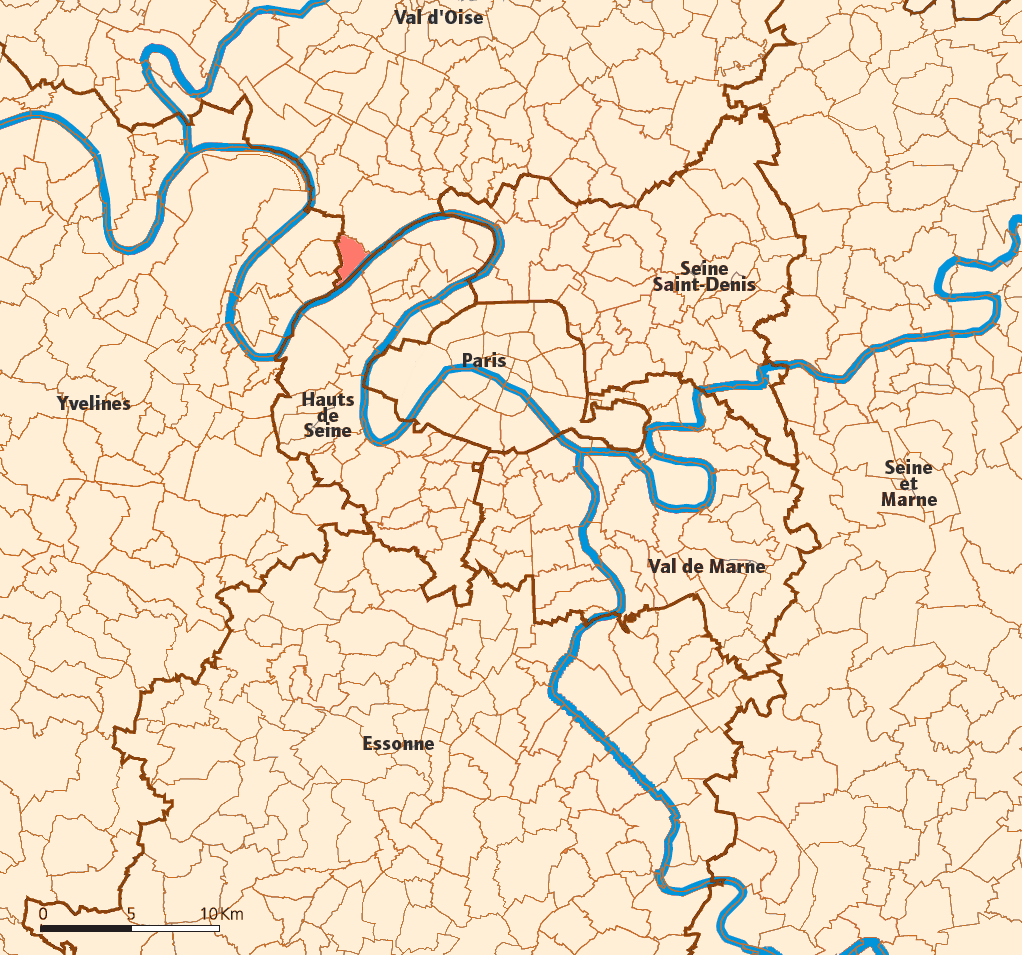
- Location (in red) within Paris inner and outer suburbs
- Location of Bezons
- Location within France Location within Île-de-France (region)
- Coordinates: 48°55′34″N 2°13′04″E
- Country: France
- Region: Île-de-France
- Department: Val-d'Oise
- Arrondissement: Argenteuil
- Canton: Argenteuil-3
- Intercommunality: CA Saint Germain Boucles Seine

Government
  - Mayor (2020–2026): Nessrine Menhaouara
- Area^{1}: 4.16 km^{2} (1.61 sq mi)
- Elevation: 41 m (135 ft)
- Highest elevation: 52 m (171 ft)
- Lowest elevation: 22 m (72 ft)
- Population (2023): 36,434
  - Density: 8,760/km^{2} (22,700/sq mi)
- Time zone: UTC+01:00 (CET)
  - Summer (DST): UTC+02:00 (CEST)
- INSEE/Postal code: 95063 /95870
- ^{1} French Land Register data, which excludes lakes, ponds, glaciers > 1 km^{2} (0.386 sq mi or 247 acres) and river estuaries.

Bezons (French pronunciation: [bəzɔ̃]) is a commune in the northwestern suburbs of Paris, France. It is located 12.6 km (7.8 mi) from the centre of Paris.

== History ==
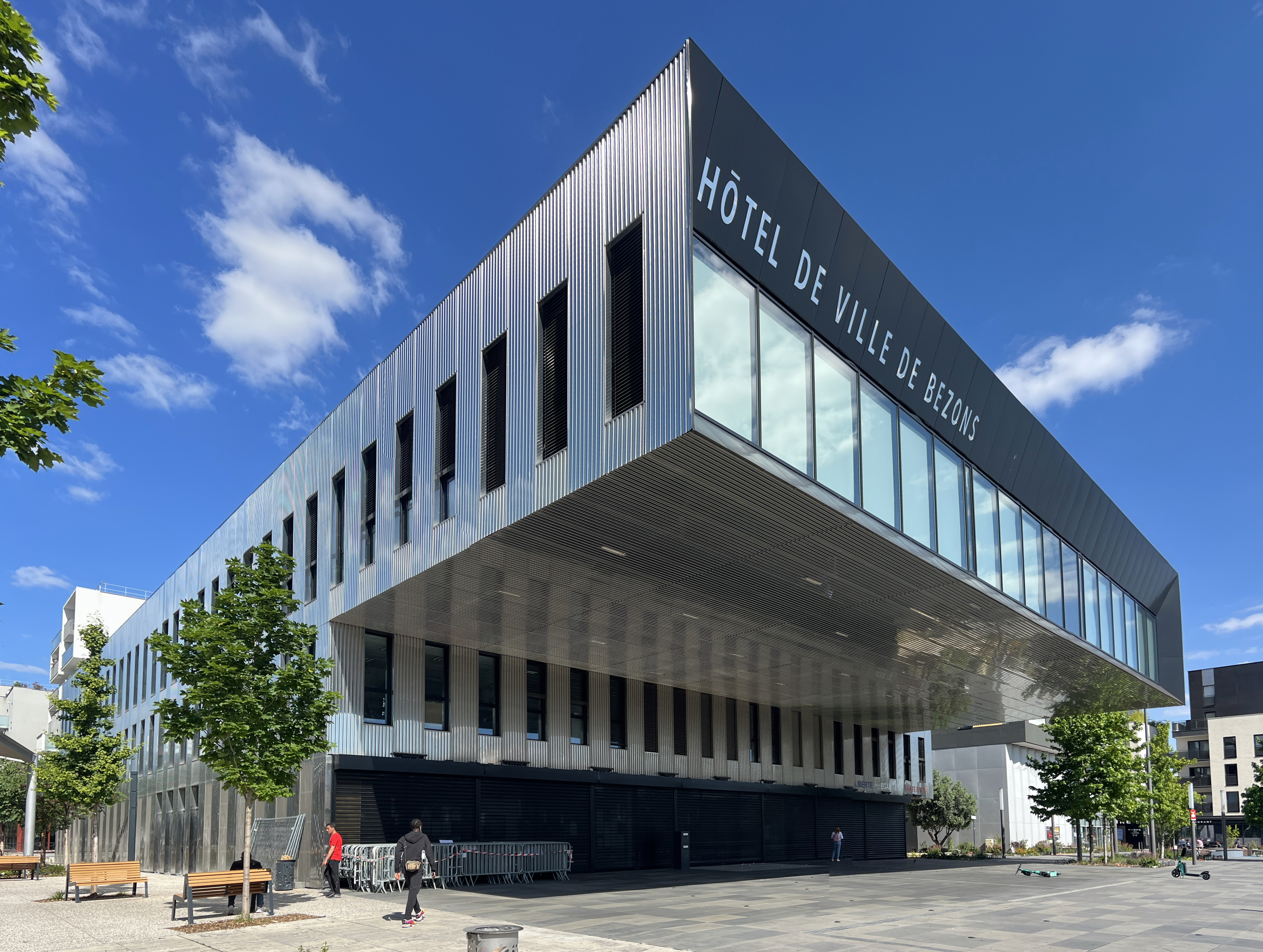
The new Hôtel de Ville

The Hôtel de Ville was completed in 2015.

== Population ==
Historical population

Year	Pop.	±% p.a.
1793	468	—
1800	459	−0.28%
1806	482	+0.82%
1821	554	+0.93%
1831	584	+0.53%
1836	608	+0.81%
1841	643	+1.13%
1846	667	+0.74%
1851	629	−1.17%
1856	626	−0.10%
1861	834	+5.91%
1866	1,237	+8.20%
1872	1,350	+1.47%
1876	1,580	+4.01%
1881	1,863	+3.35%
1886	2,001	+1.44%
1891	2,406	+3.76%
1896	2,766	+2.83%
1901	3,521	+4.95%

Year	Pop.	±% p.a.
1906	3,616	+0.53%
1911	4,980	+6.61%
1921	7,735	+4.50%
1926	10,715	+6.73%
1931	14,310	+5.96%
1936	13,964	−0.49%
1946	12,684	−0.96%
1954	16,993	+3.72%
1962	22,061	+3.32%
1968	24,475	+1.75%
1975	25,193	+0.41%
1982	24,019	−0.68%
1990	25,680	+0.84%
1999	26,263	+0.25%
2007	27,892	+0.76%
2012	28,172	+0.20%
2017	29,383	+0.85%
2023	36,434	+3.65%

Source: EHESS and INSEE (1968-2023)

== Transport ==
An extension of the tramway line T2 to Pont de Bezons opened in 2012. With Bezons not served by any stations on the Paris Métro, RER, or suburban rail network, the extension enhanced the connectivity of Bezons to the Paris public transport network. The closest train station is Houilles–Carrières-sur-Seine located in the neighbouring commune of Houilles, 2.4 km (1.5 mi) from the town centre of Bezons.

== Majdi Al-Rimawi controversy ==
In March 2013, the convicted killer of Israeli general and far-right politician Rehavam Ze'evi, Majdi Al-Rimawi, was named an "honorary resident" of Bezons. Majdi Al-Rimawi is a member of the Popular Front for the Liberation of Palestine who was sentenced to life in prison for his role in the 2001 murder of Rehavam Ze'evi.

According to Bezons' monthly newsletter, the honouring of Rimawi was the result of a unanimous decision by the Bezons local council, which described his crime as "defending his town and its inhabitants, calling for the application of international law for the establishment of Palestine to the 1967 borders as recognised by the United Nations, and Jerusalem as its capital." The decision and the newsletter made no mention of Ze'evi's killing.

In February 2013, Rimawi's son, daughter and wife were presented with the plaque honouring Rimawi at the ceremony attended by Lesparre.

The Mayor of Bezons, Dominique Lesparre, a member of the French Communist Party who has previously supported left-wing figures, stated that honouring Rimawi is a "strong political act" related to the "colonisation of the Palestinian people". On his website, Lesparre describes Rimawi as being "jailed for 10 years for taking part with his people in the struggle to resist the occupation of their country". The website reportedly contains no mention of Rehavam Ze'evi's murder. Lesparre claimed that "For these acts of resistance, he was jailed in 2002 for life + 80 years" and described him as one of many Palestinians who has been "imprisoned for daring to defend their country". Lesparre also stated that "Majdi draws his strength from the Palestinian struggle and the solidarity demonstrations throughout the world". Lesparre later stated that honouring Al-Rimawi was part of a "tradition of peace, solidarity and cooperation with the Palestinian people".

Lesparre was sharply criticized by Moshe Kantor, who stated that "It is inconceivable that an elected official can be so ignorant as to call a cold-blooded murderer a victim" and described the decision "outrageous and horrific". The Israeli Foreign Ministry also criticized the decision, stating that it was "humanly outrageous to honor a convicted murderer, no political view can justify it". Ron Prosor, who serves as Israel's ambassador to the United Nations, sharply condemned what he described as the "glorification of terrorists who deliberately murder innocent civilians" and questioned whether or not Bezons' will also grant citizenship to Anders Behring Breivik or Osama bin Laden. Abraham Foxman of the Anti-Defamation League stated, "This award is an insult to the French concept of justice and liberty and a perversion of French values" and charged that Bezons "is callously encouraging more violence against Jews".

Lesparre subsequently accused critics of the town's decision of "hatred" and "complicity in occupation" while claiming that "It strengthens our resolve to defend the noble and just Palestinian cause". Regarding Israel's opposition to the Bezons' honouring of Al-Rimawi, Lesparre stated:"It does not surprise us that this act of solidarity invokes hostile reactions by some of the participants of the occupation of Palestinian territories. Any criticism of Israeli leaders or reference to the Palestinians' suffering is systematically condemned as anti-Semitic."

In December 2014, a court ruled that the town must remove the plaque honoring Al Rimawi and declared that the Bezons' grant of honorary citizenship to Al Rimawi was invalid.

== Education ==
There are eight preschools (maternelles): Marcel-Cachin, Paul-Vaillant-Couturier, Paul-Langevin, Karl-Marx, Louise-Michel, Gabriel-Péri, Jacques-Prévert, and Victor-Hugo; as well as nine elementary schools: Marcel-Cachin, Marie-Claude et Paul Vaillant-Couturier, Paul-Langevin, Karl-Marx, Louise-Michel 1, Louise-Michel 2, Victor-Hugo 1, and Victor-Hugo 2; and a single primary school, École primaire Angela-Davis.

== Notable people ==
- Mickaël Gaffoor (1987-), footballer
- Amine Bassi (1997-), footballer

== See also ==
- Communes of the Val-d'Oise department
