= Deaths in March 2018 =

The following is a list of notable deaths in March 2018.

Entries for each day are listed alphabetically by surname. A typical entry lists information in the following sequence:

- Name, age, country of citizenship at birth, subsequent country of citizenship (if applicable), reason for notability, cause of death (if known), and reference.

== March 2018 ==
=== 1 ===
- Bender, 37, Canadian rapper.
- Fredrik Bull-Hansen, 90, Norwegian military officer, Chief of Defence (1984–1987).
- Colin Campbell, 81, English actor (A Family at War, The Ruth Rendell Mysteries).
- Harris DeVane, 54, American racing driver.
- Enrique Cárdenas González, 91, Mexican politician, Governor of Tamaulipas (1975–1981), Municipal President of Ciudad Victoria (1968–1971).
- Diana Der Hovanessian, 83, American poet and professor (Yerevan State University).
- Dorne Dibble, 88, American football player (Detroit Lions), pneumonia.
- Jean-Guy Hamelin, 92, Canadian Roman Catholic prelate, Bishop of Rouyn-Noranda (1973–2001).
- Anatoly Lein, 86, Russian-born American chess Grandmaster.
- Beth Morris, 74, Welsh actress (Son of Dracula).
- Arabinda Muduli, 56, Indian musician and Bhajan singer, cardiac arrest.
- Michael Paine, 89, American engineer.
- Vicente Piquer, 83, Spanish footballer (Valencia, Málaga, national team).
- María Rubio, 83, Mexican actress (Cuna de lobos, Imperio de cristal, Querida enemiga).
- William Sands, 88, American film editor (Funny Girl, The Only Game in Town, Lady Ice).
- Orin C. Smith, 75, American coffee executive, President and CEO of Starbucks (2000–2005), pancreatic cancer.
- Luigi Taveri, 88, Swiss motorcycle road racer, Grand Prix champion (1962, 1964, 1966), stroke.
- Eugene TeSelle, 86, American academic and church historian.
- Johann Zeitler, 90, German footballer (VfB Bayreuth, SpVgg Bayreuth).

=== 2 ===
- Barry Ansell, 70, English footballer (Aston Villa).
- James T. Baldwin, 84, American industrial designer and architect.
- Maxine Berman, 71, American politician, member of the Michigan House of Representatives (1983–1996), lung cancer.
- Dick Berg, 74, American sports promoter.
- Michael David Calnan, 85, Canadian colonel.
- Adela Calva Reyes, 50–51, Mexican Indigenous writer.
- Gordon Challis, 85, New Zealand poet.
- Dev Dines, 87, Australian rugby footballer.
- Gillo Dorfles, 107, Italian art critic, painter and philosopher.
- Ota Filip, 87, Czech novelist and journalist.
- Lee Ann Fujii, 56, American political scientist.
- Sean Garrison, 80, American actor (Moment to Moment, Splendor in the Grass, Up Periscope).
- Joey Giambra, 86, American boxer.
- Emma Gresham, 92, American teacher and politician.
- Michele Hanson, 75, British writer and columnist (The Guardian), stroke.
- Billy Herrington, 48, American gay pornographic actor, traffic collision.
- Mollie Hunt, 81, English cricketer.
- Joseph Israel, 40, American reggae musician, cancer.
- Khagendra Jamatia, 64, Indian politician, MLA (since 1988), blood cancer.
- Brandon Jenkins, 48, American red dirt singer-songwriter, complications from heart surgery.
- Walter Knabenhans, 88, Swiss Olympic rower.
- Shree Lal Joshi, 86, Indian painter.
- Barbara Kiefer Lewalski, 87, American literary scholar.
- Jesús López Cobos, 78, Spanish conductor, cancer.
- Gerry Lowe, 90, English rugby player (Warrington Wolves).
- Cle Newhook, 74, Canadian politician, leader of the NL NDP (1989–1992), cancer.
- Ronnie Prophet, 80, Canadian country singer, multiple organ failure.
- Craig Raisner, 56, American voice actor (Korgoth of Barbaria).
- Carlo Ripa di Meana, 88, Italian politician, Minister of the Environment (1992–1993) and European Commissioner for the Environment (1983–1993).
- Dale F. Rudd, 82, American chemical engineer.
- Omar Sey, 77, Gambian politician and sports administrator, Foreign Minister (1987–1994), President of Gambia Football Federation (2004–2005).
- Timothy Shelpidi, 70, Nigerian military officer.
- Sammy Stewart, 63, American baseball player (Baltimore Orioles, Boston Red Sox, Cleveland Indians).
- William Douglas Stewart, 79, Canadian politician.
- Harry J. Ufland, 81, American film producer (Snow Falling on Cedars, Not Without My Daughter, The Last Temptation of Christ).
- Louise Gray Young, 82, American astronomer.

=== 3 ===
- Sir Roger Bannister, 88, British Olympic middle-distance athlete (1952), doctor and academic, first person to run a sub-four-minute mile, Parkinson's disease.
- Clare Beghtol, 76, American-born Canadian information scientist.
- Mal Bryce, 74, Australian politician, Deputy Premier of Western Australia (1983–1988).
- Alva Campbell, 69, American convicted murderer.
- Tônia Carrero, 95, Brazilian actress (Água Viva, Louco Amor), complications from surgery.
- Leslie Coffey, 81, Australian Olympic sports shooter (1964).
- Jacqueline Desmarais, 89, Canadian billionaire philanthropist.
- Frank Doubleday, 73, American actor (Escape from New York, Assault on Precinct 13, Broadcast News), complications from esophageal cancer.
- Fred Dugan, 84, American football player (Washington Redskins, San Francisco 49ers).
- Renzo Franzo, 103, Italian politician, Deputy (1948–1968).
- Kenneth Gärdestad, 69, Swedish songwriter ("Satellit"), pneumonia and influenza following skin cancer and lymphoma.
- Jacques Gernet, 96, French sinologist.
- Vanessa Goodwin, 48, Australian politician, Attorney-General of Tasmania (2014–2017), brain cancer.
- Sabit Hadžić, 60, Bosnian Yugoslav-era basketball player, Olympic bronze medalist (1984) and coach (national team).
- Emma Hannigan, 45, Irish author, breast cancer.
- Imogene Powers Johnson, 87, American billionaire philanthropist.
- Kim Chong-hoh, 82, South Korean politician.
- Anthony Lejeune, 89, British writer.
- Lin Hu, 90, Chinese general, deputy commander of the PLA Air Force.
- Enzo Lippolis, 61, Italian archeologist.
- Virgilijus Noreika, 82, Lithuanian opera singer, People's Artist of the USSR (1970).
- Franz Pacher, 98, Austrian engineer.
- Ivone Ramos, 91, Cape Verdean writer.
- Curt Raydon, 84, American baseball player (Pittsburgh Pirates).
- Perry Rosenthal, 84, Canadian-born American eye surgeon.
- Derek Saunders, 90, English footballer (Chelsea F.C.).
- Robert Scheerer, 89, American director and actor (Star Trek, Fame, Lend an Ear).
- Arthur Stewart, 76, Northern Irish footballer (Glentoran, Derby County, Detroit Cougars).
- Ian Stewart, Baron Stewartby, 82, British politician and numismatist.
- David Ogden Stiers, 75, American actor (M*A*S*H, Beauty and the Beast, The Dead Zone), bladder cancer.
- Mike Stone, 90, American labor union leader.
- Yvon Taillandier, 91, French artist.
- Daranagama Kusaladhamma Thero, 54, Sri Lankan Buddhist monk, founder of The Buddhist TV.
- Jorge Wagensberg Lubinski, 69, Spanish physicist, academic (University of Barcelona), writer and aphorist, founder director of CosmoCaixa.
- Ken M. Wallace, 73, British engineering scientist.
- Ray Wilkins, 89, English footballer (Derby County).
- Yao Xian, 90, Chinese general, commander of the Beijing Military Region Air Force.

=== 4 ===
- Javed Abidi, 52, Indian disability rights activist, chest infection.
- Davide Astori, 31, Italian footballer (Cagliari, Fiorentina, national team), heart attack.
- Elma Bellini, 63, American judge, member of the New York Supreme Court, cancer.
- Charles Elbaum, 91, Polish-born American physicist.
- John Hollingworth, 87, British politician, MP for Birmingham All Saints (1959–1964).
- James Luna, 68, American performance artist, heart attack.
- Sir William McAlpine, 6th Baronet, 82, British engineering construction executive, managing director of Sir Robert McAlpine.
- Carmel McSharry, 91, Irish actress (In Sickness and in Health, The Liver Birds, The Man Outside).
- Farhang Mehr, 94, Iranian-born American Zoroastrian scholar and writer, Iranian Deputy Prime Minister (1973–1975).
- H. Wayne Norman Jr., 62, American politician, member of the Maryland Senate (since 2014) and House of Delegates (2008–2014).
- Charles Plummer, 87, American police sheriff.
- Moe Racine, 80, Canadian Hall of Fame football player (Ottawa Rough Riders).
- J. Paul Raines, 53, American retail executive, CEO of GameStop (2010–2017), brain cancer.
- Alex Rennie, 69, Scottish football player (St Johnstone, Dundee United) and manager (Stenhousemuir), esophageal cancer.
- Ernő Rozgonyi, 84, Hungarian politician, MP (1998–2002, 2010–2014).
- Genny Smith, 96, American publisher.
- Russell Solomon, 92, American retail executive, founder of Tower Records.
- José Triana, 87, Cuban poet.
- Johan Trondsen, 95, Norwegian politician.

=== 5 ===
- Robert Assaraf, 81, Moroccan historian.
- Trevor Baylis, 80, British inventor (windup radio).
- Wes Bender, 47, American football player (Kansas City Chiefs, Los Angeles Raiders, New Orleans Saints).
- Derek Bickerton, 91, English-born American linguist and academic.
- John H. Buchanan Jr., 89, American politician, member of the US House of Representatives for Alabama's 6th district (1965–1981), complications from dementia.
- Seán Byrne, 80, Irish politician.
- John T. Cacioppo, 66, American neuroscientist and psychologist.
- Tomas Aguon Camacho, 84, Northern Mariana Islands Roman Catholic prelate, Bishop of Chalan Kanoa (1984–2010).
- Mykhaylo Chemberzhi, 73, Ukrainian composer.
- Kjerstin Dellert, 92, Swedish opera singer.
- George Downing, 87, American surfer.
- Bob Engel, 84, American baseball umpire.
- Dorothy Henriques-Wells, 92, Jamaican painter.
- Rafiqul Islam, 82, Bangladeshi physician.
- Costakis Koutsokoumnis, 61, Cypriot football administrator, President of CFA (since 2001) and member of FIFA Council (since 2017), cancer.
- André S. Labarthe, 86, French actor (Vivre sa vie), film producer and director.
- Marcela Lombardo Otero, 91, Mexican politician, Deputy (1976–1979, 1988–1991).
- Uri Lubrani, 91, Israeli diplomat and military official.
- Paul Magriel, 71, American backgammon and poker player and author, World Backgammon champion (1978).
- Helmut Maucher, 90, German food and beverage executive, CEO (1990–1997) and chairman (1990–2000) of Nestlé.
- Howard L. Resnikoff, 80, American mathematician.
- Gemma Romanyà i Valls, 72, Spanish businesswoman, printer and graphic arts patron.
- Jam Saqi, 73, Pakistani politician.
- Clive Sinclair, 70, British author, prostate cancer.
- D. Sreedevi, 78, Indian judge, member of the Kerala High Court (1997–2001), liver failure.
- Clarence F. Stephens, 100, American mathematician and educator.
- Stephan Tanneberger, 82, German oncologist and chemist, blood and bone cancer.
- Michael Watts, 79, British journalist.
- Hayden White, 89, American historian.

=== 6 ===
- Arthur Barrett, 73, Jamaican cricketer (West Indies).
- Lucie Brock-Broido, 61, American poet and academic, cancer.
- Paul Bùi Văn Đọc, 73, Vietnamese Roman Catholic prelate, Archbishop of Ho Chi Minh City (since 2014), stroke.
- Donna Butterworth, 62, American actress (Paradise, Hawaiian Style, The Family Jewels) and singer.
- William G. Callow, 96, American judge, member of the Wisconsin Supreme Court (1977–1992).
- Frank Cappelli, 65, American singer and actor (Cappelli & Company), heart attack.
- Muhibbe Darga, 96, Turkish archeologist.
- Aliyu Doma, 75, Nigerian politician, Governor of Nasarawa State (2007–2011).
- Peter Freund, 81, Romanian-born American physicist.
- Erivan Haub, 85, German retail executive (Tengelmann Group).
- Amani W. A. Kabourou, 68, Tanzanian politician, MP for Kigoma (1995–2015).
- John Kurila, 76, Scottish footballer (Northampton Town, Celtic).
- Peter Nicholls, 78, Australian writer and editor (The Encyclopedia of Science Fiction).
- Octavio Novaro, 78, Mexican physicist specialized in theoretical catalysis, awarded the National Prize for Arts and Sciences (1983) and UNESCO Science Prize (1993).
- Francis Piasecki, 66, French football player (Metz, national team) and coach (Strasbourg).
- Ferdousi Priyabhashini, 71, Bangladeshi sculptor, heart attack.
- Indra Bahadur Rai, 91, Indian writer.
- John W. Reed, 99, American legal scholar.
- Irving Shain, 92, American chemist and educator, Chancellor of University of Wisconsin-Madison (1977–1986).
- Shammi, 88, Indian actress (Dil Apna Aur Preet Parai, Khuda Gawah, Dekh Bhai Dekh).
- Zena Skinner, 91, British television chef.
- Jeff St John, 71, Australian musician, bacterial infection.
- Steve Stroughter, 65, American baseball player (Seattle Mariners).
- Sir John Sulston, 75, British biologist, Nobel Prize laureate (2002), stomach cancer.

=== 7 ===
- Fortunato Abat, 92, Filipino army general and politician, Secretary of the Department of National Defense (1997–1998).
- Rinus van Beek, 70, Dutch Olympic swimmer.
- Reynaldo Bignone, 90, Argentine politician and convicted criminal, President (1982–1983), hip fracture and heart failure.
- Gary Burden, 84, American rock album cover artist (After the Gold Rush, Morrison Hotel, Déjà Vu), Grammy winner (2010).
- Chen Tien-miao, 89, Taiwanese politician.
- Jacques Clemens, 108, Dutch Roman Catholic priest.
- Woody Durham, 76, American college basketball radio announcer (North Carolina Tar Heels), complications from primary progressive aphasia.
- Hao Bailin, 83, Chinese physicist.
- Don Hardy, 96, English motorcycle speedway rider.
- Victor Heringer, 29, Brazilian novelist, translator (First They Killed My Father) and poet, Prêmio Jabuti laureate (2013), suspected suicide by self-defenestration.
- Jerzy Milian, 82, Polish jazz vibraphonist.
- John Molyneux, 87, English footballer (Chester City, Liverpool).
- Antonia La Negra, 82, Spanish cantaora and bailaora, aortic aneurysm.
- Chuck Ortmann, 88, American football player (Pittsburgh Steelers, Dallas Texans).
- William J. Pulte, 85, American real estate developer (PulteGroup).
- Werner Radspieler, 79, German Roman Catholic prelate, Auxiliary Bishop of Bamberg (1986–2013).
- Cheri Register, 72, American author and educator.
- Thomas L. Rhodes, 78, American political activist, Parkinson's disease.
- Marian Schmidt, 73, Polish artist photographer, mathematician.
- Charles Thone, 94, American politician, Governor of Nebraska (1979–1983), member of the US House of Representatives for Nebraska's 1st district (1971–1979).
- Rosemarie Totaro, 84, American politician.
- Kjell Venås, 90, Norwegian philologist.
- Other Windsor-Clive, 3rd Earl of Plymouth, 94, British landowner.

=== 8 ===
- Eduard Antoch, 85, Czech Olympic rower.
- Bernardo Bernardo, 73, Filipino actor, pancreatic cancer.
- Ron Franklin, 58, American jockey, Kentucky Derby winner (1979), lung cancer.
- John P. Fullam, 96, American federal judge, member of the U.S. District Court for Eastern Pennsylvania (since 1966), presided over Abscam trial.
- Sir Wilson Harris, 96, Guyanese writer (Palace of the Peacock).
- Antoni Imiela, 63, German-born British serial rapist.
- Jean Jolivet, 93, French philosopher.
- Milko Kelemen, 93, Croatian composer.
- Ralph Keller, 82, Canadian ice hockey player (New York Rangers, Hershey Bears).
- Pearse Lyons, 73, Irish biochemist and beverage executive, founder and chairman of Alltech, complications following heart surgery.
- Frank Ray Perilli, 92, American screenwriter (Alligator, Dracula's Dog, The Doberman Gang).
- Bill Snow, 80, Australian anti-tobacco activist (BUGA UP), ruptured aorta.
- Gerd Søraa, 83, Norwegian politician and writer.
- Peter Temple, 71, South African-born Australian writer (The Broken Shore, Truth, White Dog), Miles Franklin Award winner (2010), Gold Dagger (2006), cancer.
- Albin Vidović, 75, Croatian handball player, Olympic champion (1972).
- Togo D. West Jr., 75, American public servant, Secretary of Veterans Affairs (1998–2000), heart attack.
- Hal Wick, 73, American politician, member of the South Dakota House of Representatives (1977–1981, 1995–1999, 2001–2009, 2011–2015).
- Kate Wilhelm, 89, American author (The Infinity Box, Where Late the Sweet Birds Sang).
- Ercan Yazgan, 71, Turkish actor, multiple organ failure.

=== 9 ===
- Jerry Anderson, 62, Canadian professional golfer, first Canadian to win on PGA European tour, leukemia.
- Robin Archer, 87, New Zealand rugby union player (national team, Southland, Otago) and coach (Southland).
- Joaquin Avila, 69, American civil rights activist and jurist.
- Remo Bicchierai, 79, Italian footballer (Catania).
- Don Eitner, 83, American actor.
- Dennis Furlong, 72, Canadian politician and physician, MLA for Dalhousie-Restigouche East (1999–2003), brain tumour.
- Chris Gedney, 47, American football player (Chicago Bears, Arizona Cardinals), suicide by gunshot.
- Vladimir Gerasimov, 28, Russian footballer, traffic collision.
- Oskar Gröning, 96, German SS officer and war criminal, guard at Auschwitz concentration camp.
- Warren Hawksley, 74, British politician, MP for The Wrekin (1979–1987) and Halesowen and Stourbridge (1992–1997).
- Zdravko Hlebanja, 88, Slovenian Olympic cross-country skier.
- Jo Min-ki, 52, South Korean actor (East of Eden, The Cut, The Attorney) and professor, suspected suicide by hanging.
- Jung Jae-sung, 35, South Korean badminton player, Olympic bronze medallist (2012), heart attack.
- Patangrao Kadam, 74, Indian politician, kidney disease.
- Joy Michael, 91, Indian theatre director.
- Ulla Nenonen, 84, Finnish missionary and Bible translator.
- Adam Ostrowski, 99, Polish World War II RAF officer.
- John Roe, 58, British mathematician.
- Harold Rosewarne, 87, Australian footballer (South Melbourne).
- Franco Scisciani, 84, Italian Olympic boxer.
- George A. Sinner, 89, American politician, Governor of North Dakota (1985–1992).
- Ethel Stein, 100, American textile artist.
- Millie Dunn Veasey, 100, American civil rights activist.
- Ion Voinescu, 88, Romanian Olympic footballer (1952).
- Elías Yanes Álvarez, 90, Spanish Roman Catholic prelate, Archbishop of Zaragoza (1977–2005).

=== 10 ===
- Peter Allday, 90, British Olympic hammer thrower (1952, 1956).
- Tony Benneworth, 67, Australian cricketer (Tasmania) and politician, MHA for Bass (1992–1998), boating incident.
- Christine Bernardi, 62, French mathematician.
- Garech Browne, 78, Irish arts patron, founder of Claddagh Records.
- Donald Collins, 92, American politician, member of the Maine Senate (1976–1992) and House of Representatives (1970–1976).
- Buddy Cruze, 84, American football player (Chicago Bears, Baltimore Colts, Tennessee Volunteers).
- Peter Davies, 60, Australian cricketer.
- Eloise Alma Flagg, 99, American school principal.
- Michael Gershman, 73, American cinematographer, director and camera operator (Buffy the Vampire Slayer, Crossing Jordan, The Deer Hunter).
- Hubert de Givenchy, 91, French fashion designer (Givenchy).
- Wally Gould, 79, English footballer (York City, Brighton, Hellenic).
- Geoff Hibbins, 88, Australian footballer (St Kilda).
- Ken Houston, 64, Canadian ice hockey player (Atlanta Flames, Washington Capitals), cancer.
- Armand Huberty, 87, Luxembourgish Olympic gymnast (1952, 1960).
- Bogo Jan, 74, Slovenian Olympic ice hockey player (1964, 1968, 1972).
- Ali Asghar Khodadoust, 82, Iranian surgical ophthalmologist, namesake of Khodadoust line, heart disease.
- Henry Koffler, 95, Austrian-born American academic, President of the University of Arizona (1982–1991).
- Saba Mahmood, 57, Pakistani-born American anthropologist (University of California at Berkeley), pancreatic cancer.
- Abubakar Saleh Michika, 77, Nigerian politician, Governor of Adamawa State (1992–1993).
- Val Mulkerns, 93, Irish writer and poet.
- Roch Pedneault, 90, Canadian Roman Catholic prelate, Auxiliary Bishop of Chicoutimi (1974–2002).
- George Rawitscher, 90, German-born American physicist.
- Michel Raynaud, 79, French mathematician.
- Gene Rhodes, 90, American basketball player (Indianapolis Olympians) and coach (Kentucky Colonels).
- Tang Hsiang Chien, 94, Hong Kong industrialist.
- Jozef Timmerman, 76, Belgian cyclist.
- Ralf Waldmann, 51, German Grand Prix motorcycle road racer.

=== 11 ===
- Alba Arnova, 87, Argentine-Italian ballerina and actress (Miracle in Milan, A Slice of Life).
- Muhammad Ashiq, 82, Pakistani Olympic racing cyclist (1960, 1964), stroke.
- Bob Baxt, 79, Australian jurist, chairman of Trade Practices Commission (1988–1991).
- Jean Damascène Bimenyimana, 64, Rwandan Roman Catholic prelate, Bishop of Cyangugu (since 1997).
- Baltasar Corrada del Río, 82, Puerto Rican judge and politician, Mayor of San Juan (1985–1989) and Secretary of State (1993–1995).
- Peter H. Dailey, 87, American advertising executive and diplomat, Ambassador to Ireland (1982–1984).
- John Daly, 81, Australian athletics coach.
- Lorenz Dittmann, 89, German art historian.
- Sir Ken Dodd, 90, English comedian (Diddy Men), singer ("Tears") and actor (Hamlet), chest infection.
- Paddy Donovan, 81, New Zealand Olympic boxer (1956, 1964), British Empire and Commonwealth Games bronze medalist (1958, 1962), and rugby union player (Hawke's Bay).
- Luciano Faraguti, 80, Italian politician, Deputy (1979–1994).
- Alwyn Harris, 82, Welsh cricketer.
- Dean Hubbard, 64, American trombonist.
- Pete James, 60, British archivist.
- Kwayzar, 90, American rapper.
- Cooper H. Langford, 83, American-born Canadian chemist, pancreatic cancer.
- Karl Lehmann, 81, German Roman Catholic Cardinal prelate, Bishop of Mainz (1983–2016), complications from a stroke.
- Mary LeMessurier, 88, Canadian politician, Alberta MLA (1979–1986).
- Graziella Mascia, 64, Italian politician, Deputy (2001–2008).
- H. Blair Neatby, 93, Canadian historian.
- David W. Noble, 92, American historian.
- Stephen A. Orthwein, 72, American polo player and executive, president and chairman of US Polo.
- Siegfried Rauch, 85, German actor (Patton, Le Mans, Das Traumschiff), heart failure and injuries sustained in a fall.
- Mary Rosenblum, 65, American author (Synthesis & Other Virtual Realities), plane crash.
- Charles Sarkis, 78, American restaurateur (Back Bay Restaurant Group) and dog racetrack owner (Wonderland Greyhound Park), complications from brain cancer.
- Henri Skiba, 90, French football player (Nîmes, Sochaux) and manager (Grasshoppers).
- Alline Banks Sprouse, 96, American basketball player.
- Charles D. Strang, 96, American inventor, President of the Outboard Marine Corporation.
- Mario Vegetti, 81, Italian historian.
- John Wiersema, 62, Canadian accountant and civil servant, auditor general (2011).
- Sándor Záborszky, 83, Hungarian Olympic swimmer (1956).

=== 12 ===
- José Arranz, 88, Spanish priest.
- Miguel Barceló Pérez, 94, Spanish politician, Senator (since 1986).
- José Bernárdez, 82, Spanish cyclist.
- Jim Culbreath, 65, American football player (Green Bay Packers, New York Giants, Philadelphia Eagles).
- Ivan Davis, 86, American classical pianist, stroke.
- Ralph Doolan, 84, American politician, member of the New Hampshire House of Representatives (2012–2014).
- Danièle Dorice, 82, Canadian singer.
- Nokie Edwards, 82, American Hall of Fame instrumental and surf rock musician (The Ventures), complications from hip surgery.
- Ken Flach, 54, American tennis player, Olympic (1988) and Wimbledon champion (1986–1988), complications from pneumonia.
- Nikolai Glushkov, 68, Russian businessman (Aeroflot, AutoVAZ), homicide by neck compression.
- Irv Greengo, 93, American politician.
- Torstein Hansen, 74, Norwegian Olympic handball player.
- Richard O. Hart, 90, American politician.
- Sverrir Hermannsson, 88, Icelandic politician, Minister of Industry (1983–1985) and Education (1985–1987).
- Kong Bai Ji, 85, Chinese artist.
- Craig Mack, 47, American rapper ("Flava in Ya Ear"), heart failure.
- Rudolf Mang, 67, German weightlifter, Olympic silver medalist (1972), heart attack.
- Henry Minarik, 90, American football player (Pittsburgh Steelers).
- Bud Olsen, 77, American basketball player (Seattle SuperSonics, Detroit Pistons).
- Charlie Quintana, 56, American rock drummer (Social Distortion, The Plugz, Cracker), heart attack.
- Nikki Sievwright, 75, British model and soldier.
- Oleg Tabakov, 82, Russian actor (War and Peace, Oblomov), artistic director of the Moscow Art Theatre.
- William Teron, 85, Canadian land developer.
- Emily Stipes Watts, 81, American literary historian.
- Olly Wilson, 80, American composer, musicologist and jazz musician.
- Jeremiah Wolfe, 93, American Cherokee elder.

=== 13 ===
- Ivano Beggio, 73, Italian transportation executive, President of Aprilia (1969–2004).
- Prem Bhatia, 78, Indian cricketer.
- T. Berry Brazelton, 99, American pediatrician and author.
- Gloria Cordes, 86, American baseball player (Kalamazoo Lassies).
- Philip J. Davis, 95, American applied mathematician.
- Bebeto de Freitas, 68, Brazilian Olympic volleyball coach (1984) and football manager (Clube Atlético Mineiro), World Championship (1998), heart attack.
- Brenda Dean, Baroness Dean of Thornton-le-Fylde, 74, British trade unionist and peer.
- Claudia Fontaine, 57, British singer (Afrodiziak) and backing vocalist (Pink Floyd, Elvis Costello).
- Hamida Habibullah, 101, Indian politician, member of Rajya Sabha (1976–1982) and MLA for Haidergarh.
- Leonid Kvinikhidze, 80, Russian screenwriter and film director (Mary Poppins, Goodbye).
- Ken Mulhearn, 72, British footballer (Shrewsbury Town, Stockport County, Manchester City).
- Emily Nasrallah, 86, Lebanese writer and women's rights activist.
- Jens Nilsson, 69, Swedish politician, MEP (since 2011), Chairman of Östersund Municipality (1997–2009).
- Antonio Pais, 79, Spanish footballer (Celta Vigo, Barcelona, Real Zaragoza).
- J. L. Parks, 90, American basketball player (Oklahoma State Cowboys).
- Dave Ragan, 82, American professional golfer.
- Nora Schimming-Chase, 77, Namibian politician and diplomat, member of the National Assembly (since 2000), ambassador to Germany, Austria and Tanzania, cancer.
- Aldo Tarlao, 91, Italian rower, Olympic silver medalist (1948).
- Václav Verner, 68, Czech speedway rider.
- Gordon Walgren, 85, American politician, member of the Washington House of Representatives (1966), member of the Washington State Senate (1967–1980).
- Katherine Westphal, 99, American textile designer.
- Henry Williams, 47, American basketball player (Charlotte 49ers, Scaligera Verona, Benetton Treviso, Virtus Roma), world championship bronze medalist (1990), kidney failure.
- Jimmy Wisner, 86, American pianist, producer and songwriter.

=== 14 ===
- Robert L. Bireley, 84, American historian.
- Jim Bowen, 80, English television presenter (Bullseye) and comedian (The Comedians).
- Alfred W. Crosby, 87, American ecological historian, complications from Parkinson's disease.
- Halit Deringör, 95, Turkish footballer (Fenerbahçe).
- Emilio Disi, 75, Argentine actor (Todas las azafatas van al cielo, La Aventura explosiva, Muerte en Buenos Aires) and humorist, lung cancer.
- Bedřich Dvořák, 87, Czech Olympic sprint canoeist.
- Elusive Quality, 25, American racehorse, euthanized.
- Peter Entwisle, 69, English-born New Zealand art historian.
- Marielle Franco, 38, Brazilian politician, member of the Municipal Chamber of Rio de Janeiro (since 2017), shot.
- Rubén Galván, 65, Argentine footballer (national team, Club Atlético Independiente, Estudiantes), cirrhosis.
- Stephen Hawking, 76, English theoretical physicist, professor (University of Cambridge) and writer (A Brief History of Time), complications from amyotrophic lateral sclerosis.
- Narendra Jha, 55, Indian actor (Raees, Haider, Raavan), heart attack.
- Michael Jones, 73, Canadian film director and screenwriter.
- Palle Kjærulff-Schmidt, 86, Danish film director (Once There Was a War) and screenwriter.
- Lefty Kreh, 93, American sports photojournalist, author and sport fisherman.
- Adrian Lamo, 37, American computer hacker (WikiLeaks).
- Steve Mandell, 76, American bluegrass guitarist and banjoist, prostate cancer.
- Billy Martin, 75, American football player (Chicago Bears, Atlanta Falcons, Minnesota Vikings).
- David Matza, 87, American sociologist and criminologist.
- Mac McCallion, 67, New Zealand rugby union player (Counties, New Zealand Māori) and coach (Counties Manukau, Fiji), cancer.
- Liam O'Flynn, 72, Irish uilleann piper (Planxty), cancer.
- Pijuán, 75, Puerto Rican pianist.
- Ronald Rotunda, 73, American legal scholar, pneumonia.
- Vasilios Sakellarakis, 84, Greek Olympic triple jumper.
- Petar Stipetić, 80, Croatian military officer, Armed Forces Chief of Staff (2000–2002).
- Tawfiq Titingan, 55, Malaysian politician, MLA, colon cancer.
- Vasantha Vaidyanathan, 80, Sri Lankan Hindu activist and radio broadcaster.
- David Wyman, 89, American historian (The Abandonment of the Jews).

=== 15 ===
- Francis M. Bator, 92, Hungarian-American economist and educator.
- Tom Benson, 90, American automobile dealer, philanthropist and sports franchise owner (New Orleans Saints, New Orleans Pelicans), influenza.
- Stan Brown, 76, English footballer (Fulham).
- Beeson Carroll, 83, American actor.
- Ed Charles, 84, American baseball player (New York Mets, Kansas City Athletics).
- Bev Desjarlais, 62, Canadian politician, MP for Churchill (1997–2004), multiple system atrophy as a complication of Parkinson's disease.
- Erwin C. Dietrich, 87, Swiss film producer (The Wild Geese).
- Augie Garrido, 79, American college baseball coach (Cal State Fullerton, Texas), stroke.
- Carlton Gary, 67, American serial killer and rapist, executed by lethal injection.
- Michael Getler, 82, American journalist (The Washington Post, The New York Times International Edition, PBS), complications from bile duct cancer.
- Robert Grossman, 78, American painter, sculptor, filmmaker and author.
- Jørgen Hansen, 74, Danish Olympic boxer (1968).
- Huang Wenpan, 22, Chinese swimmer, Paralympic champion (2016), traffic collision.
- Larry Kwong, 94, Canadian ice hockey player (Valleyfield Braves, New York Rangers), first player to break NHL's colour barrier.
- Bronson La Follette, 82, American politician, Wisconsin Attorney General (1965–1969, 1975–1987).
- Ling Yun, 100, Chinese politician, 1st Minister of Public Security (1983–1985).
- Don Mecklem, 91, Australian Olympic hockey player.
- Marlene Mountain, 78, American poet.
- Eric Munshaw, 64, Canadian Olympic slalom canoer (1972).
- Franz Oberwinkler, 78, German mycologist.
- Bob Phibbs, 90, Canadian Olympic basketball player (1952).
- Gwilym Roberts, 89, British politician, MP (1966–1970, 1974–1983).
- Mohamed Sayah, 84, Tunisian politician.
- Florence Shutsy-Reynolds, 95, American aviator.
- John Simus, 75, American ice hockey player.
- Joan Scott Wallace, 87, American academic.

=== 16 ===
- Félix Arámbulo, 76, Paraguayan footballer.
- Betty Ann Bowser, 73, American journalist (PBS NewsHour), pneumonia.
- John Brookes, 84, British landscape designer.
- Anna Campbell, 26, British feminist and soldier, airstrike.
- Barrie Clark, 85, Canadian politician and broadcaster.
- Guy Cury, 87, French Olympic hurdler (1956).
- Russell Freedman, 88, American biographer and children's writer.
- Charles Wayne Goforth, 86, American politician.
- Leslie Gonda, 98, Hungarian-born American aircraft leasing executive (International Lease Finance Corporation).
- Boyukagha Hajiyev, 59, Azerbaijani football player and manager (Araz-Naxçıvan, Neftçi), complications from a heart attack.
- Tankmar Horn, 93, Finnish diplomat and business executive (Wärtsilä).
- Guðjón Arnar Kristjánsson, 73, Icelandic politician, MP (1999–2009), cancer.
- Otomar Kvěch, 67, Czech composer.
- Kwon Hee-deok, 61, South Korean voice actress and writer.
- Arnie Lerma, 67, American writer and Scientology whistleblower, suicide by gunshot.
- Adrian Lillebekk Ovlien, 20, Norwegian footballer (Kongsvinger), sepsis.
- Dayton S. Mak, 100, American diplomat, Ambassador to Kuwait (1961–1963).
- Aidan Maloney, 97, Canadian politician, MHA for Ferryland (1966–1971).
- Magoroh Maruyama, 88, Japanese-born American business theorist.
- Milán Matos, 68, Cuban Olympic long jumper (1972, 1976).
- George Meek, 84, Scottish footballer (Leeds United, Walsall).
- Jane Moffet, 87, American baseball player (AAGPBL).
- Winonah Myers, 76, American civil rights activist.
- Buell Neidlinger, 82, American cellist and bassist, heart attack.
- Ezequiel Orozco, 29, Mexican footballer, lung cancer.
- Lisa Garcia Quiroz, 57, American media executive (Time Warner), pancreatic cancer.
- Lucien A. Schmit Jr., 89, American engineer.
- Louise Slaughter, 88, American politician, member of the US House of Representatives for New York's 25th district (since 1987), complications from a fall.
- John Smith, 90, Canadian poet.
- Raymond Wilson, 89, British physicist.
- Charles Yanofsky, 92, American geneticist.
- Marilyn J. Ziffrin, 91, American composer.

=== 17 ===
- Sir William Aldous, 82, British jurist, Lord Justice of Appeal (1995–2003).
- Karen Anderson, 85, American writer.
- Arnold Burden, 95, Canadian physician, helped rescue survivors in the 1956 and 1958 Springhill mining disasters.
- Dexter Davies, 66, Australian politician, member of the Western Australian Legislative Council (1998–2001), lung cancer.
- Nicholas Edwards, Baron Crickhowell, 84, British politician, Secretary of State for Wales (1979–1987).
- Geneviève Fontanel, 81, French actress (The Man Who Loved Women).
- Benny Fredriksson, 58, Swedish actor and theatre director, CEO of Stockholm City Theatre (2002–2017), suicide.
- John Furlow, 88, American college football player and coach.
- Peter Haynes, 92, British Anglican priest, Dean of Hereford (1982–1992).
- Jim Hendricks, 68, American actor and DJ (Commander USA's Groovie Movies).
- Julie Hilden, 49, American novelist and lawyer, complications from early-onset Alzheimer's disease.
- Ned Kavanagh, 93, Irish hurler and priest.
- Mike MacDonald, 62, Canadian comedian and actor (The Ripping Friends, Screwballs II), heart complications.
- Zdeněk Mahler, 89, Czech pedagogue, writer, publicist and musicologist.
- Katherine McGrath, 73, American actress.
- Phan Văn Khải, 84, Vietnamese politician, Prime Minister (1997–2006).
- Greg Polis, 67, Canadian ice hockey player (Pittsburgh Penguins, New York Rangers, Washington Capitals), cancer.
- Karen Saywitz, 61, American psychologist and author.
- Sushil Siddharth, 59, Indian writer, complications from a heart attack.
- Tom Slater, 72, American politician, complications from Crohn's disease.
- Sammy Williams, 69, American actor (A Chorus Line), Tony winner (1976), cancer.
- Za Hlei Thang, 75, Burmese politician.

=== 18 ===
- Michel Adama-Tamboux, 89, Central African politician, President of the National Assembly (1960–1966).
- Chuck Arrobio, 73, American football player (Minnesota Vikings).
- Sally Bidgood, 69, British botanist.
- Cloria Brown, 75, American politician, member of the Missouri House of Representatives (2011–2013, since 2015), cancer.
- Sergio Castellaneta, 86, Italian politician, member of the Chamber of Deputies (1992–1996).
- David Cooper, 68, Australian immunologist and medical researcher (HIV), President of the International AIDS Society (1994–1998).
- Ruth F. Curtain, 76, Australian mathematician.
- Joyce Cutler–Shaw, 85, American artist, corticobasal degeneration.
- Samuel Epstein, 91, English-born American physician, cardiac arrest.
- Vera Evison, 100, British archaeologist and academic.
- Barkat Gourad Hamadou, 88, Djiboutian politician, Prime Minister (1978–2001).
- Michal Horský, 74, Slovak political scientist and politician, member of the House of the People (1990–1992).
- Killjoy, 48, American singer (Necrophagia), heart failure.
- Helmut Kuckelkorn, 81, German cyclist.
- Li Ao, 82, Chinese-Taiwanese writer and politician, MLY (2005–2008), brain tumour.
- Georgi Mosolov, 91, Russian test pilot.
- Jean-Baptiste Natama, 53, Burkinabé politician and diplomat.
- Stefano Pellegrini, 64, Italian footballer (Roma, Bari).
- Herbert A. Posner, 93, American politician.
- Otoniel Quintana, 71, Colombian Olympic footballer (1968).
- Ivor Richard, Baron Richard, 85, British politician and diplomat, Lord Privy Seal (1997–1998), ambassador to UN (1974–1979), MP for Barons Court (1964–1974).
- Michael Rutschky, 74, German author.
- Jerry Schoonmaker, 84, American baseball player (Washington Senators).
- Hazel Smith, 83, American country music journalist, publicist, and singer-songwriter, heart failure.
- Clive Ulyate, 84, South African rugby player and cricketer.
- Sir James Weatherall, 82, British vice-admiral and Marshal of the Diplomatic Corps.
- John F. Wright, 72, American state judge, member of the Nebraska Supreme Court (since 1994) and Court of Appeals (1991–1994).

=== 19 ===
- Roger G. Barry, 82, British-born American geographer and climatologist, director of the National Snow and Ice Data Center (1976–2008).
- Irina Beglyakova, 85, Russian athlete, Olympic silver medalist (1956).
- Linda Bement, 76, American model, winner of Miss Universe 1960.
- Madge Bester, 54, South African disability rights activist, once world's shortest woman.
- David Bischoff, 66, American novelist and television writer (Star Trek: The Next Generation).
- Howard Clendaniel, 85, American politician, member of the Delaware House of Representatives.
- Sue England, 89, American actress (City Across the River, The Women of Pitcairn Island).
- Julio Garrett, 92, Bolivian politician, lawyer and ambassador, Foreign Minister (1979–1980) and Vice President (1985–1989).
- Sir Andrew Gilbart, 68, British High Court judge, cancer.
- Nicholas Gillham, 85, American geneticist, heart attack.
- Enrique Guardia, 65, Spanish Olympic water polo player.
- Hasan Celal Güzel, 73, Turkish journalist and politician.
- Arnold R. Hirsch, 69, American historian, Lewy body dementia.
- Irwin Hoffman, 93, American conductor.
- Chaim Samuel Hönig, 92, Brazilian mathematician.
- Jose Kaimlett, 76, Indian Catholic priest, founder of the Heralds of Good News.
- Nicolás Kingman, 99, Ecuadorian journalist, writer and politician.
- Jürg Laederach, 72, Swiss writer.
- Jean Michel Larrasket, 67, French engineer and professor (University of Pau and Pays de l'Adour, Mondragón University).
- Dick LeMay, 79, American baseball player (San Francisco Giants, Chicago Cubs).
- Stanley Lieberson, 84, Canadian-born American sociologist.
- Luo Fu, 89, Taiwanese poet.
- Anil Malnad, 60, Indian film editor (Sitaara, Anveshana), blood clot.
- Aghasi Manukyan, 51, Armenian Olympic wrestler (1996), world champion (1993).
- Keith O'Brien, 80, Scottish Roman Catholic Cardinal, Archbishop of St Andrews and Edinburgh (1985–2013), complications from a fall.
- Les Payne, 76, American journalist (Newsday), Pulitzer Prize (1974).
- Moishe Postone, 75, Canadian Western Marxist historian, philosopher and political economist, cancer.
- Kedarnath Singh, 83, Indian poet.
- Sudan, 45, Kenyan northern white rhinoceros, last known male of his subspecies, euthanized.
- Thunder Gulch, 25, American racehorse, Kentucky Derby winner (1995), euthanized.
- Jacobus Verhoeff, 91, Dutch mathematician.
- Viktor Yerin, 74, Russian military officer, Minister of Internal Affairs (1992–1995).
- Julie Yip-Williams, 42, American lawyer and writer, colon cancer.

=== 20 ===
- Tossi Aaron, American folk singer.
- Dilbar Abdurahmonova, 81, Uzbekistani conductor, violinist and teacher, People's Artist of the USSR (1977).
- Ann-Charlotte Alverfors, 71, Swedish author.
- Frank Avruch, 89, American television host (Bozo the Clown).
- Pat Barr, 83, British novelist.
- Katie Boyle, 91, Italian-born British actress, television personality and game-show panelist.
- Ariel Bybee, 75, American operatic mezzo-soprano.
- João Calvão da Silva, 66, Portuguese politician, MP for Coimbra (1995–1999), Minister of Internal Administration (2015).
- Kak Channthy, 38, Cambodian space rock singer, traffic collision.
- Paul Colin, 97, French novelist.
- Peter "Mars" Cowling, 72, British bassist (Pat Travers Band).
- John Donaldson, 92, American football player (Chicago Hornets, Los Angeles Dons).
- Tom Griffin, 72, American playwright (The Boys Next Door).
- Siringan Gubat, 68, Malaysian politician, MP for Ranau (2004–2008), MLA (1990–2004, 2013–2018), heart attack.
- Ramon Deleon Guerrero, 71, Northern Mariana Islands politician, Senator (2000–2004).
- Gurbaksh Singh Khalsa, 52, Indian Sikh rights activist, suicide by jumping.
- C. K. Mann, 81–82, Ghanaian highlife musician.
- Dylan Mika, 45, New Zealand rugby union player (Samoa national team, New Zealand national team, Auckland), heart attack.
- Bobby Mitchell, 75, American golfer.
- Mike Obrovac, 62, American football player (Toronto Argonauts, Cincinnati Bengals).
- Sergio Peña Clos, 90, Puerto Rican politician, member of the Senate of Puerto Rico (1980–2004).
- Peter G. Peterson, 91, American financier (Lehman Brothers), co-founder of The Blackstone Group, Secretary of Commerce (1972–1973).
- Zoran Popovich, 87, American politician.
- Yuri Shatalov, 72, Russian ice hockey player (Krylya Sovetov Moscow).
- Deo Kumar Singh, 67, Indian Maoist leader and insurgent commander, heart attack.
- William Smith, 89, American wrestler, Olympic champion (1952).
- Ayaz Soomro, 59, Pakistani politician, MNA (since 2013), MPA for Larkana (2002–2013), heart disease.
- Joseph M. Sussman, 78, American engineer.
- Emmett Hulcy Tidd, 94, American military officer.

=== 21 ===
- Roger Anderson, 75, American football player (New York Giants, Montreal Alouettes).
- Anna-Lisa, 84, Norwegian actress (Black Saddle, Have Rocket, Will Travel).
- Kakon Bibi, c. 102, Bangladeshi spy and freedom fighter.
- Gerrit Blaauw, 93, Dutch computer scientist.
- Dejan Bravničar, 80, Slovene violinist.
- Kevin C. A. Burke, 88, British geologist.
- James M. Carew, 85, American politician.
- George H. Emert, 79, American biochemist, President of Utah State University (1992–2000).
- Frank Gaylord, 93, American sculptor.
- Tom Higgins, 73, American rock climber.
- Ulrica Hydman Vallien, 79, Swedish artist, heart attack.
- James C. Irwin, 88, American military officer, Vice Commandant of the U.S. Coast Guard (1986–1988).
- Rolf Leeser, 88, Dutch footballer (Ajax) and fashion designer.
- Larry Miller, 80, American baseball player (New York Mets, Los Angeles Dodgers).
- Elliott Mishler, 93, American social psychologist.
- Paul Edward Plunkett, 82, American federal judge, member of the U.S. District Court for Northern Illinois (1982–1998).
- Eric Manvers Shooter, 93, English scientist.
- John Vogt, 81, American politician, member of the Florida Senate (1972–1988), interstitial fibrosis.
- Peter Waddington, 71, British sociologist and police officer, cardiac arrest.
- Martha Wallner, 90, Austrian actress (The Street).
- Dick Wilmarth, 75, American dog musher, winner of the 1973 Iditarod, cancer.
- Leo C. Zeferetti, 90, American politician, member of the U.S. House of Representatives from New York's 15th congressional district (1975–1983).

=== 22 ===
- Fergus Anckorn, 99, British magician, longest-serving member of The Magic Circle, bladder cancer.
- Michael Barnes, 85, British politician, MP for Brentford and Chiswick (1966–1974).
- Khozh-Akhmed Bersanov, 91, Russian Chechen writer and ethnographer.
- Syd Cheatle, 82, Irish architect and writer.
- Morgan Chua, 68, Singaporean cartoonist.
- Jose Flores, 57, Peruvian-born American jockey, injuries sustained in racing fall.
- Dick Gamble, 89, Canadian hockey player (Montreal Canadiens, Toronto Maple Leafs, Rochester Americans).
- Mel Gordon, 71, American writer, renal failure.
- Paul Green, 94, American electrical engineer.
- James F. Holland, 92, American physician.
- René Houseman, 64, Argentine footballer, tongue cancer.
- Wayne Huizenga, 80, American entrepreneur (Blockbuster) and sports team owner (Miami Dolphins, Florida Panthers), cancer.
- Johan van Hulst, 107, Dutch politician, author and academic, awarded Righteous Among the Nations (1970), member of the Senate (1956–1981) and the European Parliament (1961–1968).
- Jan Kantůrek, 69, Czech translator.
- Nancy Lee Katz, 70, American photographer, cancer.
- Morgana King, 87, American jazz singer and actress (The Godfather), non-Hodgkin's lymphoma.
- Charles Lazarus, 94, American entrepreneur and executive (Toys "R" Us), respiratory failure.
- Lyn Lott, 67, American golfer, complications from brain surgery.
- Carlos Eduardo Miranda, 56, Brazilian musician, record producer and reality television judge (Ídolos, Qual é o Seu Talento?, Esse Artista Sou Eu).
- Morten Piil, 75, Danish film critic.
- Michael J. Reynolds, 78, Canadian actor (Gorillas in the Mist, United 93, Leap Year).
- Dariush Shayegan, 83, Iranian cultural theorist and philosopher, stroke.
- Nicholas Tsoucalas, 91, American judge, member of the Court of International Trade (1986–1996), pneumonia.

=== 23 ===
- Paul L. Anderson, 71, American architect, heart attack.
- Glen Ash, 86, American actor.
- Don Ball, 81, American builder and philanthropist.
- Mike Beedle, 55, American software engineer, stabbed.
- Lino Bortolo Belotti, 87, Italian Roman Catholic prelate, Auxiliary Bishop of Bergamo (1999–2009).
- DuShon Monique Brown, 49, American actress (Chicago Fire, Prison Break, Unexpected), sepsis.
- Ernie Burrington, 91, British newspaper editor and journalist.
- Raymond Butt, 77, British schoolteacher, pancreatic cancer.
- Debbie Lee Carrington, 58, American actress and stuntwoman (Return of the Jedi, Total Recall, Bride of Chucky).
- Philip E. Curran, 90, American politician.
- Douglas Galbraith, 52, Scottish novelist.
- Lawrence K. Grossman, 86, American television executive.
- Robert Hackman, 77, Ghanaian Olympic athlete.
- Hasili, 27, French racehorse.
- Murray S. Hoffman, 93, American cardiologist.
- Philip Kerr, 62, British author (March Violets, Children of the Lamp, A Philosophical Investigation).
- Patricia Ann Lamkin, 55, German-born American playwright.
- Dan Lanphear, 80, American football player (Houston Oilers).
- Jukka Mikkola, 74, Finnish politician, MP (1983–1986, 1995–2003).
- Zell Miller, 86, American politician, Governor of Georgia (1991–1999), member of the U.S. Senate (2000–2005), Parkinson's disease.
- Alberto Ongaro, 92, Italian journalist and writer.
- Jaakko Pakkasvirta, 83, Finnish film director and screenwriter.
- Aileen Paterson, 83, Scottish writer and illustrator.
- Idowu Sofola, 83, Nigerian jurist.
- Ephraim Stern, 84, Israeli archaeologist.
- Delores Taylor, 85, American actress and screenwriter (Billy Jack), complications of dementia.
- Seán Treacy, 94, Irish politician, TD (1961–1997), Ceann Comhairle (1973–1977, 1987–1997).
- John Welchli, 89, American rower, Olympic silver medalist (1956).
- Ralph Woolsey, 104, American cinematographer (The Great Santini, The Iceman Cometh, Oh, God! Book II).

=== 24 ===
- José Antonio Abreu, 78, Venezuelan conductor and politician, founder of El Sistema.
- Arnold Andenmatten, 95, Swiss military patrol skier, winner of the Olympic demonstration event (1948).
- Lys Assia, 94, Swiss singer, winner of the first Eurovision Song Contest (1956).
- Rim Banna, 51, Palestinian singer, composer and activist, breast cancer.
- Arnaud Beltrame, 44, French gendarme, stabbed.
- Jeff Cooper, 82, Canadian actor (Dallas, Circle of Iron, The Born Losers).
- Bernie De Koven, 76, American video game designer (Alien Garden), lung cancer.
- John Ehle, 92, American writer.
- Rudresh Gowda, 62, Indian politician, member of the Lok Sabha from Hassan (1996–1997), Karnataka MLA from Belur, Karnataka (since 2008), heart attack.
- John Hsu, 86, Chinese-born American violist.
- Theodor Kolobow, 87, Estonian-born American physician.
- Hassan Muhammed Lawal, 63, Nigerian politician.
- Bill Lucas, 101, British RAF officer and Olympic long-distance runner (1948).
- Joe Malone, 94, Australian footballer (North Melbourne).
- Chalmers Marquis, 91, American public television and radio advocate.
- Frank Meisler, 89, German-born Israeli architect and sculptor (Kindertransport – The Arrival).
- Hidetoshi Nagasawa, 77, Japanese sculptor and architect.
- Carl Scheib, 91, American baseball player (Philadelphia Athletics, St. Louis Cardinals).
- Marco Solfrini, 60, Italian basketball player, Olympic silver medalist (1980), heart attack.
- Arthur Tafoya, 85, American Roman Catholic prelate, Bishop of Pueblo (1980–2009).
- Mely Tagasa, 82, Filipino actress, stroke.
- Michael Voigt, 59, American sport shooter, handgun world champion (1999), cancer.
- James Wickstrom, 75, American radio host and white supremacist.
- Alvin Wright, 57, American football player (Los Angeles Rams).

=== 25 ===
- Bob Biderman, 77–78, British-American novelist. (death announced on this date)
- André Bourbeau, 81, Canadian politician, MNA for Laporte (1981–2003), Mayor of Saint-Lambert, Quebec (1978–1981), cancer.
- Jules-Aristide Bourdes-Ogouliguende, 80, Gabonese politician, Speaker of the National Assembly (1990–1993).
- Linda Carol Brown, 75, American equality campaigner, involved in Brown v. Board of Education.
- Edwin Carr, 89, Australian Olympic sprinter (1952), dual Commonwealth champion (1950).
- David Cobham, 87, British film director (Tarka the Otter), stroke.
- Clell D. Elwood, 93, American politician.
- Anton Jože Gale, 73, Slovenian Olympic ice hockey player (1964, 1968, 1972).
- Mike Harrison, 72, British singer (Spooky Tooth).
- Desmond Lewis, 72, Jamaican cricketer (West Indies).
- Vicente Ramón Hernández Peña, 82, Venezuelan Roman Catholic prelate, Bishop of Trujillo (1982–2012).
- Mel Rosen, 90, American track and field coach (Auburn Tigers).
- Seo Min-woo, 33, South Korean singer (100%).
- Bruce Sumner, 93, American politician.
- Antonia Syson, 45, British-American classical scholar, inflammatory breast cancer.
- Nicolae Tilihoi, 61, Romanian footballer (Universitatea Craiova).
- Dagfinn Vårvik, 93, Norwegian politician, leader of the Centre Party (1973–1977), Minister of Finance (1963–1963) and Foreign Affairs (1972–1973).
- Olle Widestrand, 85, Swedish musician and composer.
- Jerry Williams, 75, Swedish singer, cancer.

=== 26 ===
- Fouad al-Zayat, 77, Syrian businessman, cancer.
- Patricia Burton, 85, American baseball player (Fort Wayne Daisies).
- Bernie Collins, 82, Canadian politician.
- Sándor Demján, 74, Hungarian entrepreneur (TriGranit).
- Mamadou Diop, 81, Senegalese politician, Mayor of Dakar (1984–2002).
- António dos Santos, 85, Portuguese Roman Catholic prelate, Bishop of Guarda (1979–2005).
- Sir John Grimley Evans, 81, British gerontologist.
- Fabrizio Frizzi, 60, Italian television presenter (L'eredità), cerebral hemorrhage.
- Nikolay Kaufman, 92, Bulgarian musicologist, folklorist and composer.
- Merle Masonholder, 74, American college football coach.
- Sergei Mavrodi, 62, Russian financial fraudster, member of State Duma (1994–1995), heart attack.
- William Plant, 73, Jamaican Olympic sailor.
- Probosutedjo, 87, Indonesian businessman, thyroid cancer.
- Fernand Steenacker, 87, Belgian Olympic rower (1956).
- Zeke Upshaw, 26, American basketball player (Grand Rapids Drive), hypertrophic cardiomyopathy.
- Sir Michael Wheeler-Booth, 84, British public servant, Clerk of the Parliaments (1991–1997).

=== 27 ===
- Stéphane Audran, 85, French actress (The Discreet Charm of the Bourgeoisie, Babette's Feast, The Big Red One).
- Benjamin Bassin, 74, Finnish diplomat.
- Jane Smisor Bastien, 82, American educator and piano teacher.
- Ferd Burket, 85, American football player (Saskatchewan Roughriders, Montreal Alouettes).
- Chan Sui-kau, 91, Hong Kong industrialist and philanthropist.
- Douglas Everett, 90, Canadian politician.
- Carlos Cruz González, 87, Spanish comics artist.
- José Hugo Garaycoa Hawkins, 87, Peruvian Roman Catholic prelate, Bishop of Tacna y Moquegua (1991–2006).
- Frank Hodgetts, 93, English footballer (West Bromwich Albion, Millwall).
- David Humm, 65, American football player (Oakland Raiders, Baltimore Colts), complications from multiple sclerosis.
- Aimée Iacobescu, 71, Romanian actress (The Doom), breast cancer.
- Luc Jalabert, 66, French rejoneador.
- Victor Kalashnikov, 75, Russian gun designer (PP-19 Bizon).
- Tom Martin, 69, American politician, Mayor of Lubbock, Texas (2008–2012).
- Sir Eric McClintock, 99, Australian businessman and public servant, chairman of Woolworths Limited (1980–1987).
- Jerry Moses, 71, American baseball player (Boston Red Sox, Detroit Tigers).
- Bert Nievera, 81, Filipino-American singer.
- Kenny O'Dell, 73, American country singer-songwriter ("Behind Closed Doors", "Mama He's Crazy"), Grammy winner (1974).
- James "Quick" Parker, 60, American-Canadian football player (BC Lions, Edmonton Eskimos).
- Rosendo Rodriguez, 38, American convicted rapist and murderer, execution by lethal injection.
- Archie Sibeko, 90, South African anti-apartheid activist.
- Richard Felix Staar, 95, Polish-born American political scientist and historian.
- Louise A. Tilly, 87, American historian.
- Robert Hugh Willoughby, 96, American flautist.

=== 28 ===
- Oleg Anofriyev, 87, Russian actor, singer, songwriter, film director and poet.
- Armand Arabian, 83, American jurist, Supreme Court of California (1990–1996).
- Kateryna Boloshkevich, 78, Ukrainian weaver and statesperson.
- Bobby Ferguson, 80, English football player (Derby County) and manager (Ipswich Town).
- Wolfgang Girardi, 89, Austrian Olympic gymnast.
- Livia Ruth Gollancz, 97, English horn player.
- Travis Hill, 48, American football player (Cleveland Browns).
- Walter E. Johnston III, 82, American politician.
- Peter Munk, 90, Hungarian-born Canadian mine owner (Barrick Gold) and philanthropist (Toronto General Hospital).
- Stanisław Paździor, 73, Polish footballer
- Clarence Pettersen, 65, Canadian politician, member of the Legislative Assembly of Manitoba (2011–2016).
- William Prochnau, 80, American journalist, coronary artery disease.
- Catherine Pym, 96, Australian Olympic fencer (1952).
- Lívia Rév, 101, Hungarian pianist.
- Eugène Van Roosbroeck, 89, Belgian racing cyclist, Olympic champion (1948).
- Clément Rosset, 78, French philosopher and writer.
- Caleb Scofield, 39, American rock bassist and singer (Cave In, Zozobra, Old Man Gloom), traffic collision.
- Daryl Thomas, 52, American basketball player (Indiana Hoosiers), heart attack.
- Mike Tucker, 73, British equestrian rider and commentator.
- Eric Unger, 91, Canadian ice hockey player.
- Norm Wilson, 83, New Zealand cricketer (Northern Districts).
- Vincent Zarrilli, 85, American businessman and activist.

=== 29 ===
- David Bartov, 94, Polish-born Israeli judge.
- R. J. Berry, 83, British geneticist and theistic evolutionist, stroke.
- Dexter Bristol, 57, Grenadian immigrant to the United Kingdom.
- Jim Callaghan, 91, British politician, MP for Middleton and Prestwich (1974–1983) and Heywood and Middleton (1983–1997).
- Don Colpoys, 83, American baseball coach and manager (Buffalo Bisons).
- Corrado dal Fabbro, 72, Italian bobsledder, Olympic silver medalist (1972).
- Geoffrey Dodsworth, 89, British banker and politician, MP for South West Hertfordshire (1974–1979).
- Ginette Durand, 88, French Olympic gymnast.
- Sir William Gladstone, 7th Baronet, 92, British aristocrat and Chief Scout (1972–1982).
- Colin Harper, 71, English footballer (Ipswich Town).
- Lew Holder, 94, American football player (Los Angeles Dons).
- Ron Mailer, 85, Scottish footballer (Dunfermline Athletic).
- Emiliano Mondonico, 71, Italian football manager (Torino, Atalanta, Fiorentina), stomach cancer.
- Walter Pérez Villamonte, 81, Bolivian Roman Catholic prelate, Bishop of Potosí (1998–2009).
- Pollyanna Pickering, 75, British wildlife artist.
- Stephen Reinhardt, 87, American judge, U.S. Court of Appeals for the Ninth Circuit (since 1980), heart attack.
- Ed Samcoff, 93, American baseball player (Philadelphia Athletics).
- Mohamed Shaker, 84, Egyptian diplomat, member of Board of Governors of the International Atomic Energy Agency (1986–1998) and Ambassador to the UK (1988–1997).
- Anita Shreve, 71, American author (The Pilot's Wife, The Weight of Water, Stella Bain), cancer.
- Sven-Olov Sjödelius, 84, Swedish canoer, Olympic champion (1960, 1964).
- Rusty Staub, 73, American baseball player (New York Mets, Montreal Expos, Detroit Tigers), multiple organ failure.
- Enrique Troncoso Troncoso, 80, Chilean Roman Catholic prelate, Bishop of Iquique (1989–2000) and Melipilla (2000–2014).
- Paul Van Arsdale, 97, American hammered dulcimer player.
- Jimmy Woods, 83, American saxophonist.

=== 30 ===
- Alias, 41, American rapper, producer and record label founder (Anticon), heart attack.
- Patrick Atiyah, 87, English legal scholar.
- Robert James Baker, 75, American mammalogist.
- Samuel Belzberg, 89, Canadian financier, complications from a stroke.
- Aureliano Bolognesi, 87, Italian boxer, Olympic champion (1952).
- Sharon Brehm, 72, American psychologist, Chancellor of Indiana University Bloomington (2001–2003), complications from Alzheimer's disease.
- Ivan Čaklec, 85, Croatian Olympic gymnast.
- Anna Chennault, 92, Chinese-born American journalist and businesswoman.
- Saul Cherniack, 101, Canadian politician, Manitoba Minister of Finance (1969–1972, 1973–1975).
- Saunders Davies, 80, British Anglican prelate, Bishop of Bangor (2000–2004).
- Geri Evans, 77, American politician.
- Josie Farrington, Baroness Farrington of Ribbleton, 77, British politician, life peer (since 1994).
- Jack Gray, 91, Canadian football player (Toronto Argonauts).
- Ivor Forbes Guest, 97, British historian and writer.
- Philip Gulliver, 96, British-born Canadian anthropologist.
- Drue Heinz, 103, American literary publisher (The Paris Review) and patron (Drue Heinz Literature Prize).
- Henry Theophilus Howaniec, 87, American Roman Catholic prelate, Bishop of Most Holy Trinity in Almaty (1999–2011).
- Rod Johnston, 80, American politician.
- Daisy Kadibil, 95, Australian Aboriginal woman, inspiration for the film Rabbit Proof Fence, dementia.
- Sabahudin Kurt, 82, Bosnian folk and pop singer ("Život je sklopio krug").
- André Bo-Boliko Lokonga, 83, Congolese politician, Speaker of the National Assembly (1970–1979) and Prime Minister (1979–1980).
- Bill Maynard, 89, English actor (Heartbeat, Confessions of a Window Cleaner, Carry On), complications from a fall.
- Nacho Pérez Frías, 62, Spanish footballer (CD Málaga) and sports physician, complications of burns.
- Alexander Pylcyn, 94, Russian military officer.
- Wolfgang Schilling, 62, German football player (Arminia Bielefeld, Tennis Borussia Berlin) and manager (Berliner AK 07).
- Marcel Storme, 87, Belgian legal scholar and politician.
- Michael Tree, 84, American violist.
- Jean-Guy Trépanier, 86, Canadian politician.
- La Wilson, 93, American artist, stroke.
- Allen Wood, 77, Welsh footballer (Newport County).
- Stephanie Yellowhair, 41, American transgender activist.

=== 31 ===
- Frank Aendenboom, 76, Belgian actor.
- Margarita Carrera, 88, Guatemalan philosopher, professor and writer.
- Michael Cooper, 87, American historian.
- Luigi De Filippo, 87, Italian actor (Non è vero... ma ci credo, You're on Your Own, Love Italian Style).
- Chris Edwards, 41, British boxer, heart attack.
- John Mack Flanagan, 71, American disc jockey (KFRC), heart failure.
- Charles Goodwin, 74, American linguistic anthropologist and semiotician, cancer.
- Ted J. Land, 81, American politician, member of the Georgia State Senate (1979–1990).
- Peg Lautenschlager, 62, American attorney and politician, Attorney General of Wisconsin (2003–2007), member of the Wisconsin State Assembly (1989–1993), breast cancer.
- Ray Marinko, 82, Australian rules footballer (West Perth).
- James McAlister, 66, American football player (Philadelphia Eagles), cancer.
- James C. Sanders, 91, American businessman and politician.
- Jan Snoeck, 91, Dutch sculptor.
- Leonard D. Wexler, 93, American judge (U.S. District Court for the Eastern District of New York).
