= Bidgood =

Bidgood is a surname. Notable people with the surname include:

Luke Bidgood (1992-) scape artist

- Harry Bidgood (1898–1957), English composer, dance band leader and musical director for films
- Jack Bidgood (1902–1975), Australian rules footballer
- James Bidgood (politician) (born 1959), Australian politician, member of the House of Representatives for the seat of Dawson, in north Queensland
- James Bidgood (filmmaker) (1933–2022), American contemporary artist living and working in New York City
- John Bidgood (1914–2001), British Conservative Party politician
- Ruth Bidgood (1922–2022), Welsh poet
- Sally Bidgood (1948–2018), British botanist
- Thomas Bidgood (1858–1925), English composer and conductor

== See also ==
- The Adventure of Faustus Bidgood, surreal Canadian comedy film, released in 1986
