= Ken Wallace =

Ken or Kenneth Wallace may refer to:

- Ken Wallace (canoeist) (born 1983), Australian sprint canoeist
- Ken Wallace (cricketer) (born 1936), English cricketer
- Ken Wallace (footballer) (born 1952), English footballer
- Ken M. Wallace (1944–2018), British mechanical engineer
- Kenny Wallace (born 1963), American stock car racing driver
