= Raymond Wilkins =

Raymond Wilkins may refer to:

- Ray Wilkins (1956–2018), English footballer
- Ray Wilkins (footballer, born 1928) (1928–2018), English footballer
- Ray Wilkins (Scary Movie), a character in Scary Movie and Scary Movie 2, portrayed by Shawn Wayans
- Raymond H. Wilkins (1917–1943, US Air Force officer, posthumously awarded the Medal of Honor
- Raymond Wilkins (actor), appeared in Veritas, Prince of Truth
- Raymond Wilkins (rugby) (born 1950), Welsh rugby union and rugby league footballer
- Raymond Sanger Wilkins (1891–1971), chief justice of the Massachusetts Supreme Judicial Court
