= Joseph Israel =

Joseph Israel may refer to:

- Joseph Israel (naval officer)
- Joseph Israel (musician)
