= Rosewarne (surname) =

Rosewarne is a surname. Notable people with the surname include:

- Dan Rosewarne (born 1981), New Zealand politician
- Harold Rosewarne (1930–2018), Australian rules footballer
- Keith Rosewarne (1924–2008), Australian rules footballer
- Ken Rosewarne (1911–1987), Australian rules footballer
