= Arranz =

Arranz is a surname. Notable people with the surname include:

- Asier Arranz (born 1987), Spanish footballer
- Dolores Herrera Arranz (born 1935), Spanish actress
- Eduardo Arranz-Bravo (born 1941), Spanish painter
- José Arranz (1930–2018), Spanish priest
- Mario Arranz (born 1978), Spanish rower
- Melecio Arranz (1888–1966), Filipino politician
- Paloma Arranz (born 1969), Spanish handball player

== See also ==
- Arranz-Bravo Foundation, Art museum and gallery in L’Hospitalet de Llobregat, Catalonia
