= Syson =

Syson is a surname. Notable people with the surname include:

- Antonia Syson (1973–2018), British-American classical scholar specialising in the study of Virgil's Aeneid
- Alfred Syson (1880–1952), British fencer who competed in the 1912 Summer Olympics
- Lucinda Syson, nominee for the 2006 Artios Award for Outstanding Achievement in Casting – Big Budget Feature (Drama)
- Luke Syson (fl. 1990s–2020s), director of the Fitzwilliam Museum
- Sidney Syson, winner in the 2019 Warwick District Council election
