= Vladimir Gerasimov =

Vladimir Gerasimov may refer to:

- Vladimir Gerasimov (footballer, born 1975), Russian football coach and former player
- Vladimir Gerasimov (footballer, born 1989) (1989–2018), Russian footballer
- Vladimir Ivanovich Gerasimov, Hero of the Soviet Union
- Vladimir Gerasimov (general) (1931–2021), Russian army officer
