= Adam Ostrowski =

Adam Ostrowski may refer to:

- O.S.T.R. (Adam Ostrowski, born 1980), Polish rapper
- Adam Ostrowski (wrestler) (1945–2022), Polish Olympic wrestler
- Adam Ostrowski (RAF officer) (1919–2018), Polish RAF pilot
