= Surat Singh Khalsa =

Indian civil rights and political activist (1933–2025)

Bapu Surat Singh Khalsa
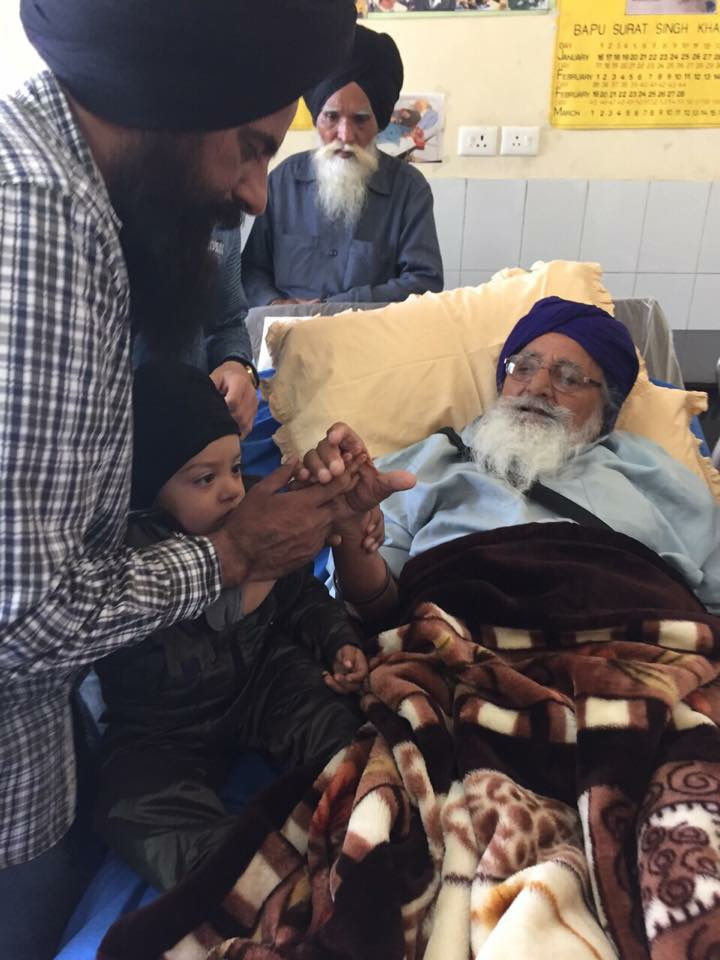
- Khalsa in 2015
- Born: 7 March 1933; Hassanpur, Ludhiana district, Punjab Province, British India
- Died: 14 January 2025 (aged 91)
- Occupations: Civil rights and political activist
- Known for: Hunger strike against detention of political prisoners
- Parent(s): Sardar Santokh Singh (father); Bibi Prem Kaur(mother)

Surat Singh Khalsa (7 March 1933 – 14 January 2025), also known as Bapu Surat Singh Khalsa, was a civil rights and political activist from the Indian state of Punjab. Surat Singh Khalsa was involved with various political struggles related to Sikhs in Punjab, however, he was in the mid-2010s in the limelight for a hunger strike as a form of peaceful protest against illegal and prolonged detention of political prisoners.

== Hunger strike ==
On 16 January 2015, Khalsa began a hunger strike. He refused food and water to seek the release of Sikh political prisoners who have completed their court sentences. He also called for the unconditional release of prisoners of all religions who have completed their terms.

On 11 February 2015, Surat Singh Khalsa wrote an open letter to Prime Minister Narendra Modi explaining the motive of his hunger strike. In his letter, Surat Singh Khalsa summed up his demands in two points:

1. Treat all Sikh prisoners – under trials and those sentenced in cases relating to the Sikh struggle – as political prisoners.
2. Release all prisoners who have completed their full jail terms and are legitimately due for release, exactly in the same manner, as other prisoners are released in various other parts of the country.

A number of Sikh political prisoners are languishing in jails despite having completed their sentences. Many of these prisoners are released on parole on a yearly basis. These prisoners can be granted permanent parole or be released on bail as there are no pending charges against them. In addition, Surat Singh Khalsa was seeking the release of senior citizens based on humanitarian grounds. There are at least 8 such prisoners who have been sentenced under the Terrorist and Disruptive Activities (Prevention) Act for their involvement in a bank robbery case that took place in Ludhiana. This law has already lapsed. It has been deemed as controversial by human rights organizations, as well as the United Nations.

On 5 December 2015, a viral video began circulating showing a man purported to be Khalsa eating in a hospital setting. Khalsa rejected this report, claiming it was ploy to distract from his strike, and gave up drinking water in further protest. However, during an interview given to the Indian Express, his son accepted that he did consume that food, although due to the drugs the doctors had given him.

== Formal detentions ==
On 26 February 2015, Surat Singh Khalsa and his son, Ravinder Jeet Singh, a US citizen, were arrested in Ludhiana, Punjab (India) under "preventive charges". At time of his arrest, Surat Singh Khalsa was peacefully protesting for release of Sikh political prisoners who have completed their terms. His son, Ravinder Jeet was merely accompanying his father at a hospital in Ludhiana (Punjab, India) when they were both arrested. In addition, Surinder Singh of Talking Punjab and others were also detained for brief periods. After intervention of the President of India and alleged pressure by various US Congressmen, Surat Singh Khalsa and Ravinder Jeet Singh were released.

Before his formal detention, Surat Singh Khalsa was picked up from his residence in Hassanpur on 8 February 2015, where he had commenced his hunger strike. His arrest was informal, without any charges. He was taken to the Civil Hospital in Ludhiana. Until 26 February 2015, family members and supporters continued to visit him, however later the police turned the informal detention to a virtual arrest, turning the hospital into a police station.

After being released on 23 April 2015, he was once again picked up on 1 June and detained at the Ludhiana's DMC Hero Heart Hospital for 18 days. On 18 June, he was transferred to Chandigarh's PGI Hospital and kept there until 22 June when he was released and allowed to return to his Hassanpur residence.

Again, on 20 July, he was taken into custody at Ludhiana's Civil Hospital on 20 July, and kept there for 3 days to be later transferred to the DMC Hero Heart Hospital once again on 22 July until 15 August, for 12 days.

== Political activism ==
Surat Singh Khalsa was involved with human rights activism since the early 1970s. During the Dharam Yudh Morcha (a political movement launched by the Sikhs for equal rights) of 1980's, he served as an adviser.

He resigned his post as government teacher on 5 June 1984 in the aftermath of Operation Bluestar in June 1984. Continuing with his advocacy for human rights, he served as the secretary of the United Akali Dal (UAD), where he remained active until late 1987. During a protest rally at Punjab Legislative Assembly in February 1986, his leg was allegedly hit by a bullet. He continued to remain politically active, which resulted in him being detained in various jails during the 1980s.

In 1988, Khalsa moved to the United States to live with his children. At the time of his death, both Surat Singh Khalsa and his children were US citizens. After migrating to the US, Khalsa kept visiting Punjab on a regular basis.

After Amb Sahib Morcha of November 2013 and Lakhnaur Sahib campaign in November 2014, Surat Singh Khalsa decided to stand up for those detained unconstitutionally. During the first campaign for the release of Sikh political prisoners, Surat Singh Khalsa had announced that if anything was to happen to Bhai Gurbaksh Singh Khalsa, he would personally under indefinite fast-onto-death until Sikh political prisoners were released. When Bhai Gurbaksh Singh commenced his 2nd hunger strike, Surat Singh Khalsa traveled to Punjab from USA to express his support. However, after the conclusion of the second hunger strike as well by Bhai Gurbaksh Singh, Surat Singh Khalsa announced to undergo hunger strike in place of Bhai Gurbaksh Singh.

== Anna Hazare's anti-corruption agitation ==
In the first Anna Hazare anti-corruption agitation in New Delhi, when Hazare was on hunger strike fast from 5 to 9 April 2011, Surat Singh Khalsa also remained on fast in Ludhiana in support of the anti-corruption drive. The Tribune, labelled Surat Singh Khalsa as the "Anna Hazare of Punjab".

== Death ==
Khalsa died on 14 January 2025, at the age of 91.
