= Agustín Almodóbar Barceló =

Spanish politician (born 1977)

Member of the Senate
- Incumbent
- Assumed office 17 August 2023
- Constituency: Alicante
- In office 23 October 2008 – 27 February 2019
- Preceded by: Miguel Barceló Pérez
- Constituency: Alicante

Member of the Congress of Deputies
- In office 21 May 2019 – 30 May 2023
- Constituency: Alicante

Personal details
- Born: 1 December 1977 (age 48)
- Party: People's Party
- Parent: Ángela María Barceló Martorell (mother)
- Relatives: Miguel Barceló Pérez (grandfather); Eduardo Zaplana (uncle)

Agustín Almodóbar Barceló (born 1 December 1977) is a Spanish politician. He has been a member of the Senate since 2023, having previously served from 2008 to 2019. From 2019 to 2023, he was a member of the Congress of Deputies.
