= Zoran Popovich =

American judge (1931–2018)

Judge of the Pennsylvania Superior Court
- In office 1980–2010

Judge of the Court of Common Pleas of Allegheny County
- In office 1973–1980

Personal details
- Born: February 4, 1931 Akron, Ohio, U.S.
- Died: March 20, 2018 (aged 87)
- Education: University of Pittsburgh (BA, LLB)

Zoran Popovich (February 4, 1931 – March 20, 2018) was a Pennsylvania politician and lawyer who served as mayor of McKeesport and judge on the Pennsylvania Superior Court. Popovich was appointed to the court in 1980, and was then elected to a full ten-year term in 1985 and again in 1995.

He served until his retirement in 2001 and remained a part-time judge until 2010.

== Formative years ==
Born in Akron, Ohio on February 4, 1931, Popovich served in the United States Air Force from 1951 to 1953. He received a Bachelor of Arts from the University of Pittsburgh in 1954, and a Bachelor of Laws from the University of Pittsburgh Law School in 1957.

== Career ==
Popovich served on the McKeesport, Pennsylvania, city council from 1967 to 1969, and was mayor of McKeesport from 1969 to 1973.

Popovich was elected to the Court of Common Pleas of Allegheny County, 1973.

== Death ==
Popovich died on March 20, 2018. He was eighty-seven years old.

== Notes ==
- Material on this page was initially imported from the Judgepedia article on Zoran Popovich, and has been expressly released under the GFDL per Judgepedia:Copyrights..
