= John Mack Flanagan =

American radio DJ (1946–2018)

John Mack Flanagan (November 15, 1946 – March 31, 2018) was a Top 40 radio DJ, and a member of the Broadcast Legends, the Bay Area Radio Hall of Fame, and the National Disk Jockey Hall of Fame. Flanagan was born in Concordia, Kansas and moved to Roswell, New Mexico as a teenager. It was in Roswell that he first signed on to the radio, as an on-air host for the country music station KRSY. After a tour of duty as a radio broadcaster in Vietnam, Flanagan joined the air staff of San Francisco Top 40 powerhouse KFRC ("The Big 610"), where his mid-day program followed that of Dr. Don Rose. After leaving KFRC, he recorded commercials and voice-overs in a home studio before returning to live radio with KABL-FM, and finally retired from radio in 2000. In 2015 he published the autobiography, Tight & Bright: A Discjockey Vietnam Memoir.
