= Werner Radspieler =

German Roman Catholic bishop (1939–2018)

Werner Radspieler (13 August 1938 – 7 March 2018) was a Roman Catholic bishop.

Radspieler was ordained to the priesthood in 1964. He served as titular bishop of 'Thugga' and as auxiliary bishop of the Roman Catholic Archdiocese of Bamberg from 1986 until 2013.
