= Jack Bidgood =

Australian rules footballer, born 1902

Personal information
- Full name: John Arnold Bidgood
- Born: 30 May 1902; Mornington, Victoria
- Died: 9 September 1975 (aged 73); Mornington, Victoria
- Original team: Mornington

Playing career^{1}
Years	Club	Games (Goals)
1925	St Kilda	1 (0)
- ^{1} Playing statistics correct to the end of 1925.

John Arnold Bidgood (30 May 1902 – 9 September 1975) was an Australian rules footballer who played with St Kilda in the Victorian Football League (VFL).

== Family ==
The son of George Bidgood (1861-1936), and Margaret Bidgood (1865-1940), née Patterson, John Arnold Bidgood was born at Mornington, Victoria on 30 May 1902.

He married Ethel Gibson (1902-1992) in 1928.

== Football ==
=== Mornington (PFA) ===
He played for the Mornington Football Club in the Peninsula Football Association from, at least, 1920, until, at least, 1927.

He was part of Mornington's 1922 and 1927 Premiership teams.

=== St Kilda ===
Granted a permit to play with St Kilda on 29 April 1925, he played (on the wing) in his single game with the St Kilda First XVIII, against Hawthorn, at the Junction Oval, on 9 May 1925.
