= Karen Saywitz =

American psychologist

Prof Saywitz

Karen Jill Saywitz (1956 – March 17, 2018) was an American psychologist, author, and educator. She worked as a developmental and clinical psychologist and professor at the UCLA School of Medicine and Department of Psychiatry and Development. For more than 20 years, Saywitz taught child development and was director of several mental health programs for families. She also developed "non-leading" techniques for interviewing child witnesses and victims, based on cognitive and developmental psychology principles. She died of cancer in 2018.

== Education ==
Saywitz earned her Master of Science degree at the University of Wisconsin. She earned her doctorate in clinical and developmental psychology from the University of Illinois at Chicago in 1984. She attended a postdoctoral fellowship at the University of California, Los Angeles (UCLA), where she eventually rose from assistant professor to full professor; she was also director of child and adolescent psychology at the Harbor-UCLA Medical Center.

== Career ==
In the 1980s, when few researchers were studying the topic, Saywitz specialized in child maltreatment and trauma, with particular focus on child forensic interviewing. Saywitz received national and international attention in the academic community for her research on child abuse, children's mental health, and children's ability to serve as witnesses. Amicus briefs she co-authored have been cited by the U.S. Supreme Court and the California Supreme Court as well as numerous U.S. appellate courts.

Saywitz co-authored the 2014 book Evidence-based Child Forensic Interviewing: The Developmental Narrative Elaboration Interview, published by Oxford University Press, which provides guidelines for interviewing child witnesses and victims.

Saywitz founded the Inter-divisional Task Force on Child and Adolescent Mental Health of the American Psychological Association (APA), and was elected a fellow of the APA in 2009.

Saywitz founded, co-founded, directed, and served with programs dedicated to improving the lives of children. These programs include TIES for Adoption, the National Judicial College, California Professional Society on the Abuse of Children, Div. 37's Section on Child Maltreatment and the Inter-divisional Task Force on Child and Adolescent Mental Health. She was a former president of the American Psychological Association's Division of Child, Youth, and Family Services and was president of its Section on Child Maltreatment.

== Awards ==
- Outstanding Contributions to the Science of Trauma Psychology (American Psychological Association, Division 56) (2018)
- Nicholas Hobbs Award for Research and Child Advocacy (American Psychological Association, Division 37) (2006)
- Mark Chaffin Outstanding Research Career Achievement Award from the American Professional Society on the Abuse of Children (2003)
- Child Abuse Professional of the Year Award from the California Consortium to Prevent Child Abuse
- Distinguished Service Award from the California Professional Society on the Abuse of Children

== Selected works ==
- Saywitz, K. J., & Camparo, L. B. (2014). Evidence-based Child Forensic Interviewing : The Developmental Narrative Elaboration Interview. Oxford: Oxford University Press.
- Saywitz, K. J., Goodman, G. S., & Lyon, T. D. (2002). Interviewing children in and out of court: Current research and practice implications. In J. E. B. Myers, L. Berliner, J. Briere, C. T. Hendrix, C. Jenny, & T. A. Reid (Eds.), The APSAC handbook on child maltreatment., 2nd ed. (pp. 349–377). Thousand Oaks, CA: Sage Publications, Inc.
- Saywitz, Karen J.; Larson, Rakel P.; Hobbs, Sue D.; Wells, Christine R. (2015). "Developing Rapport with Children in Forensic Interviews: Systematic Review of Experimental Research". Behavioral Sciences & the Law. 33 (4): 372–389. doi:10.1002/bsl.2186. PMID 26206588.
- Saywitz, Karen J.; Wells, Christine R.; Larson, Rakel P.; Hobbs, Sue D. (2019). "Effects of Interviewer Support on Children's Memory and Suggestibility: Systematic Review and Meta-Analyses of Experimental Research". Trauma, Violence, & Abuse. 20 (1): 22–39. doi:10.1177/1524838016683457. PMID 30803408. S2CID 73461235.
- Nathanson, Rebecca; Saywitz, Karen J. (2015). "Preparing Children for Court: Effects of a Model Court Education Program on Children's Anticipatory Anxiety". Behavioral Sciences & the Law. 33 (4): 459–475. doi:10.1002/bsl.2191. PMID 26294383.
