= La Wilson =

- Born: Mary Alice Purcell; May 26, 1926; Corning, New York
- Died: March 30, 2018 (aged 91); Hudson, Ohio
- Known for: Assemblage art

La Wilson (May 26, 1926 – March 30, 2018) was an American artist known for her box sculptures. Working in the tradition of assemblage art, she created pieces using ordinary, found objects such as dominoes, blocks, and crayons.

== Personal life ==
Wilson was born Mary Alice Purcell to Justin and Alice Purcell in Corning, New York. Her older brother Tom had trouble pronouncing her name; hence the name "La."

Wilson attended Smith College before dropping out and marrying David Wilson. David worked as a lawyer, and La was a homemaker who took care of their three children. Their marriage ended in divorce.

In 1946, the family moved to Hudson. Shortly after, she began taking weekly painting classes at the Akron Art Institute (now Akron Art Museum). It was during the class that she began working with found objects, adding them directly to her canvases.

== Career ==
Wilson's work was first shown in 1959 at the Akron Art Institute, as part of their 36th annual May Show. She participated in four more of the Institute's annual juried exhibitions. Her first solo show was at Ross Widen Gallery in Cleveland, Ohio in 1967.

In the 1980s, Wilson began to gain national recognition. She partnered with John Davis, an Akron art collector, in 1983. Three years later, her work showed in New York for the first time at his gallery in Hudson. Wilson continued to work with Davis throughout her life.

Opening on her 90th birthday, the Akron Art Museum hosted a retrospective of Wilson's work in 2014.

== Death ==
Wilson died on March 30, 2018, at her home in Hudson. According to her daughter, the death was likely caused by complications from recent strokes.
