= Dale F. Rudd =

- Born: 1935; Minneapolis, Minnesota, U.S.
- Died: 2 March 2018 (aged 82)
- Education: University of Minnesota
- Known for: Chemical Reaction Engineering, Process systems engineering
- Awards: National Academy of Engineering (1978), Guggenheim Fellowship (1970)
- Scientific career
- Fields: Chemical Engineering
- Workplaces: University of Michigan; University of Wisconsin
- Doctoral advisor: Neal Amundson

Dale F. Rudd (1935–2018) was an American Chemical Engineer and Donald C. Slichter Professor Emeritus of Engineering Research at the University of Wisconsin–Madison. He is known for his influential work in process engineering, in particular for introducing computer aided process synthesis design strategies for large scale chemical industries. He co-wrote the first textbook in process engineering, and was elected to the National Academy of Engineering in 1978.

== Early life ==
Rudd was born in 1935 in Minneapolis, Minnesota, and received his BS in 1956 and his Ph.D. in 1959 in Chemical Engineering under Neal Amundson from the University of Minnesota. He was an assistant professor at the University of Michigan in Ann Arbor before joining the Chemical and Biological Engineering department at University of Wisconsin–Madison in 1961.

== Professor at Wisconsin ==
At the University of Wisconsin he developed the field of process synthesis in computerized process design. Process synthesis is used to design processes that can be used in commercial chemical plants. The significance is it uses computer algorithms to determine the chemical processes, reducing the costly need to test chemicals in full-scale production. Rudd's strategies have been used in areas such as waste treatment, chemical production and food processing. University of California Provost C. Judson King called Rudd's work “truly pioneering and important”.

Rudd co-wrote with Charles C. Watson "Strategy of Process Engineering" (1968, John Wiley & Sons; Spanish Edition 1976), the first textbook in the field. His other textbooks include "Process Synthesis" with Gary Powers and Jeffrey Siirola (1974 Prentice-Hall), "Strategy of Pollution Control" with P. Mac Berthouex (1977, Wiley; Russian Edition 1980, Chinese Edition 1985), "Petrochemical Technology Assessment" with Fathi-Afshar, Trevino and Stadtherr (1981, Wiley), "Impact of Future Catalytic Developments on the Chemical Industry" with Dumesic and Trevino (1985, Catalytica Associates) and "The Microkinetics of Heterogeneous Catalysis" with Dumesic, Aparicio, Rekoske and Trevino (1993, American Chemical Society). He was on the editorial boards of John Wiley & Sons, International Chemical Engineering and AIChE Journal, and founded the engineering company Shanahan Valley Associates.

== Honors ==
Rudd's awards include a Guggenheim Fellowship in 1970, an Outstanding Educator in America in 1975, election to the National Academy of Engineering in 1978 and election to the founding class of the Washington State Academy of Sciences in 2008.
