= Paul Colin (writer) =

French novelist

Paul Colin (French pronunciation: [pɔl kɔlɛ̃]; 15 May 1920 – 20 March 2018) was a French novelist who received the Prix Goncourt in 1950 for Les jeux sauvages. Colin died in March 2018 at the age of 98.

== Works ==
- Les jeux sauvages, Éditions Gallimard, Paris, 1950. Translated into English as Savage Play, Dutton, New York, 1953
- Terre paradis, Gallimard, 1959
