= Louise Gray Young =

Astronomer and researcher

- Born: Louise Dillon; October 4, 1935
- Died: March 2, 2018 (aged 82)
- Education: UCLA, California Institute of Technology
- Scientific career
- Workplaces: University of Texas, Texas A&M University, Jet Propulsion Lab

Louise Gray Young (October 4, 1935 - March 2, 2018) was an American astronomer and researcher who specialised in molecular spectroscopy. She is best known for her spectroscopic analysis of the planetary atmospheres of Earth, Venus and Mars.

== Early life and education ==
Louise Dillon was born October 4, 1935, in Los Angeles, California, to Ruth Davis and Frank Dillon. She studied at the University of California, Los Angeles, graduating with Bachelor (1958) and Master (1959) degrees in engineering. She was awarded her Ph.D. in engineering science at California Institute of Technology. Her thesis was in the emission and transfer of radiation in gases under the direction of Stanford S. Penner.

== Research and career ==
In 1965, Young started working at the engineering faculty at University of California, Los Angeles. In 1967, she became a research associate in astronomy at the University of Texas at Austin. Young then went on to work at NASA's Jet Propulsion Lab until 1974. After which, Young became a research scientist at Texas A&M University.

In 1976, Young became a fellow of the Optical Society of America. She was also a member of the American Astronomical Society, International Astronomical Union, and American Meteorological Society. Between 1969 and 1977, Young was an associate editor of the Journal of Quantitative Spectroscopy and Radiative Transfer.

== Selected publications ==
- Gray, L.D.; Young, A.T. (May 1969). "Relative intensity calculations for carbon dioxide—IV". Journal of Quantitative Spectroscopy and Radiative Transfer. 9 (5): 569–589. doi:10.1016/0022-4073(69)90008-9.
- R Schorn; L Gray Young; E Barker. (May 1970). "High-dispersion spectroscopic observations of Venus". Icarus. 12(3). 391–401. doi: 10.1016/0019-1035(70)90007-2
- L Gray Young. (August 1971). "Calculation of the partition function for 14N216O". Journal of Quantitative Spectroscopy and Radiative Transfer. 11(8). 1265–1270. doi:10.1016/0022-4073(71)90099-9
- L Gray Young. (November 1970). "Effective Pressure for Line Formation in the Atmosphere of Venus". Icarus. 13(3). 449–458. doi:10.1016/0019-1035(70)90092-8
- L Gray Young. (July 1971). "Interpretation of high resolution spectra of Mars—II calculations of CO2 abundance, rotational temperature and surface pressure". Journal of Quantitative Spectroscopy and Radiative Transfer. 11(7). doi:10.1016/0022-4073(71)90127-0

== Personal life ==
Louise Gray Young was married to Andrew T. Young. She had two children, Gregory and Elizabeth. She died aged 82 in San Diego, California on March 2, 2018.
