= Luciano Faraguti =

Italian politician (1937–2018)

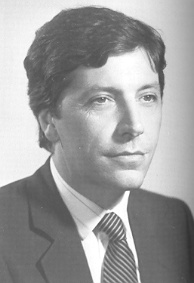
Luciano Faraguti

Luciano Faraguti (26 August 1937 – 11 March 2018) was an Italian politician.

He was born in La Spezia on 26 August 1937. Faraguti was a member of the Regional Council of Liguria from 1975 to 1979. He then served in the Chamber of Deputies until 1994. Between 1983 and 1987, he served as undersecretary of tourism. Faraguti died at a hospital in Genoa on 11 March 2018.
