= Clell D. Elwood =

American politician

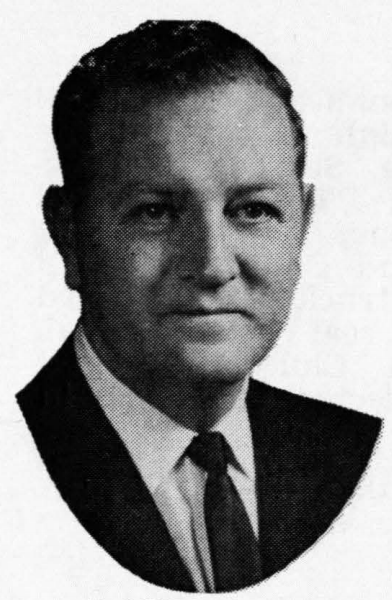

Member of the South Dakota House of Representatives for the 44th district
- In office November 1963 – March 1967

Member of the South Dakota Senate for the 26th district
- In office 1967–1968

Personal details
- Born: August 9, 1924 Creighton, Nebraska, U.S.
- Died: March 25, 2018 (aged 93)
- Party: Republican
- Spouse: Beverly Rasband
- Children: three
- Profession: businessman, insurance agent

Clell D. Elwood (August 9, 1924 – March 25, 2018) was an American politician in the state of South Dakota. He was a member of the South Dakota House of Representatives and South Dakota Senate. He was an alumnus of the College of Idaho and was a businessman owning an insurance company, as well as an insurance agent.
