= Marian Schmidt =

Polish photographer (1945–2018)

- Born: 1945; Żyrardów
- Died: 7 March 2018 (aged 72–73); Kraków
- Occupation: artist photographer
- Website: http://www.wsfoto.art.pl/

Marian Schmidt (born in 1945 in Żyrardów, died on 7 March 2018 in Kraków) – Polish artist photographer. Member of Warsaw District of Polish Union of Artist Photographers (Związek Polskich Artystów Fotografików). Co-founder of Warsaw School of Photography and Graphic Design.

== Biography ==
Marian Schmidt was born in Żyrardów shortly before the end of World War II. In 1946 - together with his family - he migrated to France and later to Venezuela - where he spent his childhood and attended high school. Later he graduated from University of California, Berkeley, and gained his PhD degree in mathematics from Brandeis University. In 1974, he returned to Poland, where he worked for the magazines: Kino, ITD, Perspektywy, Szpilki, Teatr, Zwierciadło. In 1975 he worked as assistant to Polish film director Jerzy Kawalerowicz, as part of the film team Kadr. In the late 1970s he worked for some foreign photographic agencies: Black Star in New York, USA and Rapho in Paris. In 1980 he moved to Paris, and later - by mid-1990s - again to Poland. For numerous years he served as director and lecturer at the Warsaw School of Photography and Graphic Design and also as lecturer at the University of Fine Arts in Poznań and National Film School in Łódź - where in 2002 he received post-doctoral degree (habilitation) in artistic photography.

Marian Schmidt died on 7 March 2018 in Kraków. On 12 March he was buried at the Warsaw Jewish Cemetery at Okopowa street.

== Art ==
Schmidt photographed since 1957. He was an author and co-author of numerous photographic exhibitions of individual and collective artists. His own photographies were presented in numerous places in the World such as New York, London, Paris, Tokyo, Zurich, but also in Poland: Kraków, Gdańsk, Poznań, Szczecin, Warszawa and also in his city of birth: Żyrardów. Special place in his art work was dedicated to humanistic photography, portrait as metaphore in a landscape. In 1995 he was accepted as member of the Warsaw District group of Polish Union of Artist Photographers (membership ID number 706).

His art works - photografies are in the collections of Bibliotheque National in Paris, Bibliotheques de l'Histoire Contemporainne in Paris, Musee de la Photographie in Charleroi (Belgium), Museum Folkwang in Essen (Germany) and in National Museum in Gdańsk, Poland.

== Publications (albums) ==
His publications are the following:

- Hommes de science: 28 portraits (Paryż 1990)
- Marian Schmidt (Paryż 1994)
- Niecodzienne rozmowy z ks. Janem Twardowskim (Warszawa 2000)

== Bibliography ==
- Leksykon kultury polskiej poza krajem od roku 1939 - Krzysztof Dybciak, Zdzisław Kudelski; Towarzystwo Naukowe Katolickiego Uniwersytetu Lubelskiego ISBN 83-87703-18-4
- Zdjęcia polskiego fotografa z czasów PRL zachwycają na całym świecie. Teraz możesz je zobaczyć w Polsce.
- Założyciel Warszawskiej Szkoły Fotografii i Grafiki Projektowej dr hab Marian Schmidt.
