= John Furlow =

American football player and coach (1929–2018)

Biographical details
- Born: August 18, 1929; South Philadelphia, Pennsylvania, U.S.
- Died: March 17, 2018 (aged 88); Fenwick Island, Delaware, U.S.

Playing career

Football
- 1947–1950: West Chester

Coaching career (HC unless noted)

Football
- 1961–1971: West Chester (assistant)
- 1972–1978: West Chester

Club boxing
- 1977–1990: West Chester

Head coaching record
- Overall: 36–33 (football)

Accomplishments and honors

Championships
- 3 PSAC East Division (1972–1974)

John J. Furrow Sr. (August 18, 1929 – March 17, 2018) was an American college football player and coach. He served as the head football coach at West Chester University of West Chester, Pennsylvania from 1972 to 1978, compiling a record of 36–33.

== Head coaching record ==
=== College ===
Year	Team	Overall	Conference	Standing	Bowl/playoffs
West Chester Golden Rams (Pennsylvania State Athletic Conference) (1972–1976)
1972	West Chester	7–3	5–0	1st (East)	
1973	West Chester	5–5	4–0	1st (East)	
1974	West Chester	8–2	5–0	1st (East)	
1975	West Chester	4–5	3–2	3rd (East)	
1976	West Chester	5–4	4–1	2nd (East)	
West Chester Golden Rams (NCAA Division II independent) (1977–1978)
1977	West Chester	5–5			
1978	West Chester	2–9			
West Chester:		36–33	21–3		
Total:		36–33			
National championship Conference title Conference division title or championship game berth
