= Alexander Pylcyn =

Soviet Battalion Commander

Alexander Vasilevich Pylcyn
- Александр Васильевич Пыльцын
- Born: 18 November 1923
- Died: 30 March 2018 (aged 94)
- Military career
- Allegiance: Soviet Union
- Branch: Red Army
- Rank: Lieutenant
- Unit: 8th Independent Penal Battalion
- Awards: Order of the Red Banner; Order of the Patriotic War; Order of the Red Star

Alexander Vasilevich Pylcyn (Russian: Александр Васильевич Пыльцын; 18 November 1923 – 30 March 2018) was a Soviet Battalion Commander during the Great Patriotic War. Pylcyn commanded the 8th Independent Penal Battalion. During his service in the Soviet Army, he was awarded the Order of the Red Banner and the Order of the Red Star, both highly recognized medals in the former Soviet Union.

== 8th Independent Penal Battalion ==
The 8th Independent Penal Battalion was part of the 11th Guards Army. It was made up largely of disgraced soldiers and officers, dangerous prisoners of war, and political enemies, brought from throughout the Soviet Union to join the Battalion. The disgraced soldiers usually came from the front line. If a Company Commissar observed soldiers making defeatist comments, or willingly surrendering territory, he could either mark them up for a summary execution, or, force them to join a Penal Battalion. Although the soldier got a second chance at life, sometimes being in a Penal Battalion was a fate worse than death. The prisoners of war were mostly German prisoners captured by the Soviets. Many of these prisoners had lost the will to fight, and were bullied into Penal Battalions by Soviet generals and commissars. The few political prisoners that came into the Battalion were from the Gulag in Siberia. The Battalion favoured fighting in difficult terrain areas.

== The Great Patriotic War ==
Pylcyn began his military career at 18 years old in 1941 when he volunteered to join the army. He fought in many minor battles throughout 1943 and was offered to command the 8ya Otdyelnaya Shtrafnoy Batalon—the 8th Independent Penal Battalion—which he accepted. The newly formed penal battalion then began to fight its first battles on the Eastern Front, commanded by Pylcyn.

The Battalion's first major operation was the summer offensive of Operation Bagration in 1944. The operation went badly for the Battalion; it is estimated that over 80% of Pylcyn's men died during the operation. The penal battalions were usually the first to be thrown into the front line. During the offensive the Battalion probed through marshes, barbed wire defenses, and minefields. Pylcyn marked a safe path through the minefield with white flags. The Battalion would advance through quiet parts of the line, searching for weak points in the German defenses. The Battalion eventually came across a German fortification full of German infantry and assaulted the fortification. It was here that 80% of the men lost their lives. The Battalion did still manage to take the fortification, however, Pylcyn was badly wounded.

Pylcyn was transported to a Soviet field hospital. While being treated in the hospital, he met a young nurse who would eventually become his wife. Her name was Rita Makarievskaya. The two were married before the war ended. When Pylcyn was discharged, he and Rita rejoined the Battalion, with Rita acting as the Battalion nurse. Rita saved many lives in the Vistula-Oder operation. Pylcyn's last battle was the final assault on Berlin. Alexander Pylcyn and Rita Makarievskaya were married in the last months of the war. Pylcyn survived the Great Patriotic War. After the war, Pylcyn wrote a book about his war experience called; Penalty Strike. As of 2018, he lived in St. Petersburg, Russia. He died on 30 March 2018 at the age of 94.
