= Rinus van Beek =

Dutch swimmer (1947–2018)

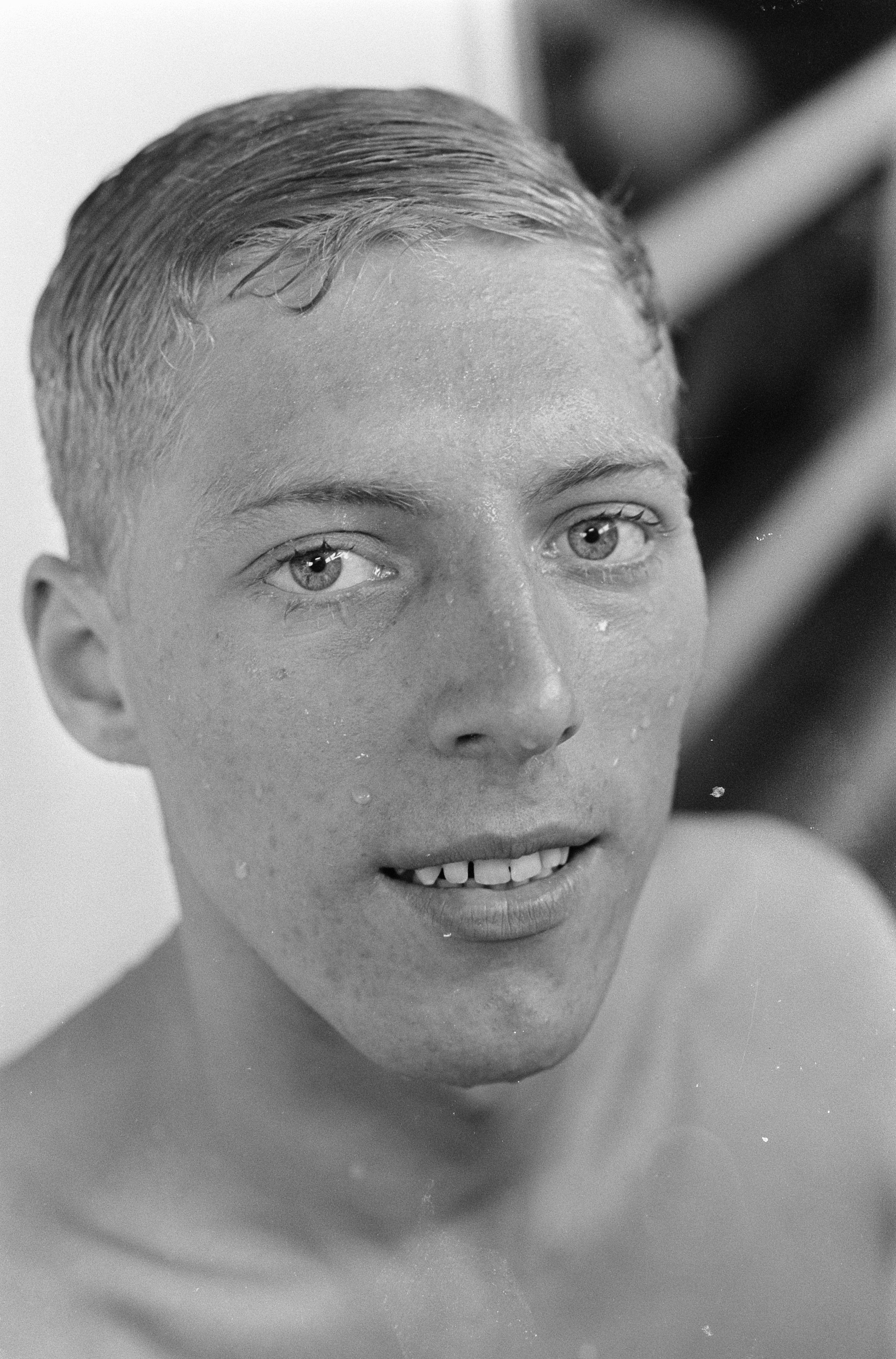
- Rinus van Beek in 1967

Personal information
- Born: 18 July 1947 (age 78) Amsterdam, Netherlands
- Died: 7 March 2018 (aged 70) Amsterdam, Netherlands
- Height: 1.93 m (6 ft 4 in)
- Weight: 86 kg (190 lb)

Sport
- Sport: Swimming
- Club: Het Y, Amsterdam

Marinus Cornelis "Rinus" van Beek (18 July 1947 – 7 March 2018) was a Dutch swimmer. He competed at the 1968 Summer Olympics in the 200 m backstroke event, but failed to reach the final. After his career he became an architect.
