= Nancy Lee Katz =

American photographer (1947–2018)

- Born: June 12, 1947
- Died: March 22, 2018 (aged 70)
- Occupation: Photographer

Nancy Lee Katz (June 12, 1947 – March 22, 2018) was an American photographer. Katz "dedicated a period of 25 years to a private project of photographing people, mainly in the arts, whose work she respected. She kept the pictures to herself, never offering them for sale, or for exhibit, or for publication."

The Museum of Fine Arts, Houston holds seventy-two of her photographs, including her portraits of Richard Serra, Robert Rauschenberg, Ravi Shankar, Maya Lin, Martin Puryear and Louise Bourgeois. Her work is also included in the collections of the Art Institute of Chicago, the Museum of Fine Arts Boston, the National Library of France, RISD Museum.,Albertina Museum,Library of Congress,Nelson-Atkins Museum of Art,National Gallery of Art, Royal Collection Trust,George Eastman Museum, Harvard Art Museums.Minneapolis Institute of Art Yale University Art Gallery Princeton University Art Museum Tokyo Photographic Art Museum National Gallery of Victoria Amon Carter Museum of American Art and Victoria and Albert Museum.

Malcolm Daniel, Curator of Photography at Museum of Fine Arts Houston, has written a short essay on Katz and Nadar.

Katz’s photographs have appeared in the 2022 exhibition FACES at the Albertina Moderne in Vienna, in the 2021/2022 Barbara Kruger exhibition at the Art Institute of Chicago, at the 2011 exhibition Brancusi/Serra at Guggenheim Museum Bilbao and Fondation Beyeler, and at the 2023-2024 exhibitions Personas and Artists on Artists at the Jewish Museum (New York).

Photographic portraits by Nancy Lee Katz have been published in books and exhibition catalogues, among which: Constantin Brancusi and Richard Serra: A Handbook of Possibilities (front cover), Richard Serra: Writings/Interviews (front cover), Alex Katz Cool Paintings (page 215) Ruth Bader Ginsburg - Justice, Justice Thou Shalt Pursue (page 10 of photograph section), Abakanowicz konfrontacje (page 4), American Muse - The Life and Times of William Schuman (page 318).
