= Miguel Barceló Pérez =

Spanish politician

MP Miguel Barceló Pérez

Senator for Alicante
- In office 22 June 1986 – 12 March 2018

Personal details
- Born: 28 December 1923; Benidorm, Spain
- Died: 12 March 2018 (aged 94); Benidorm
- Political party: Alianza Popular; Partido Popular
- Relatives: Eduardo Zaplana (son-in-law); Agustín Almodóbar Barceló (grandson)
- Occupation: Politician

Miguel Barceló Pérez (28 December 1923 – 12 March 2018), was a Spanish politician who was Senator for Alicante and Eduardo Zaplana's father-in-law.

As a child he lived with his family in Barcelona, but during the Spanish Civil War they returned to Benidorm. After the war he studied in Madrid, and when he returned to Benidorm he worked as an entrepreneur in farm management and director of tourism companies. At the same time, his brother Jaime was mayor of Benidorm from 1969 to 1971.

During the 1977 Spanish general elections, he managed UCD in Benidorm. When the collapse of this party took place, he chose the mayoralty of Benidorm to the Spanish municipal elections of 1983 as head of list of the Liberal Democratic Party, but he wasn't chosen. He retired from this party to appear as head of the list of Popular Alliance to the Spanish municipal elections of 1987.

Simultaneously was chosen senator by the province of Alicante to the Spanish general elections of 1986, 1989, 1993, 1996, 2000, 2004, 2008, 2011 and 2015. Within the Senate has been second secretary (1988–1989) and first vice president (2000–2004) of the commission of relations with the Ombudsman and Human Rights (1988-1989 and 2000–2004), president of the Special Commission on Genetic Manipulation for the Purpose of Food Production (1999–2000), second vice-president of the Commission Mixed for the Study of the Problem of Drugs (1996–1999) of the Spanish Senate. He was replaced on the bench by his grandson Agustín Almodóbar Barceló after his death on 12 March 2018
