= Enrique Guardia =

Spanish water polo player (1952–2018)

Personal information
- Nationality: Spanish
- Born: 11 May 1952; Barcelona, Spain
- Died: 19 March 2018 (aged 65)

Sport
- Sport: Water polo

Enrique Guardia (11 May 1952 – 19 March 2018) was a Spanish water polo player. He competed in the men's tournament at the 1972 Summer Olympics.
