= Joseph M. Sussman =

American engineer

Joseph Martin Sussman (November 17, 1939 Brooklyn, New York– March 20, 2018 Boston, Massachusetts) was an American engineer who was the JR East Professor the Department of Civil and Environmental Engineering and the Institute of Data, Systems and Society at Massachusetts Institute of Technology. From 1980 to 1985, he served as Head of the Department of Civil Engineering at MIT. In 2007, he was elected fellow of the American Association for the Advancement of Science.
