= Graziella Mascia =

Italian politician (1953–2018)

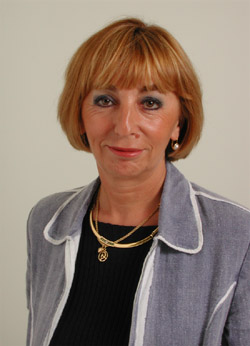
Graziella Mascia

Graziella Mascia (4 September 1953 – 11 March 2018) was an Italian politician.

Born in Magenta, Lombardy, she joined the Italian Communist Party in 1972 and served on its central committee from 1979 to 1983. She became of a member of the Communist Refoundation Party in 1991, and was elected to the Chamber of Deputies between 2001 and 2008. She died on 11 March 2018, aged 64, in Robecco sul Naviglio.
