= Kong Bai Ji =

Chinese artist (1932–2018)

- 孔柏基
- Born: 24 March 1932; Shanghai, China
- Died: 12 March 2018 (aged 85); Connecticut, United States
- Occupation: Artist
- Known for: Painting

Kong Bai Ji or Kong Boji (Chinese: 孔柏基; pinyin: Kǒng Bǎijī; (March 24, 1932 – March 12, 2018) was a Chinese artist who was born in Shanghai in 1932. His works are included in the permanent collections of many of the world's leading museums and cultural institutions, including The Art Institute of Chicago, Lincoln Center in New York, The National Art Museum of China, in Beijing, The Shanghai Art Museum, Harvard University, Smith College Museum of Art, The Soyanzi Art Museum in Tokyo, The Peace Museum in Hokkaido, Japan, and the Kimpusen-ji temple in Nara, Japan. Kong's paintings were also on display in a special exhibit in the China Pavilion at Expo 2010 in Shanghai.

In 1987, Kong's work was included in the first North American showing of contemporary Chinese art after the Cultural Revolution, an exhibition which took place at the USC Pacific Asia Museum. Henry Kissinger wrote the foreword of the catalog for this exhibition.

In 2007, the Art Institute of Chicago acquired an oil-on-rice-paper painting by Kong entitled "It's Spring Again".

On November 16, 2009, U.S. President Barack Obama and Secretary of State Hillary Clinton met with Shanghai's mayor Han Zheng in front of Kong's large mural at the Xijiao State Guest House in Shanghai.

During a 2011 exhibition at the University of Pennsylvania entitled "Post-Mao Dreaming: Chinese Contemporary Art", noted authorities on Chinese contemporary art Joan Lebold Cohen and Ethan Cohen discussed a painting of Buddha that Kong painted in the 1970s while visiting the Mogao Caves in Dunhuang in China's Gansu province. Joan Lebold Cohen commented, "I felt of the artists I saw, which were many, who had gone to Dunhuang, none ever captured the spirit of Buddha as well as Kong Bai Ji."

The National Art Museum of China held a one-man exhibition in April 2012 to showcase 100 of Kong's paintings. Twenty paintings from the show have become part of the museum's permanent collection. The event served as a retrospective of the work that Kong, who turned eighty in March 2012, produced during the prior sixty years of his life.

In June 2012, China Central Television (CCTV) aired a two-part documentary on Kong that aired globally on CCTV4.

Kong began painting at age five. His first one-man show took place in 1964 at the Shanghai Arts Hall. In 1976, Kong was appointed head of the Department of Fine Arts at the Shanghai Academy. He emigrated to the United States with his family in 1986.

He died on March 12, 2018, in Connecticut, where he had lived for the prior 28 years.
