= Gurbaksh Singh Khalsa =

Indian Sikh civil rights activist (born 1965)

- Born: Gurbaksh Singh; 12 December 1965; Kurukshetra, Haryana, India
- Died: 20 March 2018 (aged 52); Kurukshetra, Haryana, India
- Citizenship: India
- Spouse: Jasbir Kaur (since 1987)
- Children: 1
- Parent(s): Ajit Singh and Mohinder Kaur

Gurbaksh Singh Khalsa was an Indian Sikh civil rights activist, demanding the release of Sikh prisoners from various jails in India.

== Early life ==
Khalsa was born on 12 December 1965, in Kurukshetra, Haryana to father Ajit Singh and mother Mohinder Kaur. He took primary and Sikh religious education from the Gurdwara Lakhnaur Sahib and was also baptized there. In 1987, he married Jasbir Kaur and had a son.

== Campaign ==
In November 2013, Khalsa went on a 44-day hunger strike. The campaign was ended after Giani Gurbachan Singh (Akal Thakat Jathedar), said to take up the issue with the State Government. After none of the detained Sikhs was released, Bhai Gurbaksh Singh Khalsa restarted his hunger strike, one year after his 2013 hunger strike. Over the course of the campaign, he got support from various other Sikh bodies. A number of Punjabi singers, actors and other artists visited him and pledged their support for his campaign.

His second campaign started on 14 November 2014 at Lakhnaur Gurdwara, Harayana. On 8 January Khalsa, who had entered day 56, had proposed to visit Akal Takht - the highest temporal seat of Sikhs, however, a police blockade just a short distance from the Gurdwara prevented him fulfilling his wishes.

Details of the list of prisoners and discussion on the various options available to the Punjab government in case it wants to extend some relief to prisoners are detailed in the Tribune newspaper of India on 11 Jan.

On 10 January (Day 58) he developed breathing difficulties and was taken by authorities to hospital. Khalsa continued his hunger strike whilst in hospital. Gurpiar Singh sat on hunger strike in the absence of Khalsa at Lakhnaur Gurdwara.

Khalsa ended his 2nd hunger strike after 64 days on 15 January.

== Death ==
Khalsa died on 20 March 2018 by jumping off a water tank at Thaska Ali, Kurukshetra. He killed himself seeking the release of seven Sikh prisoners, including the ones convicted for the assassination of Beant Singh in 1995.

== See also ==
- Darshan Singh Pheruman, an eminent Akali leader who in 1969 had observed the hunger strike but died on the 74th day of his fast as he was observing to press for amalgamation of Punjabi-speaking areas of neighbouring states with Punjab.
- Bapu Surat Singh Khalsa, is sitting on fast unto death for over 38 days seeking the release of those Sikh detainees who have completed their legal jail term.
- Vikram Singh Dhanaula, a youth activist who had hurled a shoe at Punjab chief minister Badal on Independence Day, had campaigned for the 1984 Sikh genocide victims and sought punishment for the culprits. His hunger strike ended after the newly elected Delhi Government gave a written assurance to form SIT for 1984 Sikh Genocide cases.
