= Ken Wallace (cricketer) =

English cricketer (born 1936)

Personal information
- Full name: Kenneth William Wallace
- Born: 27 August 1936 (age 90); Romford, Essex, England
- Batting: Right-handed
- Bowling: Right-arm medium

Domestic team information
- Years: Team
- 1967–1972: Essex

Career statistics
Competition	First-class	List A
Matches	10	2
Runs scored	219	26
Batting average	13.68	13.00
100s/50s	–/1	–/–
Top score	55	25
Balls bowled	–	–
Wickets	–	–
Bowling average	–	–
5 wickets in innings	–	–
10 wickets in match	–	–
Best bowling	–	–
Catches/stumpings	2/–	–/–
- Source: Cricinfo, 25 October 2011

Kenneth William Wallace (born 27 August 1936) is a former English cricketer. Wallace was a right-handed batsman who bowled right-arm medium pace. He was born at Romford, Essex.

Wallace made his first-class debut for Essex against Lancashire in the 1967 County Championship. He made nine further first-class appearances for the county, the last of which came against Leicestershire in the 1972 County Championship. In his ten first-class appearances, he scored 219 runs at a batting average of 13.68, with a high score of 55. This score, which was his only first-class fifty, came against Hampshire in 1967. He also made two List A appearances for Essex, one in the 1970 John Player League against Sussex and another in the 1972 Gillette Cup against Kent.
