= Enzo Lippolis =

Italian archaeologist

- Born: 1 July 1956; Mottola, Italy
- Died: 3 March 2018 (aged 61); Milan, Italy
- Education: University of Naples
- Occupation: Classical archaeologist
- Employer: University of Rome "La Sapienza"

Enzo Lippolis (1 July 1956, in Mottola, Italy – 3 March 2018, Metropolitan City of Milan, Italy) was a prominent Italian archaeologist.

Lippolis received his undergraduate training at the University of Perugia (1978) and post-graduate training at the University of Naples (Ph.D. in Archaeology 1987). Lippolis served as the Director of the National Archaeological Museum in Taranto from 1989 to 1995, the Director of the Etruscan National Museum in Marzabotto from 1995 to 2000. From 2012 until his death, he was the director of the Classical archaeology department of the University of Rome "La Sapienza".

Lippolis was a prolific scholar. Included in his oeuvre are key works dealing with Greek colonies in southern Italy, including the sites of Salpia Vetus, and Taranto.

Lippolis died suddenly after an appearance on a program of the Italian television network Rai-3.
