= Peter Davies (Australian cricketer) =

Australian cricketer (1957–2018)

Personal information
- Born: 18 August 1957; Melbourne, Australia
- Died: 10 March 2018 (aged 60)

Domestic team information
- Years: Team
- 1981-1983: Victoria
- Source: Cricinfo, 6 December 2015

Peter Davies (18 August 1957 – 10 March 2018) was an Australian cricketer. He played six first-class cricket matches for Victoria between 1981 and 1983.

== See also ==
- List of Victoria first-class cricketers
