= Mohamed Sayah =

Tunisian politician (1933–2018)

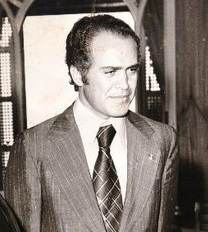
Mohamed Sayah, 1975

Mohamed Sayah (Arabic: محمد الصيّاح; 31 December 1933 – 15 March 2018) was a Tunisian politician who held a number of ministerial roles in the 1960s, 1970s, and 1980s.

== Career ==
Mohamed Sayah held several ministerial portfolios under President Habib Bourguiba.

- Ministry of Information (7 November 1969 to 12 June 1970).
- Department of Public Works (29 October 1971 to 5 June 1973).
- Ministry of Youth and Sports (5 June to 30 November 1973).
- Ministry delegated to the Prime Minister (30 November 1973 to 25 April 1980).
- Ministry of Housing (25 April 1980 to 25 November 1983).
- Ministry of Equipment (25 April 1984 to 16 May 1987).
- Ministry of Education (16 May to 7 November 1987).

Very close to President Bourguiba, he withdrew from political life after rise of Zine El Abidine Ben Ali to power. In 2013, he created the Bourguiba Foundation, an association dedicated to the person and the work of the first president of the Tunisian Republic.

== Publications ==
- Le Néo-Destour face à la troisième épreuve, 1952-1956, tome I « L'échec de la répression », ed. Dar El Amal, Tunis, 1979
- Le Néo-Destour face à la troisième épreuve, 1952-1956, tome II « La victoire », ed. Dar El Amal, Tunis, 1979
- Le Néo-Destour face à la troisième épreuve, 1952-1956, tome III « L'indépendance », ed. Dar El Amal, Tunis, 1979
- Le Nouvel État aux prises avec le complot yousséfiste, 1956-1958, ed. Dar El Amal, Tunis, 1982
- La République délivrée de l'occupation étrangère, ed. Dar El Amal, Tunis, 1984
- (ar) L'Acteur et le témoin, ed. Cérès, Tunis, 2012
