= George Rawitscher =

American physicist and professor

George H. Rawitscher (27 February 1928 – 10 March 2018) was an American physicist who taught at the University of Connecticut.

Rawitscher in his research focused on scattering problems which involve non-local optical models, reaction mechanisms involving break-up and virtual nuclear excitations, the (e,e’p) reaction. He also worked on numerical methods such as Galerkin method and spectral expansions for solving integral equations

Rawitcher was an Elected Fellow of the American Physical Society.
