= Lee Ann Fujii =

American political scientist, author, and professor

Lee Ann Fujii (3 January 1962 - 2 March 2018) was an American political scientist, author, and professor at the University of Toronto.

Born in Seattle to American parents of Japanese descent, who had met when they were interned during World War II, her family’s history gave her first-hand experiences in the world of political violence, and her research on the subject of violence, race, and ethnicity are held in high esteem within the academic community. Fujii graduated from Reed College in Portland, Oregon with a BA in Music, and then worked in the acting and tech industry in San Francisco before pursuing her master's degree. She graduated with an MA in International Relations from San Francisco State University in 2001, with a thesis on the Rwandan Genocide. She earned her PhD in political science from George Washington University.

Fuji studied complex, multi-layered cases of political violence, especially the genocide in Rwanda. She wrote articles about the diffusion of a genocidal norm, as well as the power of local ties for political participation. Her first published book analyzed why some people participated in mass killings and others did not. Her careful ethnographic interpretive approach provide examples for how political scientists can interpret testimonies of war and violence and reflect upon research ethics while conducting fieldwork.

Before her sudden death, Fujii was working on another book, Show Time: The Logic and Power of Violent Display. Other scholars of political violence helped publish the work, and wrote about her contributions to the study of genocides, civil wars, and political violence.
