= Merle Masonholder =

American football and wrestling coach (1943–2018)

Biographical details
- Born: December 16, 1943; Davenport, Iowa, U.S.
- Died: March 26, 2018 (aged 74); Fayette, Missouri, U.S.

Playing career

Football
- 1962–1965: State College of Iowa
- Position: Tackle

Coaching career (HC unless noted)

Football
- 1966–1968: Iowa Valley HS (IA)
- 1971–1977: Cornell (IA) (assistant)
- 1978–1979: Morningside (DC)
- 1980–1981: Carroll (WI) (assistant)
- 1982–2000: Carroll (WI)
- 2001–2007: Central Methodist

Wrestling
- 1966–1969: Iowa Valley HS (IA)
- 1969–1971: Coe
- 1971–1977: Cornell (IA)

Head coaching record
- Overall: 108–142 (college football)

Accomplishments and honors

Championships
- Football; 1 CCIW (1988); 4 MWC North Division (1992–1993, 1995, 1997)

Awards
- Football; CCIW Coach of the Year (1988)

Ross Merle Masonholder (December 16, 1943 – March 26, 2018) was an American football and wrestling coach. He served as the head football coach at Carroll College—now known as Carroll University—in Waukesha, Wisconsin from 1982 to 2000 and Central Methodist University in Fayette, Missouri from 2001 to 2007, compiling a career college football head coaching record of 108–142. Masonholder was also the head wrestling coach at Coe College in Cedar Rapids, Iowa from 1969 to 1971 and Cornell College in Mount Vernon, Iowa from 1971 to 1977.

== Playing career ==
Masonholder played college football at the State College of Iowa—now known as the University of Northern Iowa—where he was a two-time first team "All-Conference" tackle and received honorable mention as an All-American athlete.

== Coaching career ==
=== Early coaching career ===
Masonholder began his coaching career in 1966 at Iowa Valley High School in Marengo, Iowa, where he was head football and head wrestling coach for three years. In 1969, he was hired as head wrestling coach at Coe College in Cedar Rapids, Iowa. In 1971, Masonholder moved on to Cornell College in Mount Vernon, Iowa as head wrestling coach.

=== Carroll ===
Masonholder was the 26th head football coach at Carroll College—now known as Carroll University—in Waukesha, Wisconsin, serving for 19 seasons, from 1982 to 2000. His coaching record at Carroll was 88–87.

=== Central Methodist ===
Masonholder became the head football coach at Central Methodist University in Fayette, Missouri in 2001, serving until the conclusion of the 2007 season. While at CMU, he oversaw many positive changes in the football program and athletic department.

== Head coaching record ==
=== College football ===
Year	Team	Overall	Conference	Standing	Bowl/playoffs
Carroll Pioneers (College Conference of Illinois and Wisconsin) (1982–1991)
1982	Carroll	0–9	0–8	9th	
1983	Carroll	0–8	0–8	9th	
1984	Carroll	2–7	2–6	T–6th	
1985	Carroll	3–6	2–6	T–6th	
1986	Carroll	2–7	2–6	8th	
1987	Carroll	5–4	5–3	T–3rd	
1988	Carroll	7–2	7–1	T–1st	
1989	Carroll	6–3	6–2	3rd	
1990	Carroll	6–3	5–3	4th	
1991	Carroll	5–4	4–4	5th	
Carroll Pioneers (Midwest Conference) (1992–2000)
1992	Carroll	8–1	4–1	T–1st (North)	
1993	Carroll	7–3	4–1	1st (North)	
1994	Carroll	6–3	3–2	3rd (North)	
1995	Carroll	6–3	4–1	T–1st (North)	
1996	Carroll	6–3	3–2	3rd (North)	
1997	Carroll	5–5	4–1	T–1st (North)	
1998	Carroll	4–6	3–6	7th	
1999	Carroll	5–5	4–5	5th	
2000	Carroll	5–5	5–4	T–3rd	
Carroll:		88–87	67–70		
Central Methodist Eagles (Heart of America Athletic Conference) (2001–2007)
2001	Central Methodist	1–10	0–10	11th	
2002	Central Methodist	5–6	4–6	T–6th	
2003	Central Methodist	2–8	2–8	T–10th	
2004	Central Methodist	4–7	3–7	9th	
2005	Central Methodist	3–8	3–7	T–8th	
2006	Central Methodist	3–8	2–8	T–10th	
2007	Central Methodist	2–8	2–8	9th	
Central Methodist:		20–55	16–54		
Total:		108–142			
National championship Conference title Conference division title or championship game berth
