= Pollyanna Pickering =

British artist and environmentalist (1942–2018)

Pollyanna Pickering (30 July 1942 – 29 March 2018) was an English wildlife artist and environmentalist.

== Biography ==
Pollyanna Pickering was born in Leeds, Yorkshire and was a wildlife artist who went on many expeditions around the world to study animals in their natural habitats. She studied at Rotherham Art School and later at the Central School of Art and Design in London. In 2008 The University of Derby conferred the honorary degree of master of the university.

During a career spanning 50 years her original artwork was exhibited in galleries internationally, including the Tryon Gallery London and The Arizona-Sonora Desert Museum Tucson Arizona. She was signed to publishers Millwheel Prints (1970 – 1980) Drayco (1982 – 1990) and Otter House Ltd (1990 – present) who continue to publish cards, calendars and giftware which sells in eighty countries worldwide. In 2008 the Documentary about her artwork Made in England was broadcast on BBC1.

She won numerous awards including the AFC Simon Combes Conservation award (2012) which recognises conservation through artistic excellence, and held the role of Patron of The Wildlife Art Society International.

In 2000 she established The Pollyanna Pickering Foundation to raise funds and campaign for conservation and animal welfare worldwide.

She was active with many wildlife charities acting as Patron of The Badger Trust and The Born Free Foundation among many others.

She was married to Industrial designer Ken Pickering (1936 – 1978) and has one daughter Anna-Louise. Anna-Louise continues as President of the Pollyanna Pickering Foundation.

Pickering died on 29 March 2018 in Sheffield, England, at the age of 75.
