= Arnold Burden =

Canadian physician

Robert "Arnold" Burden ONS MD CM (April 22, 1922 – March 17, 2018) was a Canadian physician.

Born in Springhill, Nova Scotia, Burden graduated high school from Cumberland County Academy in Amherst. He enrolled in the Royal Canadian Army Medical Corps during World War II, and would be part of the No. 7 Canadian General Hospital when they landed on Juno Beach during D-Day. He was released from the Army in 1945. He was present for the liberation of the Stalag X-B camp.

Burden graduated from Dalhousie University in 1952, receiving his medical degree, and would work in the field for the next 50 years. He would serve as Chief of Staff at All Saints Hospital in Springhill.

Having worked in the mines in Springhill during his time at Dalhousie, Burden would take part in the rescue operations of both the 1956 and 1958 mining disasters. He would be the first to go down in 1956 to begin the rescue, and would spend a total of 33 hours in the mines in 1958.

Burden was awarded the Order of Nova Scotia in 2003. He died on March 17, 2018, at the age of 95.
