= Jacques Clemens =

Dutch Catholic priest

- Born: 11 July 1909; The Hague, Netherlands
- Died: 7 March 2018 (aged 108); Loverval, Wallonia, Belgium

Jacques Clemens (11 July 1909 – 7 March 2018) was a Dutch Catholic priest. He was the parish priest of The Bultia (Ham-sur-Heure-Nalinnes, Belgium) from 1958. Between 2016 and his death on 7 March 2018, at the age of 108 he was thought to be the oldest living priest.

== Biography ==
=== Early life ===
Jacques Clemens was born on 11 July 1909 in The Hague, Netherlands. After his novitiate and studies in philosophy, he studied theology at the Diocesan Seminary of Liège and was ordained a priest in Liège Cathedral on 5 July 1936.

=== Career ===
He was a teacher at the Seminar of Gerpinnes (now St. Augustine College). In 1944 Clemens was appointed Vicar of Ham-sur-Heure-Nalinnes (south of Charleroi) and Chaplain at The Bultia, a hamlet in the village without its own place of worship. The Church of Saint-Benoît was completed in 1957 and on 1 January 1958 Clemens officially became the first parish priest of the new parish, remaining there for 67 years.

=== Later life ===
Clemens's health deteriorated following a fall at the age of 102 and he decided to reduce his activities. He retired in 2015 but continued to provide religious services on Sundays. He celebrated his 108th birthday on 11 July 2017, dying at that age by March 7, 2018.
