= Ken M. Wallace =

British mechanical engineer (1944–2018)

Kenneth Michael Wallace FREng (1944–2018) was a British engineer.

He studied mechanical engineering at the University of Manchester Institute of Science and Technology. After graduation, Wallace worked for Rolls-Royce until 1971, when he started an engineering firm. He began lecturing at the University of Cambridge in 1978, and retired in 2007. Over the course of his career, Wallace became a fellow of Selwyn College (1978), the Institution of Mechanical Engineers (1991), the Smallpeice Trust (1994), Institution of Engineering Designers (1994), and the Royal Academy of Engineering (1999). In 2002, he received the Sir Misha Black Award for Innovation in Design Education. He was named an honorary fellow of The Design Society in 2007. Wallace died on 3 March 2018, aged 73.
