= Adam Ostrowski (RAF officer) =

Polish RAF pilot (1919–2018)

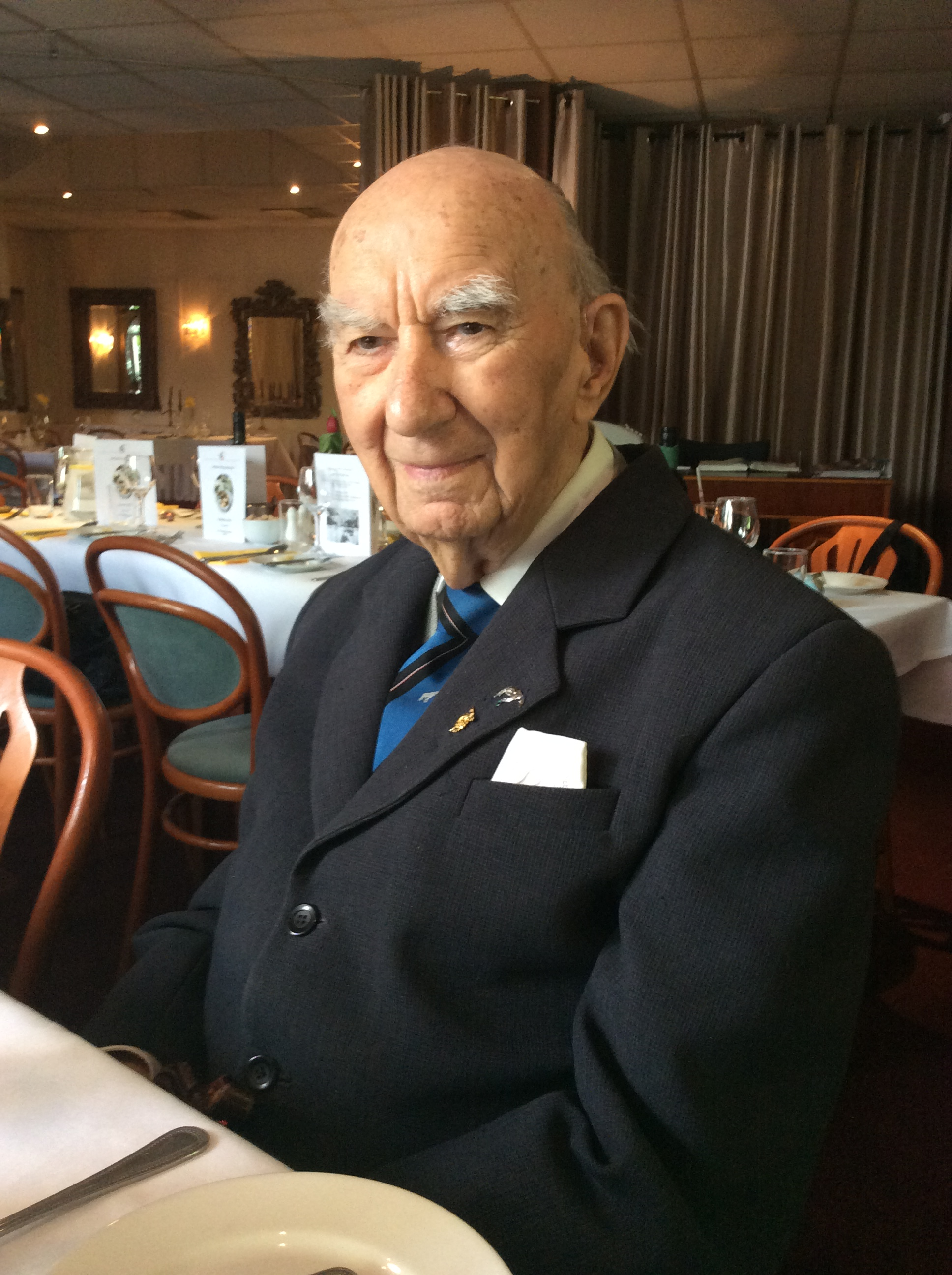
- Born: 15 February 1919; Borysław
- Died: 9 March 2018 (aged 99); London

Adam Mieczysław Ostrowski (15 February 1919 in Borysław – 9 March 2018 in London) was a Polish RAF pilot who fought in World War II and was active in Polish organisations.

== Biography ==
As a military pilot, Ostrowski flew in the 317 "Wileński" RAF Fighter Squadron, where he served as a lieutenant. Later he was promoted to colonel. He remained in Great Britain after the war. He became involved in Polish expatriates and veterans' activities. In 1990, he became the Chairman of the Polish Airmen's Association in London. On 11 November 1990 he was awarded the Officer's Cross of the Order of Polonia Restituta by the President of Poland in exile Ryszard Kaczorowski. On 23 July 2012, in recognition of outstanding merits in the activities for the benefit of Polish-born veterans, President Bronisław Komorowski awarded him the Commander's Cross with the Star of the Order of Polonia Restituta.

He was one of eight Polish Spitfire pilots to sign a special edition print to commemorate the Polish contribution to the Battle of Britain.
