= Ray Wilkins (footballer, born 1928) =

English footballer

Personal information
- Full name: Raymond John Hamilton Wilkins
- Date of birth: 16 August 1928
- Place of birth: Church Gresley, Derbyshire, England
- Date of death: 3 March 2018 (aged 89)
- Position: Forward

Senior career*
Years	Team	Apps	(Gls)
- Moira United
1950–1954	Derby County	30	(11)
1954–1957	Boston United		
1957–1958	Wrexham	3	(1)
- Oswestry Town
- Macclesfield Town
- Gresley Rovers
- Wilmorton
- Alvaston

Managerial career
- 1964–1966: Crewton Sports
- * Club domestic league appearances and goals

Raymond John Hamilton Wilkins (16 August 1928 – 3 March 2018) was an English footballer, who played as a forward. He made appearances in the English football league in the 1950s for Derby County and Wrexham.

== Playing career ==
After three years of National Service in the Royal Navy, Wilkins was spotted playing for local club Moira United by Derby County, who signed him in January 1950.

He would spend 4 years with The Rams, before signing for non-league Boston United in 1954. He would be 1 of 6 former Derby County players to play for Boston United during their 1–6 away win against Derby in the second round proper of the 1955–56 FA Cup.

In 1957 he would return to league football with Wrexham, however would only make 3 appearances for the Welsh club before leaving in 1958 because of a family illness.

He would also appear for non-league teams Oswestry Town, Macclesfield Town, Gresley Rovers, Wilmorton and Alvaston.

== Managerial career ==
Wilkins would manage Crewton Sports from 1964 to 1966

== Post-managerial career ==
Wilkins would become a P.E. teacher at a school in Mackworth, retiring in the 1980s. He was also a keen golf player.

== Death ==
Wilkins died on 3 March 2018. His funeral took place at Derby Crematorium on 20 March.
