= Sally Bidgood =

British botanist (1948–2018)

- Born: Gillian Sally Bidgood; 13 April 1948; Corbridge
- Died: 18 March 2018 (aged 69); Hammersmith
- Occupation: Plant collector
- Scientific career
- Fields: Botany
- Author abbrev. (botany): Bidgood

Gillian Sally Bidgood (13 April 1948, in Corbridge – 18 March 2018, in Hammersmith) was a British botanist and plant collector noted for her study of the flora of Ethiopia, Zambia, and Tanzania, particularly Bignoniaceae.

She attended Ackworth School (1959–1965), Haydon Bridge Technical School and then Froebel College, Roehampton. Bidgood worked at the Royal Botanic Gardens, Kew from 1973 to 2008, and over the course of her career took part in gathering over 13,000 specimens of African plants, describing at least two dozen species.

She was also active as a trade unionist, being both a branch secretary and branch chair for Prospect at Kew.

Coleus sallyae (A.J.Paton) A.J.Paton, Cyphostemma bidgoodiae Verdc., Dyschoriste sallyae Vollesen, Erythrocephalum sallyae Beentje, Fuirena bidgoodiae Hoenselaar & Muasya, Pavetta bidgoodiae Bridson are named for her.

She was born Gillian Sally Lee, and married the artist Clive Bidgood in 1976 at St Anne's Church, Kew. She retired in 2008 and died on 18 March 2018.

The standard author abbreviation Bidgood is used to indicate this person as the author when citing a botanical name.

Data related to Gillian Sally Bidgood at Wikispecies
