= Vladimir Gerasimov (footballer, born 1989) =

Russian footballer

Personal information
- Full name: Vladimir Dmitriyevich Gerasimov
- Date of birth: 12 April 1989
- Place of birth: Korolyov, Moscow Oblast, RSFSR, USSR
- Date of death: 9 March 2018 (aged 28)
- Place of death: Zhejiang, China
- Height: 1.75 m (5 ft 9 in)
- Position: Striker

Senior career*
Years	Team	Apps	(Gls)
2007	FC Volochanin-Ratmir Vyshny Volochyok	3	(0)
2008	FC Spartak-Avto Moscow (D4)		
2009	Bohemians Prague	1	(0)
2010	FC Nika Moscow	10	(1)
2011–2012	FC Kaluga	32	(4)
2012	FC Metallurg Vyksa	11	(0)
2013–2014	FC Volgomost		
2014–2015	FC Metallist Korolyov		
- * Club domestic league appearances and goals

Vladimir Dmitriyevich Gerasimov (Russian: Владимир Дмитриевич Герасимов; 12 April 1989 – 9 March 2018) was a Russian professional footballer who played as a striker.

== Death ==
Gerasimov died on 9 March 2018 in Zhejiang province, China, after a hit-and-run incident. Gerasimov was knocked from his electric scooter onto a busy street by a car; the driver fled the scene without seeing to Gerasimov's injuries. No passers-by assisted Gerasimov. He died of his injuries two hours later while still lying unattended in the street. Gerasimov was 28 years old.
