= Antonia Syson =

- Born: 23 February 1973; Botswana
- Died: 25 March 2018 (aged 45); Lafayette, Indiana, USA

Academic background
- Education: University of California, Berkeley
- Thesis: Reading for the Novel: Knowledge, Persuasion, and the Divine Narratives of Vergil’s Aeneid

Antonia Jane Reobone Syson (23 February 1973 – 25 March 2018) was a British-American classical scholar specialising in the study of Virgil's Aeneid.

== Early life ==
Antonia was born in Botswana whilst her father, John, was private secretary to the president, Sir Seretse Khama and her mother, Lucy, was undertaking research on rural development for the United Nations. She had a brother Luke and a sister Lydia, a writer. The Sysons returned to the UK in 1973, where Antonia attended Hungerford primary school and Camden School for Girls. In 1991 Antonia went to Magdalen College, Oxford to study Classics under Oliver Taplin before, in 1995, taking her PhD in classics at the University of California, Berkeley. Antonia credited her Latin teachers at Camden and Birmingham for helping her develop her lasting connection to Classics.

== Career ==
Her 2003 thesis, supervised by Kathleen McCarthy was titled “Reading for the Novel: Knowledge, Persuasion, and the Divine Narratives of Vergil’s Aeneid”. After graduating she spent one year at Northwestern University as a Mellon Postdoctoral fellow in Classics, before moving to the University of Chicago as lecturer in Latin (2004–2006), and then to Dartmouth College as lecturer in classics (2006–2008). In 2008, she joined the classics faculty at Purdue University, Indiana. In 2014 she was promoted to associate professor with tenure.

== Select publications ==
- Syson, A. 2009. "Born to Speak: Ingenium and Natura in Tacitus’s Dialogue on Orators", Arethusa 42(1). 45–75.
- Syson, A. 2012. "Reading the Aeneid with Intermediate Latin Students", Teaching Classical Languages 4(1). 44–63.
- Syson, A. 2013. Fama and Fiction in Vergil's Aeneid. Ohio State University Press.
- Syson, A. 2017. "Filthy Harpies and Fictive Knowledge in Philip Pullman’s His Dark Materials Trilogy". in Stevens, B. and Rogers, B. (eds) Classical Traditions in Modern Fantasy. Oxford. 233–249.
