= Joseph Israel (musician) =

American reggae musician (1977–2018)

- Born: Joseph Montgomery Fennel; October 10, 1977; Tulsa, Oklahoma, U.S.
- Origin: Fayetteville, Arkansas, U.S.
- Died: March 2, 2018 (aged 40)
- Genres: Reggae
- Label: New Door

Joseph Israel (born Joseph Montgomery Fennel; October 10, 1977 – March 2, 2018) was an American reggae musician. Described musically as having a "blend of soul, jazz, folk, world, and reggae", he collaborated with many well-known performers in the reggae genre, including Ziggy Marley and Matisyahu. Israel was living in Northern California at the time of his death.

== Early life ==
Joseph Montgomery Fennel was born in Tulsa, Oklahoma, on October 10, 1977, to parents Joe and Jean Ann Fennel. At an early age, he was introduced to reggae music by his father and uncle, who were enthusiasts who often traveled to Jamaica. At age 12, Joseph received his first reggae cassettes — namely Bob Marley, Legend; Peter Tosh, Wanted Dread & Alive; Jimmy Cliff, Special; and Burning Spear, Marcus Garvey — and was highly inspired by both the musicianship and the message involved. "Their music really inspired me to become who I am. They were speaking about the truth, humanity and about changing things in a positive way. And even when things are tough, we must keep going. So I found a common thread in reggae music that spoke to my heart."

== Music career ==
Fennel soon adopted the pseudonym Joseph Israel, with the last name being a reflection of his spirituality and reach for the blessings intended for all people, tribes, and tongues, based on the teachings of Messiah Yeshua of Nazareth. Joseph began writing songs of his own, and formed the reggae band Kepha (Aramaic for "Rock") which did well regionally. The group recorded Redemption Time in Fayetteville, Arkansas. He also started the group Lions of Israel, who he performed with throughout the Midwest starting in 2002. This culminated in 2004, when Joseph and the band were invited to open for Ziggy Marley at a sold-out concert in Fayetteville. His well-received acoustic performance brought Joseph to the attention of Marley's bassist Chris Meredith, who brought Israel to Tuff Gong Studios in Kingston, Jamaica, where he recorded his self-produced and financed debut solo album Gone Are the Days, released in 2005. While its lyrics are of headline-torn news reports and a call for spiritual awakening, the album's sound itself was influenced by session collaborators Earl "Chinna" Smith, Dean Fraser, and Uziah Thompson. In 2006, Joseph Israel was signed to New Door Records of Universal Music Group, and in 2007 Gone Are the Days peaked at number 11 on the Top Reggae album charts. In 2008 Israel released the download-only EP Teach Your Children, to benefit Restore Humanity, a non-profit charitable outfit, assisting the needs of oppressed and poverty-stricken families worldwide. "It was a lot of fun to make", says Joseph of the sessions. "I was able to record some great songs, while helping to bring awareness to the Restore Humanity organization", which was founded by Sarah Fennel, Joseph's sister. Following its release, Joseph Israel toured the US, performing in various cities. On August 13, 2013, Israel released his second album, titled Kingdom Road, through Lions of Israel, Inc.
