= Harold Rosewarne =

Australian rules footballer (1930–2018)

Personal information
- Full name: Harold Kenneth Rosewarne
- Born: 13 August 1930
- Died: 9 March 2018 (aged 87)
- Original team: South Districts
- Height: 185 cm (6 ft 1 in)
- Weight: 76 kg (168 lb)

Playing career^{1}
Years	Club	Games (Goals)
1952–54	South Melbourne	12 (2)
- ^{1} Playing statistics correct to the end of 1954.

Harold Kenneth Rosewarne (13 August 1930 – 9 March 2018) was an Australian rules footballer who played with South Melbourne in the Victorian Football League (VFL).
