= José Arranz =

Spanish Catholic priest and banker (b. 1930)

José Arranz Arranz
- Born: 17 February 1930; Mambrilla de Castrejón, Burgos, Spain
- Died: 12 March 2018 (aged 88); Torralba del Moral, Soria, Spain
- Education: Pontifical University of Salamanca; University of Navarra
- Occupations: Catholic priest Canon of Burgo de Osma Cathedral (1986-1998)

José Arranz Arranz (17 February 1930 – 12 March 2018), was a Spanish priest, Canon of Burgo de Osma Cathedral between 1986 and 1998 and founder of the bank Caja Rural in Soria.

== Early life and education ==
He studied ecclesiastical studies at the diocesan Seminary of Burgo de Osma. Later he received a licentiate in theology and philosophy from the Pontifical University of Salamanca; in philosophy and letters from the University of Navarra; and the doctorate in art history in Pamplona and from the University of Barcelona.

== Career ==
On 31 August 1952, he received the priestly ordination from the Bishop of Osma-Soria, Saturnino Rubio Montiel in the Cathedral of Burgos. His first pastoral commission took him to the Castilian municipalities of Huerta de Rey and San Esteban de Gormaz. Later he attended other parishes in the area: Burgo de Osma (1955-1963), Barcebal, Barcebalejo, Berzosa, Quintanilla de Tres Barrios, Rejas de San Esteban and Sotos del Burgo.

He was also entrusted with the chaplaincy of the monastery of the Carmelite Mothers in Burgo de Osma and the public "Associación Pública de Fieles Reparadores de Nuestra Señora la Virgen de los Dolores", in El Escorial, Madrid.

He was appointed Episcopal representative of Catechesis and Religious Teaching (1959-1976), Episcopal Art Delegate (1970-1994), canon of the Cathedral of Burgo de Osma (1986-1998), and president of the Cabildo. He devoted a good part of his life to teaching at the Colegio de San Vicente de Paúl in El Burgo and the seminary Santo Domingo de Guzmán.

== Later life ==
He knew how to reconcile his priestly work with other activities such as: the management of the artistic heritage of the diocese, the impulse and diffusion of the apparitions of the Virgen del Escorial, and the foundation and impulse of Caja Rural de Soria Credit Union, who gave him an homage in 2016.

He died in the residence of Nuestra Señora de la Luz of Torralba del Moral, on 12 March 2018. His funeral was held at the Cathedral of El Burgo, presided over by the Bishop of Osma-Soria, Abilio Martínez Varea.
