= Bibliography of the Rwandan genocide =

This is a bibliography for primary sources, books and articles on the personal and general accounts, and the accountabilities, of the 1994 Rwandan genocide.

== Primary sources ==
- International Criminal Tribunal for Rwanda Archives, Judicial Records and Archives Database
- Gacaca Archives
- Genocide Archive of Rwanda

== Personal accounts ==
- Do I still have a life?: Voices from the aftermath of war in Rwanda and Burundi (2000) by John M. Janzen and Reinhild Kauenhoven Janzen.
- Eyewitness to a Genocide: The United Nations and Rwanda (2003), an account by Michael N. Barnett, a political officer at the U.S. Mission to the United Nations during the genocide and constructivist scholar, analyzing the international community's response during the Rwandan genocide.
- Genocide in Rwanda: A Collective Memory (1999). This account is an amalgam of authorships, by the editors John A. Berry and Carol Pott. It is a broad look at the cultural dynamics before and after the Rwandan Genocide. The editors of the contributions were residents in Rwanda before the genocide and left in April 1994 with the evacuation of foreign nationals returning in October 1994 with the UNHCHR's Field Operation in Rwanda. The book stems from a conference organized by the editors and includes witness testimony and sections written by Rwandans with expertise in the history and culture of Rwanda.
- Justice on the Grass (2005), an account of the Rwandan genocide by the author Dina Temple-Raston. This book focuses on the trials of three Hutu broadcasters of anti-Tutsi sentiment. It queries whether they are as guilty as the perpetrators of the violence.
- Not My Time to Die: A Testimony, originally published in French and then translated into English, it is a first-person account from Yolande Mukagasana, a nurse and mother of three at the time, who witnessed and escaped the violence as a Tutsi.
- Left to Tell: One Woman's Story of Surviving the Rwandan Holocaust (2006). An account of the Rwandan genocide by the author Immaculee Ilibagiza. She was a Tutsi whose family were murdered when the Hutu nationalists ran riot throughout the country killing men, women, the elderly, and children. This book tells her story.
- Life Laid Bare: The Survivors in Rwanda Speak (2007), a collection of accounts in the same general region. Compiled by Jean Hatzfeld.
- Machete Season: The Killers in Rwanda Speak (2006), an account of the Rwandan genocide by journalist Jean Hatzfeld. This book looks at the killers themselves, and features testimonies of ten men, now in prison, with the attempt to understand their state of mind, and the forces behind the atrocities.
- An Ordinary Man (2006), an account of the Rwandan genocide by the author Paul Rusesabagina. He was a Hutu owner of a hotel in Kigali, and his conscience led him to shelter a number of people under threat of death by the militias. The book is the basis for the film Hotel Rwanda.
- One Thousand Hills (2016) by James Roy and Noël Zihabamwe is a young adult book based loosely on the experiences of Zihabamwe, who lived through the genocide at the age of nine.
- Season of Blood (1995), Fergal Keane's Orwell Prize-winning account of his journey through Rwanda during the genocide and its aftermath.
- The Shallow Graves of Rwanda (2001), an account by the author Shaharyan M. Khan. Khan wrote his book from the point of view of a special UN representative. It chronicles the struggle for national reconciliation and the role of the UN in the aftermath.
- Shake Hands with the Devil (2003). An account of the Rwandan Genocide by the author Romeo Dallaire. He was the commander of the United Nation Assistance Mission for Rwanda (UNAMIR), who did not leave the country when the massacres began, and kept the media in touch with the situation. This book tells his story. It is the basis of two films of the same name, a documentary and a docudrama.
- Surviving the Slaughter: The Ordeal of a Rwandan Refugee in Zaire (2004), an account by sociologist Marie Beatrice Umutesi, a Hutu often mistaken for a Tutsi, who was forced to flee into then-Zaire during the Rwandan genocide.
- The Men Who Killed Me: Rwandan Survivors of Sexual Violence (2009), an account of 17 testimonials of survivors of sexual violence (sixteen women and one man) who bear witness to the crimes committed against hundreds of thousands of others. By Anne-Marie de Brouwer, Sandra Ka Hon Chu and Samer Muscati. Foreword by Stephen Lewis; afterword by Eve Ensler.
- We Wish to Inform You That Tomorrow We Will Be Killed with Our Families (1998), an account of the Rwandan genocide by the journalist Philip Gourevitch. The book describes events and causes throughout the genocide and in the aftermath, with interviews of Tutsis and Hutus.
- Rwanda's collective amnesia, by author Benjamin Sehene in The UNESCO Courier (1999).
- Tested To The Limit: A Genocide Survivor's Story Of Pain, Resilience And Hope (2012) by Consolee Nishimwe
- Alice On the Run: One Child's Journey Through the Rwandan Civil War (2022) by Gaspard Talmasse, a biographical graphic novel about the Belgian writer and artist's partner, Alice Cyuzuzo, and her family surviving the Rwandan civil war and genocide. Taking place from 1994 to 2003, the book chronicles Alice's forced separation from her parents and siblings, survival in post-genocide Rwanda, and eventual reunion with her family in Belgium where they had sought refuge.

== Analysis ==
- Accounting For Horror: Post-Genocide Debates in Rwanda] (2004), an account by the author Nigel Eltringham. This book looks at the events with a critical view of the United Nations, and the international community. It provides a provocative historical slant on the atrocities, and challenges the reader, by the assessment of social interrelationships.
- Brickyards to graveyards: From Production to Genocide in Rwanda (2002), an examination of the social dynamics through Rwandan history, leading up to the Rwandan genocide.
- Christianity and Genocide in Rwanda by Timothy Longman (2009), a study of the role of Christian churches in the 1994 genocide against the Tutsi.
- Collapse: How Societies Choose to Fail or Succeed (2005), a study of numerous "disappeared" societies by author Jared Diamond. Includes an examination (with references) of Rwandan society and land distribution immediately before and after the genocide.
- Development, aid and conflict: Reflections from the case of Rwanda (1996) by Peter Uvin.
- The Seventh Circle (1996) by Benet Davetian.
- GenoDynamics, a highly detailed empirical investigation of who did what to whom during the 100 days of violence by Christian Davenport and Allan Stam.
- Justice in Africa : Rwanda's genocide, its courts, and the UN criminal tribunal (2000), an analysis of the legal proceedings of the aftermath of the Rwandan genocide.
- "Leave None to Tell the Story: Genocide in Rwanda". Human Rights Watch. March 1999.
- The Limits of Humanitarian Intervention: Genocide in Rwanda (2001) by Alan J. Kuperman, an analysis of the logistical limitations of humanitarian military intervention in the Rwandan Genocide.
- Media and the Rwanda Genocide (2007), an analysis of the role print, radio and television media played in the carrying out of and the aftermath of the Rwandan genocide. Edited by Allan Thompson
- The Order of Genocide, a scholarly investigation of the Rwandan genocide in the context of genocide studies and conflict resolution. By Scott Straus.
- People betrayed : the role of the West in Rwanda's genocide (2000), an analysis of the international community's response to the Rwandan genocide.
- Re-Imagining Rwanda: Conflict, Survival and Disinformation in the Late Twentieth Century (2002), an investigation of local dynamics in Rwanda during and after the Rwandan Genocide.
- The Role of France in the Rwandan Genocide (2007), an analysis of France's relationship with Rwanda leading up to and during the Rwandan genocide. By Daniela Kroslak.
- Rwanda's Genocide: The Politics of Global Justice (2005), an analysis of the role of the international court in legal proceedings resulting from the Rwandan Genocide.
- Rwanda – The Preventable Genocide (2000), a report by the "International Panel of Eminent Personalities to Investigate the 1994 genocide in Rwanda and Surrounding Events" (IPEP). Established by the Organization of African Unity in late 1998 to investigate the history of Rwanda and the circumstances leading up to the 1994 genocide, the IPEP operated from January 1999 to June 2000a report by International Panel of Eminent Personalities to Investigate the 1994 genocide in Rwanda and Surrounding Events International Panel of Eminent Personalities to Investigate the 1994 genocide in Rwanda and Surrounding Events established by the Organization of African Unity in late 1998 to investigate the history of Rwanda and the circumstances leading up to the 1994 genocide, the IPEP operated from January 1999 to June 2000. 318 pages, published on 7 July 2000.
- Sacrifice as terror: the Rwandan genocide of 1994 (1999), an analysis of the Rwandan genocide in the context of cultural dynamics.
- When Victims Become Killers: Colonialism, Nativism, and the Genocide in Rwanda (2002), an analysis of the social dynamics in Rwanda leading up to the genocide.
- In Praise of Blood: The Crimes of the Rwandan Patriotic Front (2018)

== Comparative studies ==
- Accountability for international humanitarian law violations: the case of Rwanda and East Timor (2005) by Mohamed C. Othman.
- Africa: The Holocausts of Rwanda and Sudan (2006) by Lucian Niemeyer; foreword by Bill Richardson.
- Genocide in Cambodia and Rwanda: New Perspectives (2006); edited by Susan E. Cook.
- Genocide and crisis in Central Africa: Conflict roots, mass violence, and regional war (2002) by Christian P. Scherrer; foreword by Robert Melson.
- Holocaust and Other Genocides: History, Representation, Ethics (2002); edited by Helmut Walser Smith.
- The Dark Side of Democracy: Explaining Ethnic Cleansing (2005) by Michael Mann
