= Carol Pott =

Carol Pott is an author and editor who lived in Rwanda during the Rwandan genocide. She writes about the genocide and has published a book titled Genocide in Rwanda: A Collective Memory.

== Career ==
Currently, Pott is the communications manager for the Lawrence Berkeley National Laboratory's Computing Sciences Area. Pott joined the Lab in January 2019.

Pott is the coeditor (with John Berry) of Genocide in Rwanda: A Collective Memory. She was living in Rwanda when the genocide started and was evacuated with foreign nationals in April 1994. She returned in October 1994 with the UN Rwanda Emergency Office and High Commission for Human Rights. Excerpts from her journal were published in The Washington Post.

Genocide in Rwanda: A Collective Memory was the result of a conference of the same name organized by the editors in 1995 and included witness testimony and presentations on history and culture by Rwandan experts intending to provide foreign aid workers with context for their work. The resulting book combined those elements with more historical and cultural background as well as an English translation of The Hutu Ten Commandments and was published by Howard University in 1999. The book is included on most reading lists and bibliographies of the Rwandan genocide.

She is also the editor and contributing author of the bestselling The Blue Pages: A Directory of Companies Rated by Their Politics and Practices and contributed to the revised edition. She started Editorial Girl in 2010 and scaled the business back in 2016. She is the lead singer for the French yé-yé revival band, Rue '66.
