= Scott Strauss =

Scott Strauss may refer to:

- Scott Strauss, character in Suburgatory
- Scott Strauss, character played by Stephen Dorff in World Trade Center

== See also ==
- Scott Straus, American professor of political science
