= Jean Hatzfeld =

French author and journalist

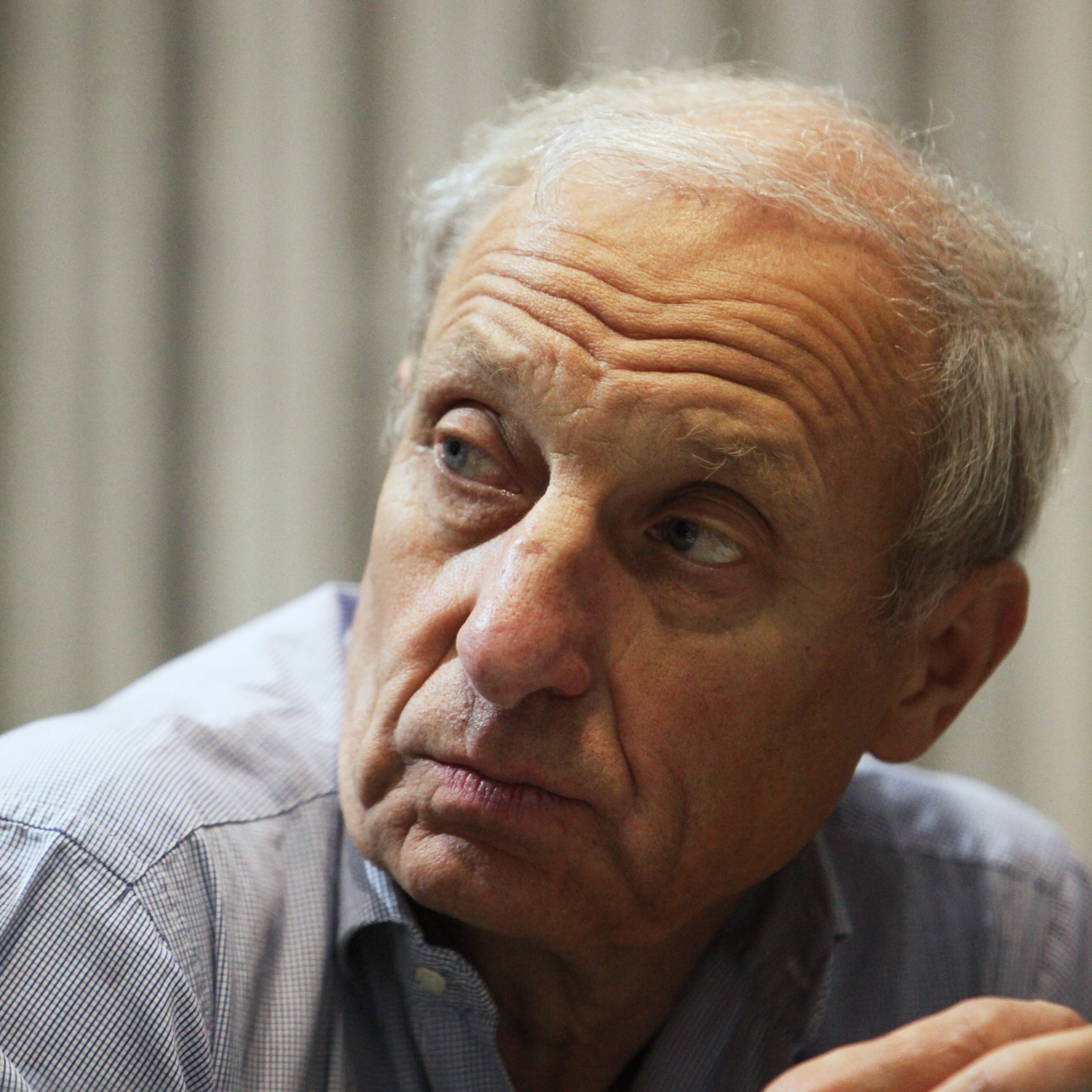
Jean Hatzfeld

Jean Hatzfeld is a French author and journalist who wrote extensively about the Bosnian War and the Rwandan Genocide in Rwanda.

== Biography ==
=== Youth ===
Born on 14 September 1949 in Madagascar, Hatzfeld was the fourth child in the family of Olivier and Maud Hatzfeld. He is the grandson of Hellenist Jean Hatzfeld. He spent his childhood in Chambon-sur-Lignon, a village in the mountains of Auvergne in France, the town where his parents took refuge in 1942 and whose inhabitants distinguished themselves by welcoming thousands of Jews during the war. During World War II, German occupation forces deported his grandparents from France, but they survived.

In 1968, Hatzfeld travelled to Kabul and Peshawar, Pakistan. On his return to France, he worked in several factories before settling in Paris.

=== Work as a journalist ===
In 1975, Hatzfeld published his first article in the French newspaper Libération as a sports journalist. He then wrote serialized stories. Hatzfeld finally became a foreign correspondent, traveling to Israel, Palestine, Poland, Romania and other places in Eastern Europe.

Hatzfeld's first trip to Beirut convinced him to become a war correspondent. For 22 years, he covered wars in Africa and the Middle East, as well as the Bosnian War.

After his arrival in Rwanda as a reporter, shortly after the Rwandan genocide, Hatzfeld was struck by the collective failure of journalists covering the event and their incapacity to face up to the silence of the survivors. He decided to live in Rwanda to work with the Tutsi survivors of Nyamata, a village in the Bugesera district.

== Literary work ==
Hatzfeld has written books based on his experience of being on war frontlines. In some of the books, Hatzfeld returns to speak with people he encountered during his years as a reporter. He also returns in his thoughts to places and restages various war themes, as well as the writings of war. In his last novels, he revisits the world of sport, especially in imbued by wars of the past.

In his Rwandan books, Hatzfeld uses the narratives of the people who lived through the experience of extermination. The first book, Dans le nu de la vie (Life laid bare: The Survivors in Rwanda speak), was written with the help of fourteen survivors living in the hills of Nyamata. He continues his work with a group of Hutu who took part in the genocide, who lived in the same hills and who were imprisoned in the Rilima penitentiary. As a result of these conversations, in 2003 he published Une saison de machettes (Machete Season: The Killers in Rwanda speak). He then wrote a novel, "La ligne de flottaison" (The Waterline), about a war correspondent struggling to return to his life in Paris.

In Englebert des collines, Hatzfeld talks about Englebert, a survivor of the swamps, a vagabond and alcoholic whom he has known since his first days in Nyamata. In this book, Hatzfeld narrates the passage of time, the life of the protagonists of his first books “after” the genocide, the impossible dialogue between survivors and killers after the latter have left prison, their fears, doubts and lack of understanding, and above all their phantoms. Twenty years after the butchery, he returns to the banks of the swamps to work with the children of the killers and the survivors, who already appeared in his former books, youths who have not experienced the machetes, but who have inherited the memory of them and who share a language consisting of metaphorical and often poetic vocabulary.

Several of Hatzfeld's books have been translated into different European and Asian languages, among them English.

Hatzfeld contributed to L’Autre Journal, GEO, Autrement, Rolling Stone, Cahiers du cinéma, Le Monde, Actuel. He has also written for various magazines and collective books in France and abroad (such as The Paris Review and the collection BPI Centre Pompidou); he also acted as a co-author of screen-writings.

Some of Hatzfeld's books have been adapted for the theatre. These include plays such as Igishanga, adapted and played by Isabelle Lafon; Une saison de machettes, adapted and staged by Dominique Lurcel; Dans le nu de la vie, directed by Jacques Taroni and produced by France-Culture for the Avignon Festival; Les voix de Nyamata, adapted and staged by Anna Feissel-Leibovici; Exil, adapted, staged and played by Sonia Wieder-Atherton on her cello at the Philharmonie of Paris.

== Bibliography ==
- L’air de la guerre: sur les routes de Croatie et de Bosnie-Herzégovine, récit, Paris, L’Olivier, 1994
- La guerre au bord du fleuve, roman, Paris, L’Olivier, 1999
- Dans le nu de la vie: récits des marais rwandais, Paris, Le Seuil, 2000
- Une saison de machettes, récits, Paris, Le Seuil, 2003
- La ligne de flottaison, roman, Paris, Le Seuil, 2005
- La stratégie des antilopes, the third part about the Tutsi genocide, Paris, Le Seuil, 2007
- Où en est la nuit?, Paris, Gallimard, 2011
- Robert Mitchum ne revient pas, Paris, Gallimard, 2013
- Englebert des collines, the fourth part about the Tutsi genocide, Paris, Gallimard, 2014
- Un papa de sang, the fifth part about the Tutsi genocide, Paris, Gallimard, 2015
- Deux mètres dix, Paris, Gallimard, 2018
- Là où tout se tait, Paris, Gallimard, 2020

== Participations ==
- Serge Daney, Petite bibliothèque des Cahiers du Cinéma
- Après-guerre(s), Autrement
- Bosnia (in small part), British Library
- Claude Lanzmann, Un Voyant dans le siècle, Gallimard
- Armistice, Gallimard

== Notable distinctions ==
- 1998: prix Bayeux for war correspondents
- 2000: prix France-Culture, for Dans le nu de la vie
- 2003: prix Femina essai, for Une saison de machettes
- 2003: prix Joseph Kessel, for Une saison de machettes
- 2006: The Freedom of Expression Award (category of books), Great-Britain
- 2007: Prix Médicis, for La stratégie des antilopes
- 2010: Ryszard Kapuściński Award, in Warsaw, for La stratégie des antilopes
- 2011: grand prix de Littérature sportive, for Où en est la nuit?
- 2016: prix Mémoire Albert Cohen, for Un papa de sang
- 2018: Jules Rimet Prize for Deux mètres dix
