= United Nations Rwanda Emergency Office =

The United Nations Rwanda Emergency Office (UNREO), was an ad hoc United Nations group charged with gathering information and facilitating coordination between aid agencies in the aftermath of the 1994 Rwandan genocide.
