= Jean Hatzfeld (hellenist) =

20th century French archaeologist

Jean Hatzfeld (29 November 1880 – 30 May 1947) was a French archaeologist and Hellenist. He was a member of the French School at Athens, a professor at the Sorbonne (1928–1930) and at the École pratique des hautes études (1937).

== Selected works ==
- Histoire de la Grèce ancienne, Paris, 1926
  - Third edition, revised and corrected by André Aymard, Paris, Payot, 1950
  - reissued by Petite Bibliothèque Payot, 1962, 1995, 2002
- Alcibiade. Étude sur l'histoire d'Athènes à la fin du Ve siècle, Paris, Presses universitaires de France, 1940
- La Grèce et son héritage, Paris, Éditions Montaigne, (Aubier), 1945
