= Machete Season =

Book by Jean Hatzfeld

- Author: Jean Hatzfeld
- Original title: Une saison de machettes
- Translator: Linda Coverdale
- Language: French
- Publisher: Éditions du Seuil (French); Farrar, Straus and Giroux (English)
- Publication date: 2003
- Publication place: France
- English publication date: 2006

Machete Season (French: Une saison de machettes) is a book by Jean Hatzfeld published in 2003 by Éditions du Seuil. It was published in English by Farrar, Straus and Giroux, with the translation from French by Linda Coverdale. The author reports testimonies of convicted killers of the Rwandan genocide.

Hatzfeld first spoke with survivors, whose story he wrote in Le nu de la vie, and then looked at how the killers experienced the same event, partly as a result of requests from readers. A friend and Rwandan interpreter gave him the idea of meeting prisoners sentenced to long sentences who would speak more readily than people who were free, and put him in contact with a group of men he knew before the genocide. Hatzfeld met them in prison in 2001 and 2002.

== Witnesses ==
It comprises a group of ten people, most of them farmers, who lived in the hills around the town of Nyamata and were already close friends before the killing started. They were all imprisoned in the penitentiary of Rilima. In the spring of 1994, they became the relentless executioners of their neighbours, including friends, members of their soccer team and people with whom they sang at Sunday mass. They worked hard and loved partying, but were not particularly racist. One had even married a Tutsi. They were keen to do the "work" that was set for them. They did not make any effort to spare any Tutsi they may have befriended before.

== Approach and reflections of the author ==
Jean Hatzfeld had not considered interviewing them; it was the demand of readers of his previous book that made him change his mind. While he was gathering their testimony, he wondered why and how it was possible for these men to kill this way. During the testimonies, the reader gathers answers:

- it is easy to obey when the instruction is simple: "Rule No. 1 is to kill, Rule No. 2, there was none."
- defending the Tutsi cause or simply asking questions could immediately lead to death (although no case was recorded by Hatzfeld);
- the plunder rewarded those who had killed;
- the flight of the "whites" as soon as killings started conveyed to them the message that they would not then be accused or punished;
- they no longer saw the human being behind the Tutsi, but the "cockroach" as the anti-Tutsi propaganda had persuaded them.

The genocidal process had been prepared for several months, and weapons, mainly machetes, had been piled up. These killings appeared as inevitable in the aftermath of the assassination of President Juvénal Habyarimana. The killers who speak did show zeal during the killings, but little regret when they tell the stories. They didn't seem to know whether the killing was right or wrong. They hope to return home and resume their place in the family and their lives "as before".

The author groups their testimonies by theme and includes also precise comments triggered by their words plus other general considerations and historical summaries. He does not offer an overall conclusion, simply allows readers to form their own opinion.

The interviews that collected these testimonies were individual and confidential. None knew what others had said.

== The title ==
A season that lasted from April to May. The killings were carried out during the day and the looting on the evenings, replacing the usual work in the fields. The killings were accompanied by plunder: they harvested money, beer, bananas to make alcohol, equipment, corrugated metal (to cover their houses and enclosures) and cows (usually bred by the Tutsi). On returning to the village, they eat and drank abundantly.

The machetes are the tools they use for cutting in maize and banana plantations. Rwandans grow up with a machete. These tools proved adequate to "cut" the Tutsi.

== Author's considerations ==
Through the answers of the killers, Hatzfeld reveals what genocide is and how it differs from war. Genocide is a state institution, a concerted project of extermination. A genocide is distinguished from war by the absence of fighting. The killings take place only in one direction.

The anti-Tutsi sentiment that had dominated Rwanda for 30 years now compounded with radio propaganda and Interahamwe activism prepared the Hutu to accept the idea of extermination. The killers of a genocide do not feel responsible. They speak without fatigue, without nervousness, without showing much emotion. When they approach the issue of forgiveness, they see it as a due and do not imagine that it cannot be granted.

== Reception ==
Writing in the Peace and Conflict Monitor, Sam Wolf points out how this book is perhaps the only one on the literature on genocide who asks “those responsible to explain it for us”; the book, he adds, will be of particular interest to “those with an interest in the psychology of violence a grand scale”. In the Washington Post, Alison Des Forges considered the book “limited in scope and marred by numerous errors” but, added, “its grassroots view of the genocide enriches and completes other, more formal, accounts.”

Publishers Weekly wrote that "Steering clear of politics, this important book succeeds in offering the reader some grasp of how such unspeakable acts unfolded."

Lee Ann Fujii of Georgetown University described the book as "a valuable window—albeit one that has been keenly shaped by the author—on the transformation of one group of men, from one region of the country, from ordinary peasants into genocidaires." She stated that the book had some "awkwardly translated passages from the original French". Fujii stated that while "Having the killers speak directly to the reader is a powerful tactic", the book does not specify what Hatzfield asked the genocide participants, and therefore it is not known whether ideas in their responses originated from the interviewer or the interviewees; according to Fujii, "This sense of streaming monologue, in turn, helps to render these men as cold-blooded monsters."
