= Nathan Gonzalez =

American scholar, author and journalist

Nathan Gonzalez (born in 1979) is an American scholar, author and journalist based in Orange County, California.

He is a Middle East analyst with the Foreign Policy in Focus think-tank, and founder of the website NationandState.org, an "open-source foreign policy think tank." He is also a blogger with The Huffington Post.

His book Engaging Iran: The Rise of a Middle East Powerhouse and America's Strategic Choice, borrows from the foreign policy school of realism. It suggests that a revised Nixon Doctrine should be pursued in the Middle East. His book, as well as some of his blog entries, suggest that Iran and the United States share many interests, and that America should actively pursue diplomacy with the Islamic Republic.

== Early life ==
Gonzalez has a B.A. in political science from UCLA and a Master of International Affairs from Columbia University. In 2002, he received a research prize from UCLA. His research "predicted that a U.S. invasion would bring about massive sectarian strife, pervasive anti-Americanism in Iraq, and a stronger Iran."

== Career ==
=== Political activism ===
According to his biography on The Huffington Post, Gonzalez has worked on several political campaigns, as co-founder and political director of Latinos for America, and in 2004 as a staffer on Governor Howard Dean’s presidential campaign in Iowa and New Mexico. A recent blog entry by Gonzalez, titled "On Iraq and Iran, Obama Seems to Get It," suggests a degree of support for the foreign policy of Democratic presidential candidate Barack Obama.

=== Iran nuclear program ===
In response to the December 2007 National Intelligence Estimate, which claimed that Iran had halted its secret nuclear weapons program in 2003, Gonzalez stated the following:

The discussion surrounding the NIE is in many ways a distraction. We're back to the days when we were asking, "Does Saddam have WMD or not?" We rarely asked those days how exactly those WMDs would affect our security in practical terms, or whether they were worth throwing the relative balance of power that existed in the [Persian] Gulf out the window.

With Iran, we need to focus on our shared interests. It is no secret that Iran is one of the few countries in the Middle East that actually wants the government of Iraq, and the majority Shia rule it represents, to succeed. Stabilizing Iraq and Afghanistan cannot happen without the active help of Iran, so our focus should be on sitting down and talking to Iran so our troops can come home and our security situation can improve. As we've experienced with the recent breakthroughs in North Korea, diplomacy can make even the most advanced nuclear weapons program a reversible one.

In general, Gonzalez plays down the risk of Iranian nuclear weapons. In a speech before the World Affairs Council of Sacramento, he said: "A lot of anti-Semitic claims that have been made by Iranian President Ahmadinejad scare the crap out of some people. Understandable… But we have to understand that Israel has a nuclear deterrent and Israel sits on Muslim holy ground... no fanatic is going to try to destroy Jerusalem with nuclear weapons. Certainly no ‘fanatic’ from the Islamic Republic of Iran, who has a mansion or owns a luxury condo and wants regime survival..."

Gonzalez lays out his case for diplomatic engagement and normalization of relations with Iran through two concepts: Iran's "trajectory of independence," and the Iranian regime's "cult of anti-Americanism."

=== Trajectory of independence ===
Gonzalez perceives Iran's modern popular movements, including the 1978-1979 Revolution, as part of a two-pronged trend toward independence from foreign intervention on the one hand, and "independence from unjust rulers" on the other. According to Gonzalez, the phenomenon comprises "roughly the last one and a half centuries of Iranian modern history. This trajectory has led Iran to violently release itself from the shackles of foreign intervention, and has put Iran closer to homegrown democracy than any nation in the neighboring Arab world." According to Gonzalez, the first part of the trajectory (seeking independence from foreign influence) has been achieved, but at the expense of the second goal, that of ridding Iran of autocratic rulers. He considers the trajectory an ongoing phenomenon that will likely lead Iran toward greater freedoms, as long as it is unimpeded by outside powers.

=== Cult of anti-Americanism ===
According to Gonzalez, Iran's post-1979 expressions of anti Western sentiment have been part of a "cult of anti-Americanism" that Ayatollah Khomeini put forth as "a regime identifier, using extremism to tell his supporters from his detractors. Much like being a member of the Communist Party in China, taking an anti-American or pro-theocracy line in Iran has served as a calling card to show one's allegiance to Khomeini and the revolution." He goes on to write that the cult of anti-Americanism "continues to serve as a sign of regime affiliation, rather a literal declaration of the regime's foreign policy." Gonzalez writes that in contrast to the government's rhetoric, Iran "has one of the most U.S.-friendly populations in the world; certainly the most pro-American in the Muslim Middle East."
