= Sergei Plekhanov =

Canadian political scientist

- Сергей Плеханов
- Born: 7 May 1946; Moscow, USSR
- Occupation: Associate Professor of Political Science

Academic background
- Education: Moscow State Institute of International Relations BA & MA
- Alma mater: Academy of Sciences of the Soviet Union PhD

Academic work
- Discipline: Political scientist
- Institutions: York University
- Main interests: Russian Politics and Foreign Policy, US-Russian relations

Sergei M. Plekhanov (Russian: Сергей Михайлович Плеханов; 7 May 1946) is a Canadian political scientist who is Associate Professor of Politics at York University in Toronto, Ontario, Canada.

== Education and career ==
Plekhanov received a B.A. and an M.A. in International Relations from the Moscow State Institute of International Relations and a Ph.D. in history from the Institute for US and Canadian Studies. From 1988 to 1993, he was a Deputy Director of the Institute for US and Canadian Studies. From 1985 to 1990, Plekhanov participated in the development of reform policies of Mikhail Gorbachev and took part in Russia's democratic movement. He has taught as a visiting professor at the University of California, Irvine, and Occidental College in (Los Angeles). His areas of interest included Russian politics and foreign policy; history of Russian communism and the Cold War; problems of post-communism; US-Russian relations; regional aspects of the crisis in Afghanistan. He is currently writing a book on the history of US-Russian relations.

From 1989 to 1991, Plekhanov served as Soviet Affairs Consultant with CBS News, and from 1991 to 1992, he was a consultant for the production of the HBO television film Stalin, starring Robert Duvall.

== Positions and published works ==
Plekhanov holds the following positions:

- Associate Professor at the Department of Politics, York University
- Director, South and Central Asia Project, York Centre for Asian Research, York University

His published works include:

- "Russia and the West: Integration and Tensions" in: J.L.Black and Michael Johns (ed.) Russia after 2012: From Putin to Medvedev to Putin: continuity, change, or revolution? New York: Routledge, 2013
- “Russia – A Resurgent Power?”, in: J.L. Black and Michael Johns (ed.) From Putin to Medvedev: Continuity or Change? Manotick: Penumbra Press, 2009
- “Communist Party of the Russian Federation”, in: Bruce Adams, Edward Lazzerini and George Rhyne (eds.). The Supplement to the Modern Encyclopedia of Russian and Soviet History, Vol.5, Academic International Press, 2005
- “Organized Crime, Business, and the Russian State”, in: Felia Allum, Renate Siebert (ed.) Organized Crime and the Challenge to Democracy. Routledge, 2003
- “Market Geopolitics: Continuity and Change in Russian Foreign Policy”, in: Lenard Cohen, Brian Job, Alexander Moens (eds.) Foreign Policy Realignment in the Age of Terror. Toronto: The Canadian Institute of Strategic Studies, 2003
- “Civil-Military Relations in Post-Soviet Russia: Rebuilding the “Battle Order”?” (with David Betz), in: Natalie Mychajlyszyn, Harald von Riekhoff (ed.) The Evolution of Civil-Military Relations in East-Central Europe and the Former Soviet Union. Westport: Greenwood Publishing Group, 2003
- “The Politics of ‘Mimicry’: The Case of Eastern Europe" (with Piotr Dutkiewicz), in: Albert Legault and Joel Sokolsky (ed.). The Soldier and the State in the Post Cold War Era. Kingston: Royal Military College of Canada, 2002
- Co-editor, with Harvey Simmons: Is Fascism History? Selected papers presented at the conference held at York University 28–29 October 1999. Toronto: Centre for International and Security Studies, York University, 2001
- "NATO Enlargement As An Issue in Russian Politics", in: Jacques Levesque (ed.) The Future of NATO: Enlargement, Russia, and European Security. Toronto: McGill-Queens University Press, 1999
- Co-author and co-editor, with John Logue and John Simmons: Transforming Russian Enterprises: From State Control to Worker Ownership. Westport: Greenwood Publishing Group, 1995
- Co-author and co-editor, with John Logue and John Simmons: Преобразование предприятий: американский опыт и российская действительность' ( "Enterprise Reform: The American Experience and the Russian Reality") - a revised and updated Russian edition of the above. Moskva, Veche-Persej, 1997)
- "Soviet Perceptions of Long-Term Western Developments, Goals and Constraints", in: Klaus Gottstein (ed.) Mutual Perceptions of Long-Term Goals. Can the United States and the Soviet Union Cooperate Permanently? Campus Verlag - Westview Press, 1991
- "Правый экстремизм и внешняя политика США" ("Right-Wing Extremism and US Foreign Policy"). Moscow: Nauka, 1987
- “Political Consciousness of Right Radicalism”, in: Eduard Batalov and Yuri Zamoshkin (ed.). Political Consciousness in the USA: Traditions and Modernity. Revised and expanded edition. Moscow: Progress Publishers, 1984
