= Scott Straus =

American political scientist

Scott Straus (born May 9, 1970) is an American political scientist currently serving as a professor of political science at the University of California, Berkeley. Strauss received a BA in English from Dartmouth College and a PhD in political science from the University of California, Berkeley. His research focuses on genocide, violence, human rights and African politics. He was previously a freelance journalist based in Africa, and in 2000 was a visiting fellow at Institut d'Études Politiques de Paris. He is the 2018 winner of the Grawemeyer Award for Ideas for Improving World Order for his book Making and Unmaking Nations: War, Leadership, and Genocide in Modern Africa.

Straus is author of The Order of Genocide: Race, Power, and War in Rwanda (Cornell University Press, 2006), which won the 2006 Award for Excellence in Political Science and Government from the Professional and Scholarly Publishing Division of the Association of American Publishers, an honorable mention in the African Studies Association's 2007 Melville J. Herskovits Award, and Choice magazine's Outstanding Academic Title award for 2007. Among his other books are Africa's Stalled Development: International Causes and Cures, co-authored with David K. Leonard (Lynne Rienner, 2003), and Intimate Enemy: Images and Voices of the Rwandan Genocide, in collaboration with photographer Robert Lyons (MIT Press/Zone Books, 2006). In 2016, the U.S. Holocaust Memorial Museum published his Fundamentals of Genocide and Mass Atrocity Prevention. He also translated The Great Lakes of Africa: Two Thousand Years of History by the French historian Jean-Pierre Chrétien into English (MIT Press/Zone Books, 2003). He has also co-edited Remaking Rwanda, State Building and Human Rights after Mass Violence with Lars Waldorf.
