= Gemma Romanyà i Valls =

Spanish Catalan businesswoman and graphic arts patron (1945-2018)

- Born: 29 September 1945; Capellades, Catalonia, Spain.
- Died: 5 March 2018 (aged 72); Capellades, Spain
- Occupations: Businesswoman, printer and arts patron
- Spouse: Miquel Pujol i Palol

Gemma Romanyà i Valls (29 September 1945 – 5 March 2018), was a Spanish Catalan businesswoman and graphic arts patron. Married with Miquel Pujol i Palol, she was originally from Capellades, Anoia, and since 1973 she directed the printing press Romanyà Valls SA, based in Capellades and the La Torre de Claramunt.

Since 1988, she has sponsored some chamber concerts presented, in a careful program, under the generic title of Capellades Paper of Music and international course of music of Cambra (Concurs Paper de Música de Capellades i Curs Internacional de Música de Cambra), an annual contest for the promotion of young interpreters. Therefore, in 1998, she received one of the Premis D'Actuació Civic of the Lluís Meowa Foundation. She was also a promoter and disseminator in Capellades of Eurocongrés 2000.

She collaborated in the edition of the albums recorded by the orchestra Ensemble XXI and also gave to these her study for the recording of them. So in the course 2010-11 was invited to honor the concert of presentation of the CD summer postcards that was part of the program of five concerts celebrated by Ensemble XXI on the occasion of its tenth anniversary.
