= Moses ben Abraham of Pontoise =

Moses ben Abraham of Pontoise (12th century) was a French tosafist.

Moses was a disciple of Jacob Tam. In Tam's Sefer haYashar, a number of problems of Talmudic interpretation are posed to him by Moses. They became a standard part of the tosafot. In one, it is learned that Moses' brother let a convert live in his house and later partnered with him in business. Later tosafists also cite Moses in their commentaries on the Torah. Samson of Sens cites his commentary on the Mishnah. In the 16th century, Hayim ben Bezalel claimed to have a copy of this work. Moses also wrote liturgical poems. One, only two-lines long, is preserved in the Azharot of Elijah ben Menahem HaZaken.

== Bibliography ==
- Schechter, Solomon; Broydé, Isaac (1905). "Moses ben Abraham of Pontoise". In Singer, Isidore; et al. (eds.). The Jewish Encyclopedia. Vol. 9. New York: Funk & Wagnalls. p. 62.
- Ta-Shma, Israel Moses (2007). "Moses ben Abraham of Pontoise". In Berenbaum, Michael; Skolnik, Fred (eds.). Encyclopaedia Judaica. Vol. 14 (2nd ed.). Detroit: Macmillan Reference. pp. 547–548. ISBN 978-0-02-866097-4.
- Tartakoff, Paola (2020). Conversion, Circumcision, and Ritual Murder in Medieval Europe. University of Pennsylvania Press.
