= Pontoise =

Subprefecture and commune in Île-de-France, France

- Prefecture and commune
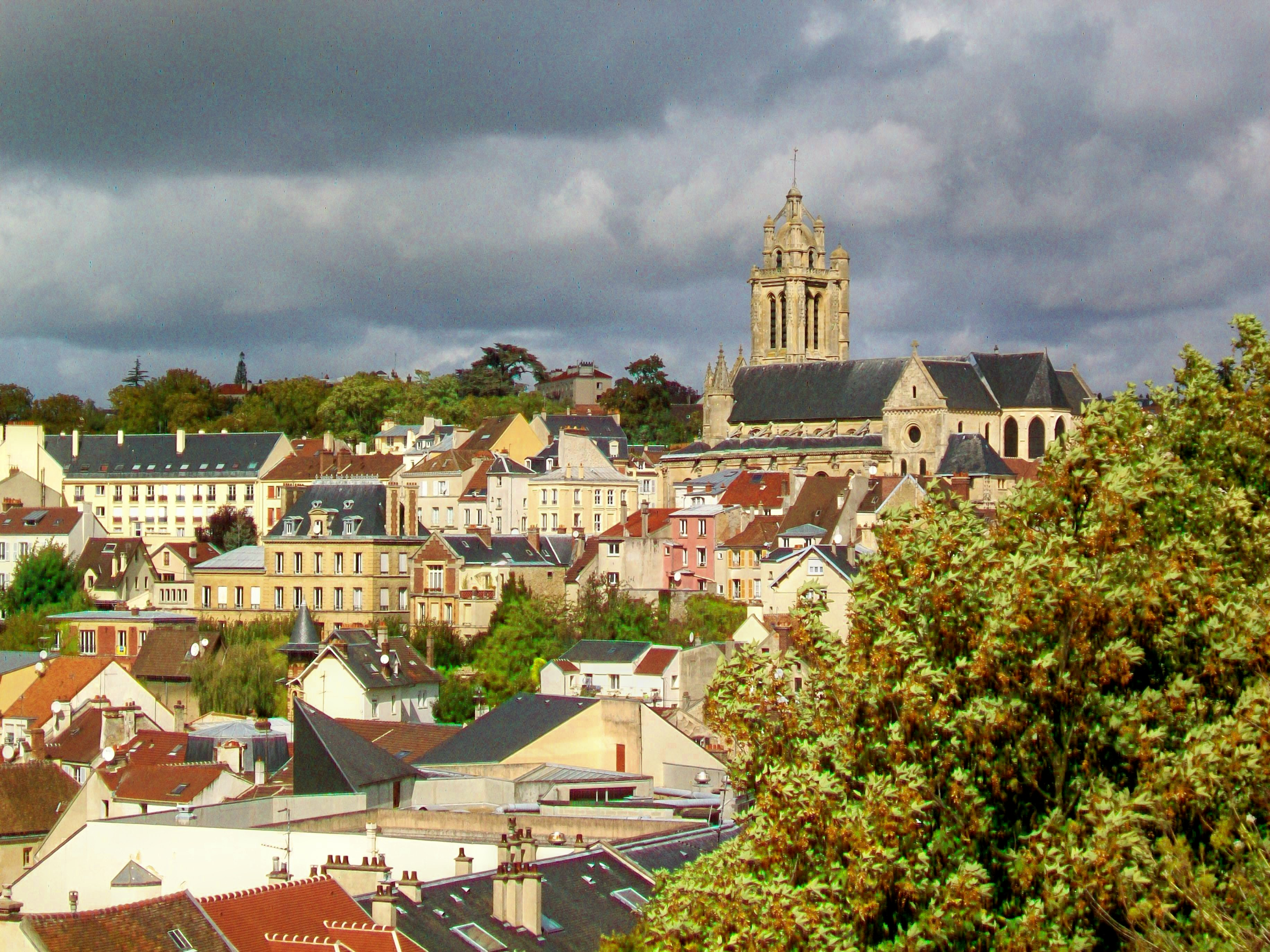
- A view of the cathedral of Saint-Maclou, from the Garden of Five Senses, on the promontory of the castle

- Coat of arms

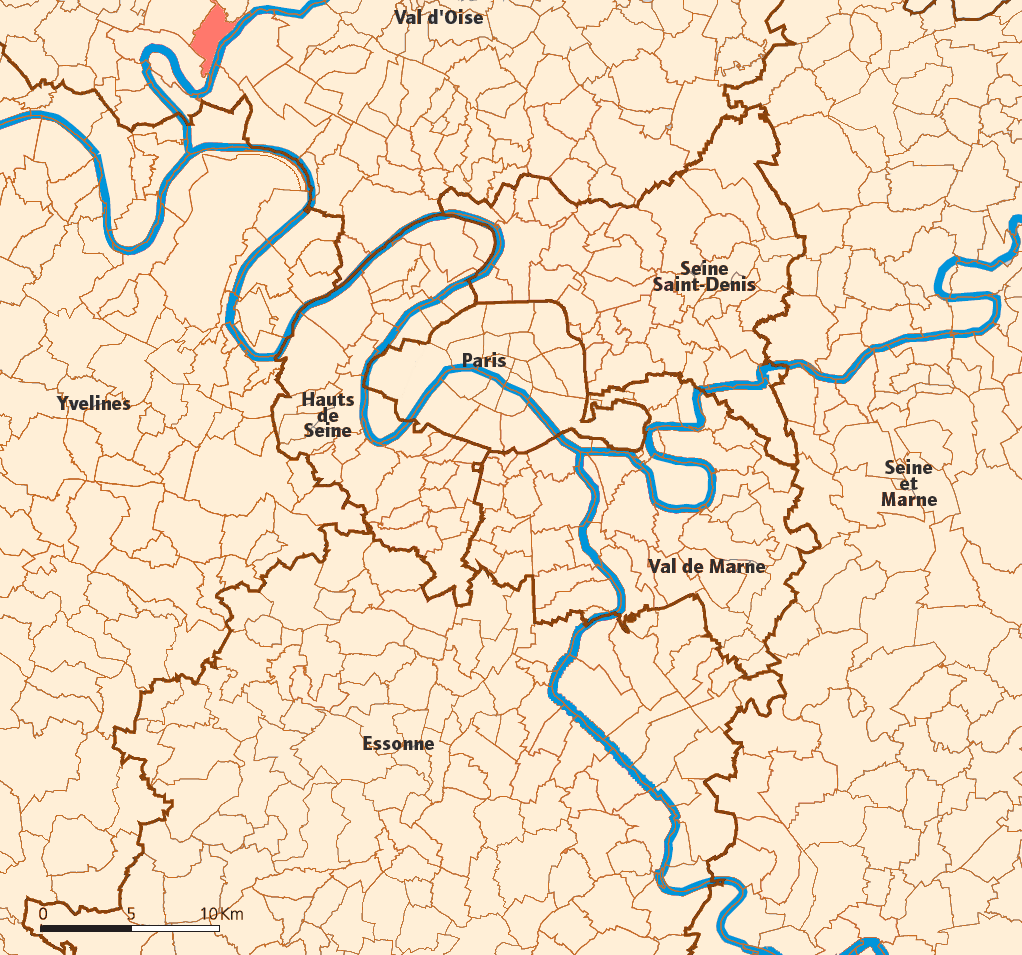
- Location (in red) within Paris inner and outer suburbs
- Location of Pontoise
- Location within France Location within Île-de-France (region)
- Coordinates: 49°03′06″N 2°06′06″E
- Country: France
- Region: Île-de-France
- Department: Val-d'Oise
- Arrondissement: Pontoise
- Canton: Pontoise
- Intercommunality: Cergy-Pontoise

Government
  - Mayor (2020–2026): Stéphanie Von Euw
- Area^{1}: 7.15 km^{2} (2.76 sq mi)
- Elevation: 27 m (89 ft)
- Highest elevation: 87 m (285 ft)
- Lowest elevation: 22 m (72 ft)
- Population (2023): 32,405
  - Density: 4,530/km^{2} (11,700/sq mi)
- Time zone: UTC+01:00 (CET)
  - Summer (DST): UTC+02:00 (CEST)
- INSEE/Postal code: 95500 /00000
- ^{1} French Land Register data, which excludes lakes, ponds, glaciers > 1 km^{2} (0.386 sq mi or 247 acres) and river estuaries.

Pontoise (French pronunciation: [pɔ̃twaz]) is a commune north of Paris, France. It is located 28.4 km (17.6 mi) from the centre of Paris, in the "new town" of Cergy-Pontoise.

== Administration ==
Pontoise is the official préfecture (capital) of the Val-d'Oise département, although the préfecture building and administration, as well as the department council (conseil général), are located in the neighboring commune of Cergy.

Pontoise is also the seat of the Arrondissement of Pontoise. The sous-préfecture building and administration, unlike the préfecture, are located inside the commune of Pontoise.

=== Sister cities ===
The city of Pontoise has three sister city relationships with:

- Böblingen, Germany since 1956
- Sevenoaks, United Kingdom since 1964
- Geleen, Netherlands since 1962

== Security ==
Known for being a violent city in the late 20th century, with a criminal rate of 137.62 incidents per 1000 inhabitants, Cergy-Pontoise has enjoyed a significant decrease in violence in the first decade of the 21st century. By 2008, the rate had declined to 99.87, although this is still considered high. That rate has continued to decline in the second decade.

== History ==
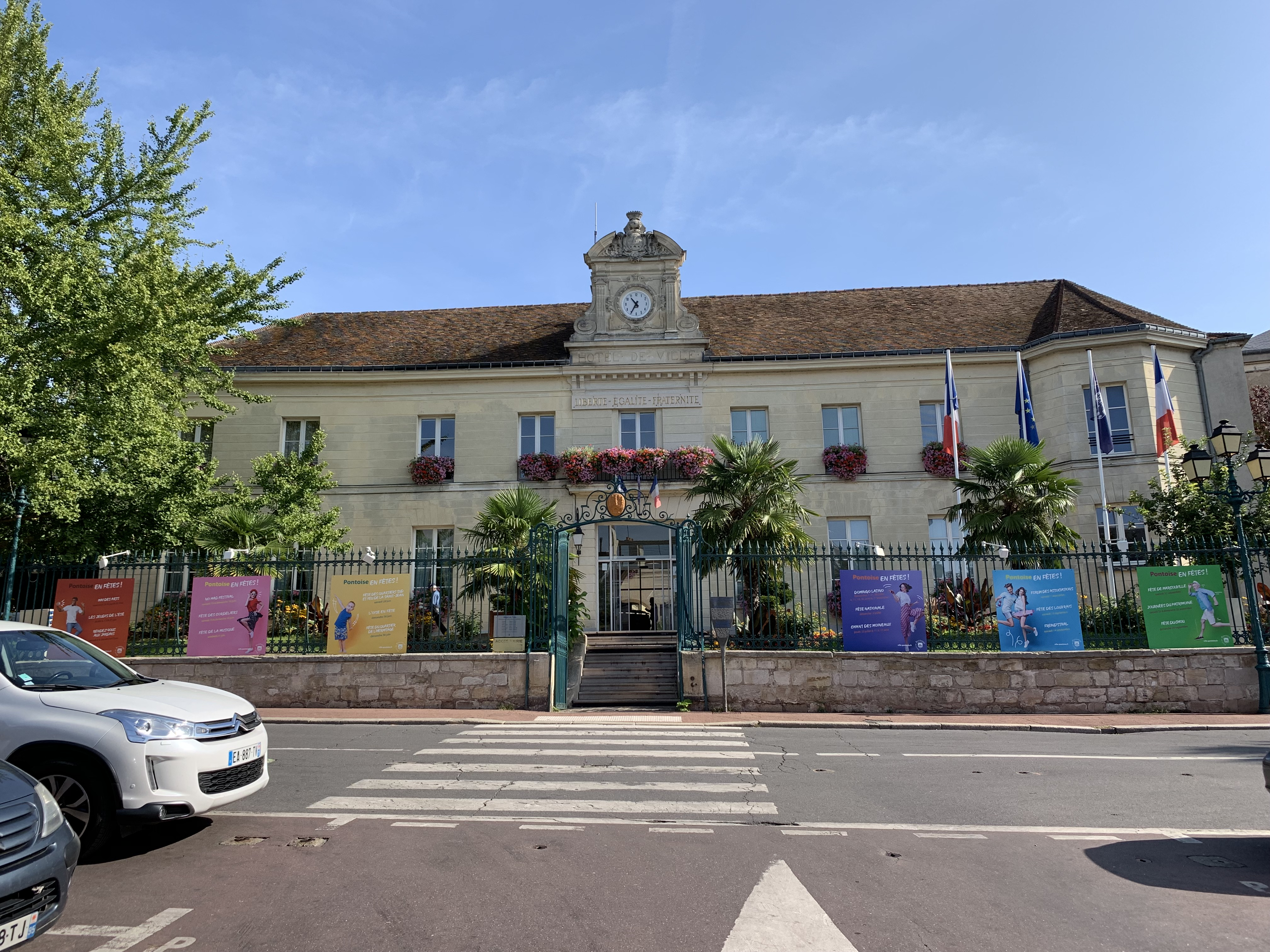
The Hôtel de Ville

Pontoise is the historical capital of the Vexin français. Its foundation dates from Roman times (Pontisara). At that time, the rock peak overhanging the river Oise supported the defense of the fort which was on the Roman road, the Chaussée Jules César, between Lutetia (Paris) and Rotomagus (Rouen). The road still exists and is now part of the N14 from Paris to Rouen. It is also known to many people as the birthplace of the alchemist Nicholas Flamel. With an over 2,000 year legacy, Pontoise still has vestiges of the past, such as medieval lanes, convents, churches and museums, and was awarded the "City of Art and History Label" in 2006. The impressionist painter Camille Pissarro made it famous through many paintings which are present nowadays in the most famous art galleries in the world.

The Hôtel de Ville was completed in around 1860.

== Climate ==
Pontoise has an oceanic climate (Köppen climate classification Cfb). The average annual temperature in Pontoise is 12.5 °C (54.5 °F). The average annual rainfall is 666.7 mm (26.25 in) with December as the wettest month. The temperatures are highest on average in July, at around 20.5 °C (68.9 °F), and lowest in January, at around 5.3 °C (41.5 °F). The highest temperature ever recorded in Pontoise was 40.0 °C (104.0 °F) on 1 July 2015; the coldest temperature ever recorded was −12.5 °C (9.5 °F) on 1 January 1997.

Climate data for Pontoise (1991−2020 normals, extremes 1990−2020)
Month	Jan	Feb	Mar	Apr	May	Jun	Jul	Aug	Sep	Oct	Nov	Dec	Year
Record high °C (°F)	16.7 (62.1)	21.5 (70.7)	25.8 (78.4)	29.8 (85.6)	32.9 (91.2)	39.7 (103.5)	40.0 (104.0)	40.0 (104.0)	36.0 (96.8)	31.1 (88.0)	22.0 (71.6)	17.5 (63.5)	40.0 (104.0)
Mean daily maximum °C (°F)	7.8 (46.0)	9.1 (48.4)	13.1 (55.6)	16.9 (62.4)	20.5 (68.9)	23.8 (74.8)	26.1 (79.0)	26.2 (79.2)	22.2 (72.0)	17.0 (62.6)	11.5 (52.7)	8.2 (46.8)	16.9 (62.4)
Daily mean °C (°F)	5.3 (41.5)	5.8 (42.4)	8.8 (47.8)	11.7 (53.1)	15.2 (59.4)	18.4 (65.1)	20.5 (68.9)	20.4 (68.7)	16.9 (62.4)	13.0 (55.4)	8.5 (47.3)	5.7 (42.3)	12.5 (54.5)
Mean daily minimum °C (°F)	2.7 (36.9)	2.6 (36.7)	4.5 (40.1)	6.4 (43.5)	9.8 (49.6)	13.0 (55.4)	14.9 (58.8)	14.7 (58.5)	11.7 (53.1)	9.1 (48.4)	5.6 (42.1)	3.3 (37.9)	8.2 (46.8)
Record low °C (°F)	−12.5 (9.5)	−12.3 (9.9)	−8.1 (17.4)	−2.4 (27.7)	−0.5 (31.1)	1.8 (35.2)	6.0 (42.8)	5.6 (42.1)	0.0 (32.0)	−3.6 (25.5)	−10.0 (14.0)	−10.4 (13.3)	−12.5 (9.5)
Average precipitation mm (inches)	57.9 (2.28)	52.1 (2.05)	49.4 (1.94)	45.4 (1.79)	62.2 (2.45)	53.5 (2.11)	49.0 (1.93)	52.9 (2.08)	46.3 (1.82)	63.9 (2.52)	59.0 (2.32)	75.1 (2.96)	666.7 (26.25)
Average precipitation days (≥ 1.0 mm)	10.6	10.2	9.5	8.8	9.2	8.8	7.4	8.2	7.9	10.4	11.1	12.4	114.6
Source: Météo-France

== Demographics ==
Historical population

Year	Pop.	±% p.a.
1793	4,891	—
1800	5,174	+0.81%
1806	5,161	−0.04%
1821	5,339	+0.23%
1831	5,458	+0.22%
1836	5,408	−0.18%
1841	5,419	+0.04%
1846	5,488	+0.25%
1851	5,637	+0.54%
1856	5,609	−0.10%
1861	6,065	+1.58%
1866	6,287	+0.72%
1872	6,480	+0.51%
1876	6,412	−0.26%
1881	6,675	+0.81%
1886	7,192	+1.50%
1891	7,422	+0.63%
1896	7,992	+1.49%
1901	8,180	+0.47%

Year	Pop.	±% p.a.
1906	8,492	+0.75%
1911	9,023	+1.22%
1921	9,915	+0.95%
1926	10,719	+1.57%
1931	11,709	+1.78%
1936	12,183	+0.80%
1946	11,009	−1.01%
1954	14,139	+3.18%
1962	15,232	+0.94%
1968	16,817	+1.66%
1975	26,014	+6.43%
1982	26,780	+0.42%
1990	27,150	+0.17%
1999	27,494	+0.14%
2007	29,148	+0.73%
2012	30,164	+0.69%
2017	30,767	+0.40%
2023	31,970	+0.64%

Source: EHESS and INSEE (1968-2023)

=== Immigration ===
Place of birth of residents of Pontoise in 1999
Born in metropolitan France	Born outside metropolitan France			
68.2%	31.8%			
68.2%	Born in overseas France	Born in foreign countries with French citizenship at birth^{1}	EU-15 immigrants^{2}	Non-EU-15 immigrants
68.2%	4.8%	3.4%	1.9%	21.7%
^{1} This group is made up largely of former French settlers, such as pieds-noirs in Northwest Africa, followed by former colonial citizens who had French citizenship at birth (such as was often the case for the native elite in French colonies), as well as to a lesser extent foreign-born children of French expatriates. A foreign country is understood as a country not part of France in 1999, so a person born for example in 1950 in Algeria, when Algeria was an integral part of France, is nonetheless listed as a person born in a foreign country in French statistics.^{2} An immigrant is a person born in a foreign country not having French citizenship at birth. An immigrant may have acquired French citizenship since moving to France, but is still considered an immigrant in French statistics. On the other hand, persons born in France with foreign citizenship (the children of immigrants) are not listed as immigrants.

== Transport ==
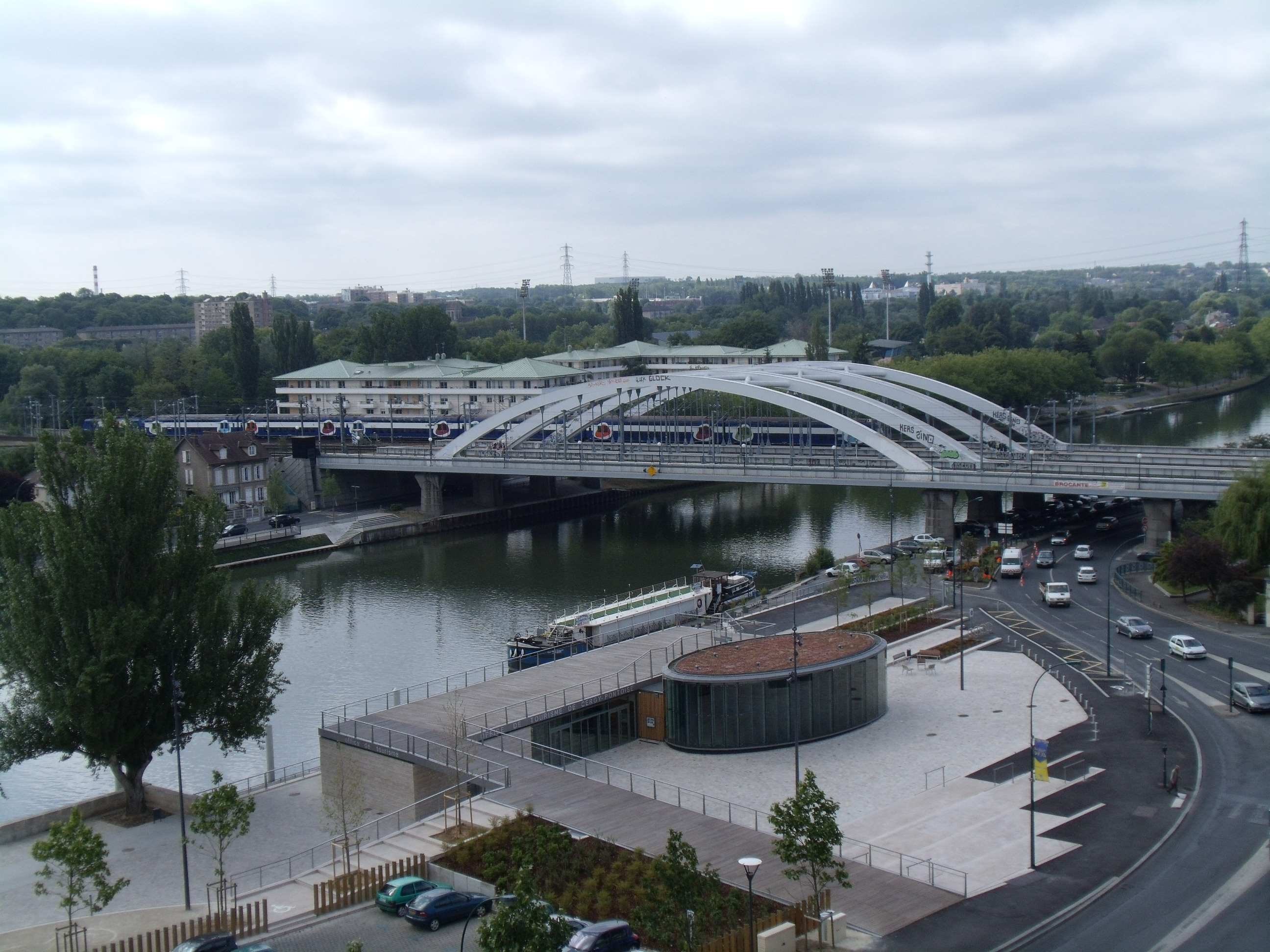
The railway bridge between Pontoise and Saint-Ouen-l'Aumone

Pontoise is served by Pontoise station, a terminus on Paris RER line C and an intermediate terminus for suburban trains originating from Gare Saint-Lazare as well as a terminus for suburban trains from Gare du Nord. Some trains originating at Gare Saint-Lazare continue onto Gisors. For bus services, Stivo (formerly Services des Transports de l'Agglomération Nouvelle) operates within the new town of Cergy-Pontoise, and in and around Pontoise, with transport interchanges situated Place Charles de Gaulle and Parking Canrobert.

Pontoise – Cormeilles Aerodrome is the area airport.

== Education ==
Public preschool through elementary schools include:

- Seven preschools ('maternelles): des Cordeliers, Eugène-Ducher, de l'Hermitage, Laris, Ludovic-Piette, Jean-Moulin, Parc-aux-Charettes
- Two primary schools: École primaire Gustave-Loiseau and École primaire des Maradas
- Seven elementary schools (élémentaires): Paul-Cézanne, Eugène-Ducher, de l'Hermitage, des Larris, Jean-Moulin, Ludovic-Piette, Parc-aux-Charrettes

Public senior high schools/sixth-form colleges:

- Lycée Camille Pissarro Pontoise
- Lycée Alfred Kastler de Cergy-Pontoise, in Pontoise, also serves Cergy

There are also six private schools: École Saint-Martin-de-France (up to senior high school), École "Ella", École Saint-Louis, Établissement Vauban, Notre-Dame-de-la-Compassion (junior and senior high school)

== Culture ==
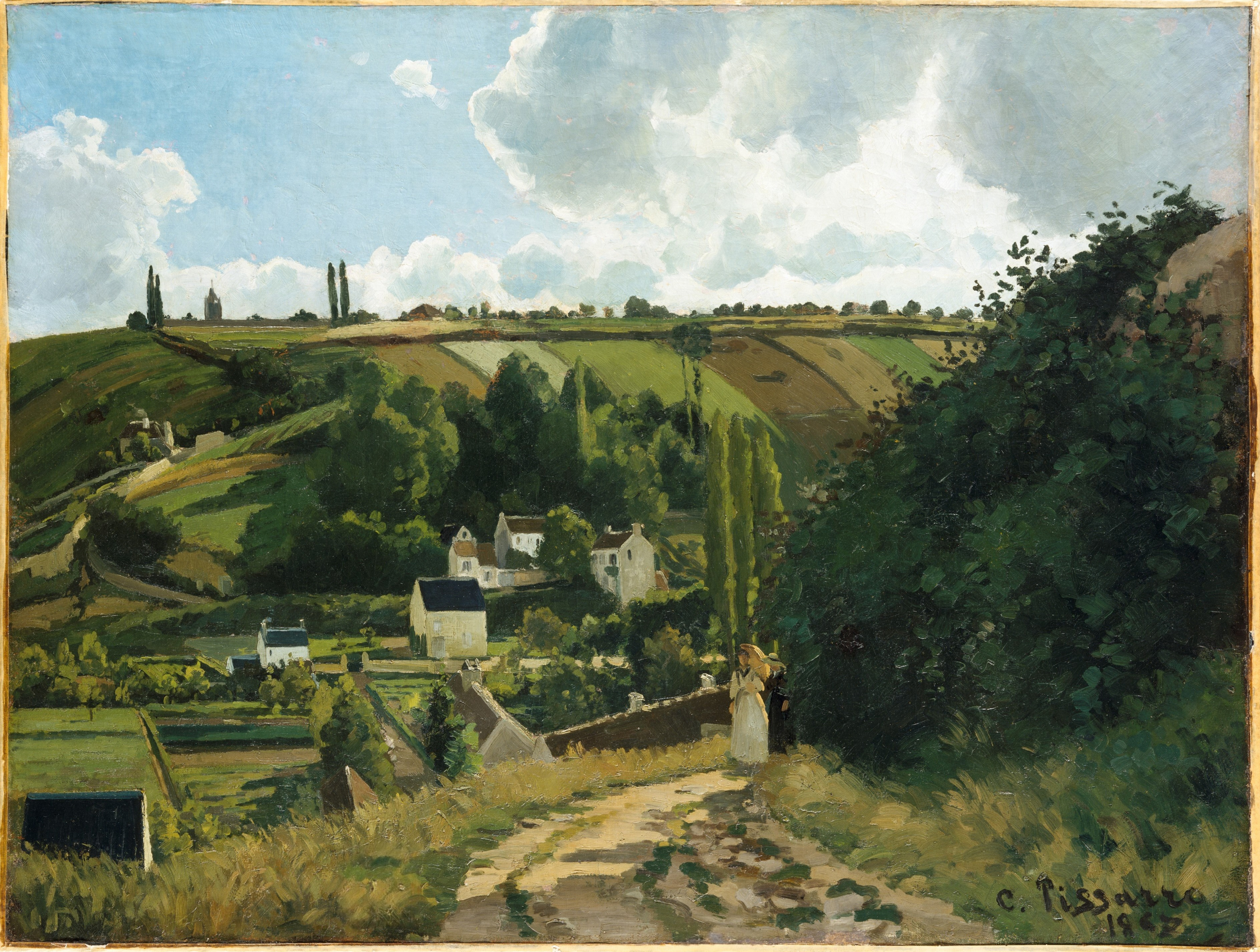
Camille Pissarro Jalais Hill, Pontoise

Pontoise is one of the capitals of the impressionist movement. Many painters took as a starting point the city and its area for the creation of landscapes. Camille Pissarro lived there for seventeen years. Other artists lived or worked in the area such as Vincent van Gogh (Auvers-sur-Oise), Paul Cézanne, Paul Gauguin, Charles-François Daubigny, Gustave Caillebotte, Gustave Loiseau, etc.

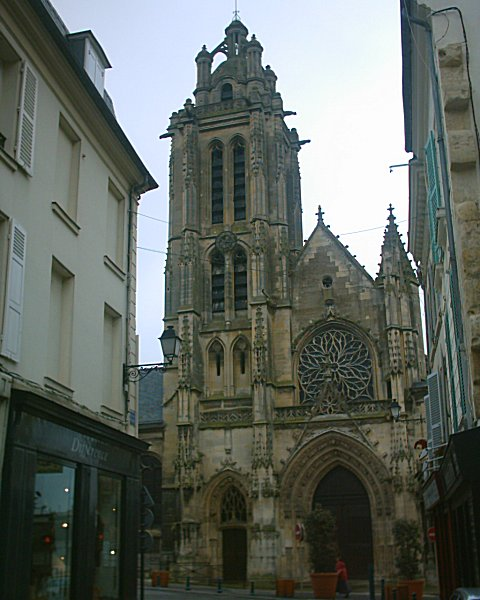
Cathédrale Saint Maclou

== Main sights ==
- Cathédrale Saint-Maclou de Pontoise. It was built in the 12th century and reconstructed and enlarged in the 15th and 16th centuries. The tower, as well as the central portal, is in flamboyant style. The central body is flanked by Renaissance additions. The remaining 12th century part of the cathedral is to the back. To the North of the building is a Renaissance portal.
- Musée de Pontoise (Musée Tavet-Delacour). The museum houses sculptures from the Middle Ages, manuscripts from the seventeenth century and paintings from the twentieth century
- Musée Pissarro (Impressionist collections) and garden of the five senses. The Museum is situated in a bourgeois house at the entrance of the old castle.

== Parks and recreation ==
Parks:

- Le Jardin de la Ville
- Le Parc des Larris
- Le jardin partagé de Marcouville
- Le Jardin des Cinq Sens
- Le Parc du Château de Marcouville
- Les jardins et la terrasse basse du Dôme
- Le Jardin des Lavandières
- Plaines de jeux

== Notable people ==
- Rabbi Moses ben Abraham of Pontoise, 12th-century disciple of Rabbeinu Tam and mentioned in several Tosafot.
- Sébastien Carole (b. 1982), footballer
- Yarouba Cissako, footballer
- Koumba Cisse, handball player
- Moussa Dembélé, footballer
- Erwan Kepoa Falé, actor
- Nicolas Flamel (c. 1340-1418), reputed alchemist, probably born here
- Pierre Fontaine (1762-1853), French neoclassical architect
- Amine Harit, Moroccan footballer
- Jérémy Labor (b. 1992), footballer
- Christophe Lebon (b. 1982), swimmer
- Luc Loubaki, basketball player
- Blessed Marie de l'Incarnation (1566-1618), foundress of the Reformed Carmelites in France.
- Édouard-Alfred Martel (1859-1938), Father of modern speleology
- Guiday Mendy (b. 1986), basketball player
- Aly Ndom, footballer
- Camille Pissarro, painter
- Yoann Rapinier, athlete
- Yacine Qasmi, Moroccan footballer
- Liza del Sierra, pornographic actress.
- Raymond Turpin (1895–1988), paediatrician who identified trisomy-21
- Jacques Vallée, author, ufologist and former astronomer
- Jean-Éric Vergne, former Formula One driver currently competing in Formula E
- St William of Pontoise, hermit

== See also ==
- Communes of the Val-d'Oise department
