= Monzón Cathedral =

Church in Monzón, Spain

Coordinates: 41.9103°N 0.1944°E

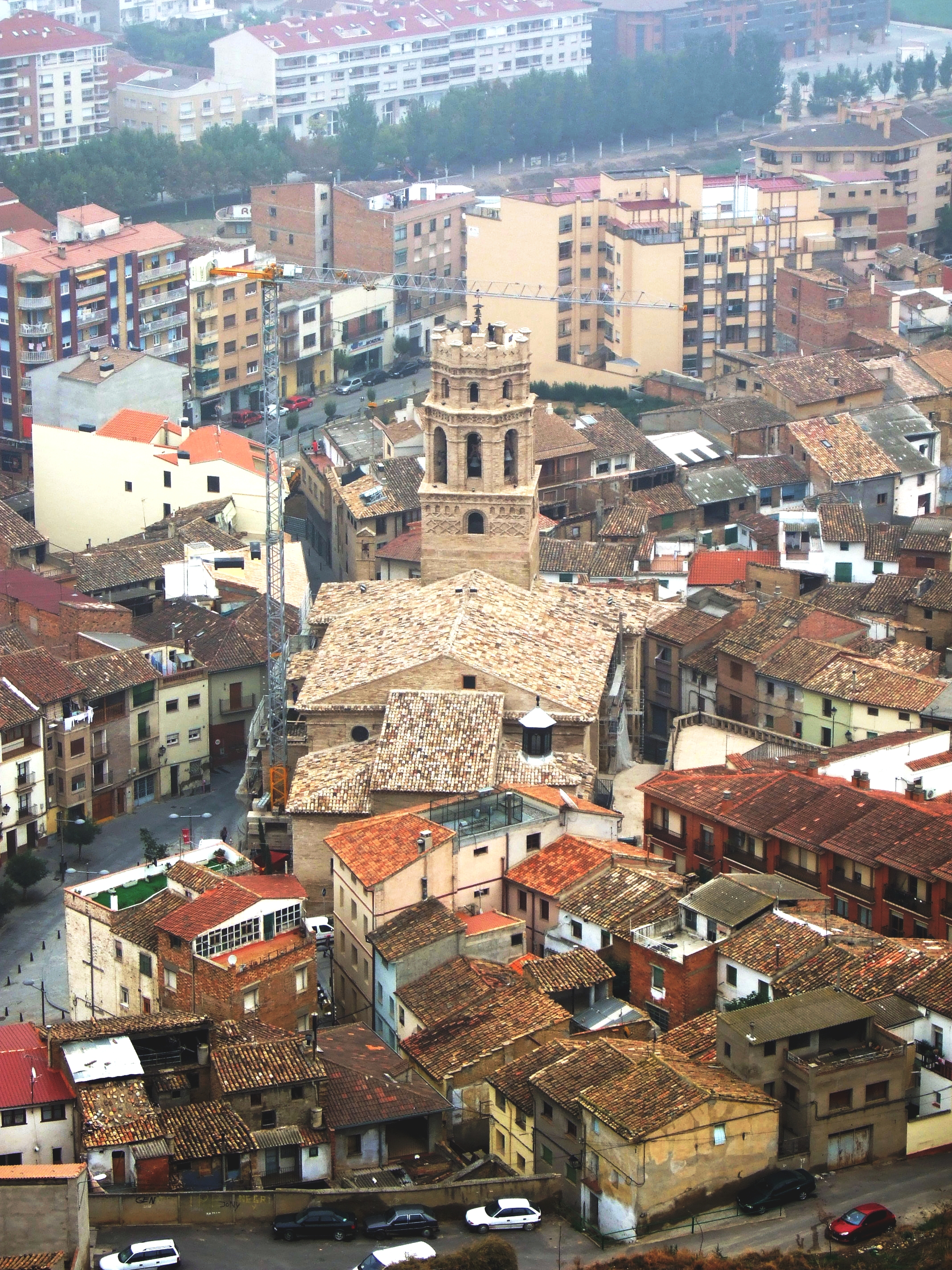
Aerial view of the Cathedral of Monzón

The Cathedral of Monzón (Catedral de Santa María del Romeral) is a Roman Catholic church located in the town of Monzón in the province of Huesca, autonomous community of Aragon, Spain.

== History ==
Since 1995, this has been the co-cathedral of the diocese of Barbastro-Monzón, along with the Barbastro Cathedral.

The initial church was built in Romanesque style, but modified across the centuries. The apse has components of Gothic style. The church was made a collegiate church in 1607. In 1949, it was made a national monument.

== See also ==
- Catholic Church in Spain
