= Ignacio de Luzán =

Spanish critic and poet

The Most Excellent Ignacio de Luzán
- Born: Ignacio de Luzán Claramunt de Suelves y Gurrea; 28 March 1702; Zaragoza, Spain
- Died: 19 May 1754 (aged 52); Madrid, Spain

Seat E of the Real Academia Española
- In office 15 April 1751 – 19 May 1754
- Preceded by: Casimiro de Ustáriz
- Succeeded by: Javier de Aguirre

Ignacio de Luzán Claramunt de Suelves y Gurrea (March 28, 1702 – May 19, 1754) was a Spanish critic and poet.

He was born in Zaragoza. His youth was passed under the care of his uncle, and, after studying at Milan, he graduated in philosophy at the University of Catania. In 1723 he took minor orders, but abandoned his intention of entering the church and took up his residence at Naples, where he read assiduously. Business took him to Spain in 1733, living in Monzón and he became known in Madrid as a scholar with a tendency towards innovations in literature. La Poetica, 6 Reglas de la poesia en general y de sus principales especies (1737) proved that this impression was correct.

He at once took rank as the leader of the literary reformers, and his courteous determination earned him the respect of his opponents. In 1747 he was appointed secretary to the Spanish embassy in Paris and, on returning to Madrid in 1750, was elected to the Academia Poetica del Buen Gusto, where, on account of his travels, he was known by the sobriquet of El Peregrino. He became master of the mint and treasurer of the royal library. He died at Madrid, after a short illness, on May 19, 1754.

Luzán was not the pioneer of Franco-Italian theories in Spain, but he was their most powerful exponent, and his Poetica is an admirable example of destructive criticism. The defects of Lope de Vega and Calderón are indicated with vigilant severity, but on the constructive side Luzán is notably weak, for he merely proposes to substitute one exhausted convention for another. The doctrine of the dramatic unities had not the saving virtues which he ascribed to it, and, though he succeeded in banishing the older dramatists from the boards, he and his school failed to produce a single piece of more than mediocre merit.

His theories, derived chiefly from Muratori, were ineffective in practice; but their ingenuity cannot be denied, and they acted as a stimulus to the partisans of the national tradition.
