= Guiday Mendy =

French basketball player (born 1986)

Guiday Mendy (born 18 May 1986 in Pontoise) is a French basketball player who plays for Cavigal Nice of the League feminine de basket.
