= William of Pontoise =

French Roman Catholic saint

Saint William of Pontoise
- Died: 1192; Pontoise, France
- Venerated in: Roman Catholic Church
- Feast: 10 May

William of Pontoise was a Benedictine hermit. He lived at Pontoise, France.
