= Monzón =

- Municipality
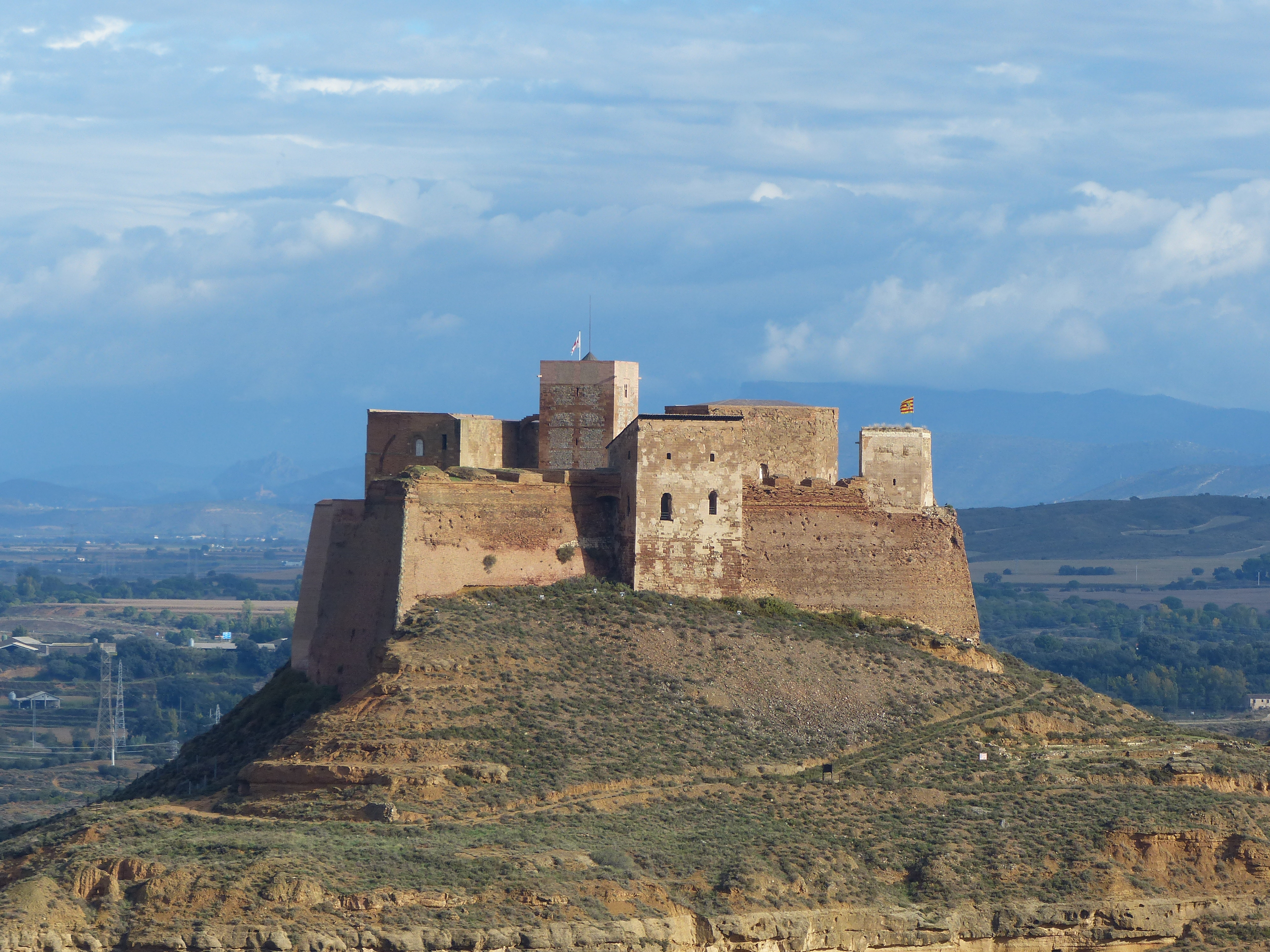
- The castle in Monzón

- Flag Coat of arms
- Motto(s): Monzón, cuna de deportistas (Monzón, the cradle of athletes)
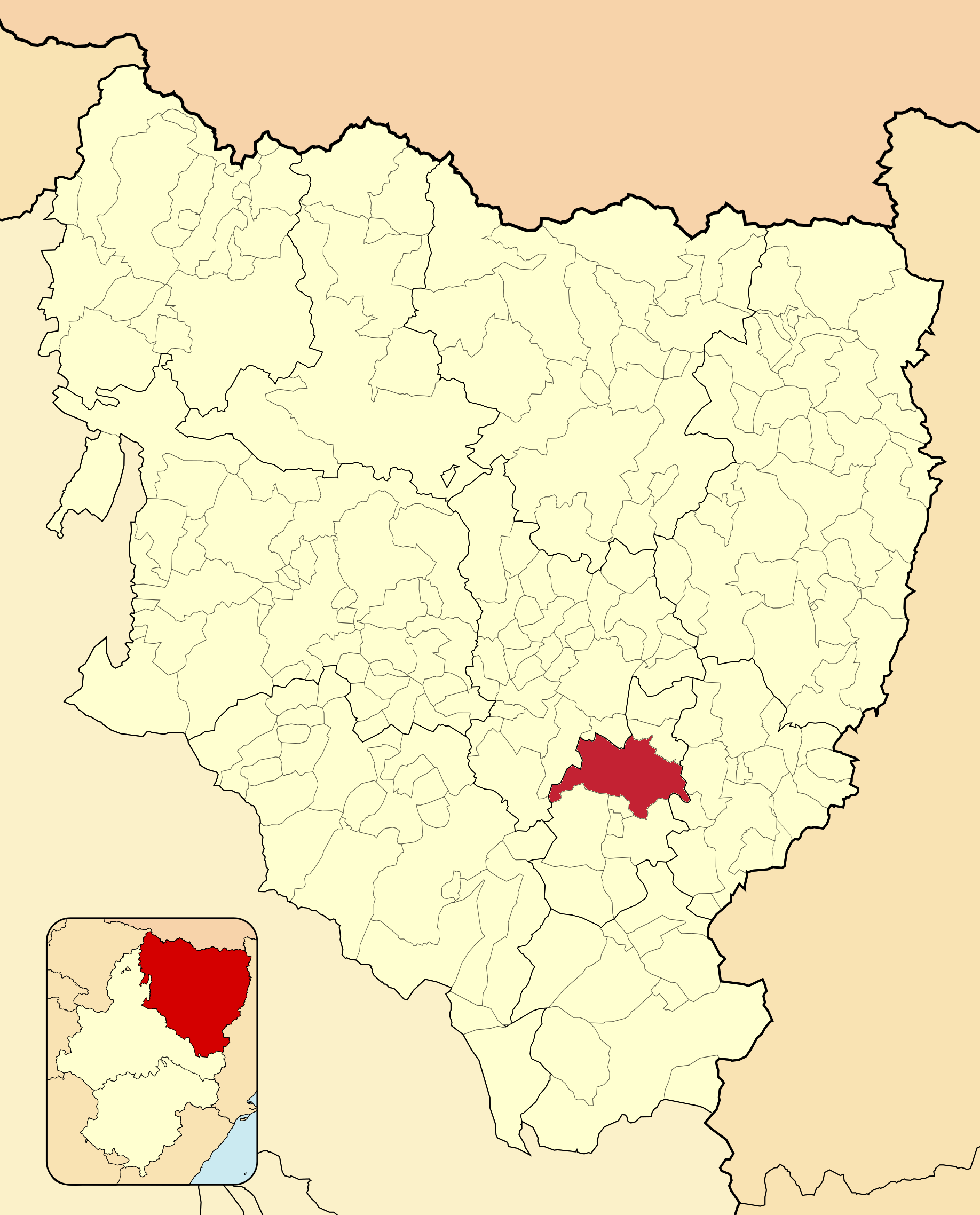
- Location in the province of Huesca

- Location in Spain Monzón (Spain)
- Coordinates: 41°54′36″N 0°11′24″E
- Country: Spain
- Autonomous community: Aragon
- Province: Huesca
- Comarca: Cinca Medio

Government
  - Alcalde: Álvaro Burrell (PSOE-Aragón)

Area
  - Total: 155.01 km^{2} (59.85 sq mi)
- Elevation: 273 m (896 ft)

Population (2025-01-01)
  - Total: 18,525
  - Density: 119.51/km^{2} (309.53/sq mi)
- Demonym: Montisonense
- Time zone: UTC+1 (CET)
  - Summer (DST): UTC+2 (CEST)
- Postal code: 22400
- Website: Official website

Monzón (Spanish: [monˈθon]) is a city and municipality in the autonomous community of Aragon, Spain. It had a population of 17,176 as of 2014. The municipality is situated at the confluence of the Cinca and Sosa rivers, within the Cinca Medio comarca of the province of Huesca.

== Historical overview ==
=== Prehistory and Classical Age ===
The earliest evidence of continuous human occupation in the area of Monzón comes from Neolithic archaeological remains found at the Sosiles Altos and Peña Lucas sites. Most traces of settlement date from the Bronze Age, when it is believed that the Ilergetes inhabited the area between the rivers Cinca, Sosa, and Clamor. The defeat of the Ilergetes in the 3rd century BC led to the Romanization of the area from the 2nd century BC onwards. Monzón became an important junction connecting the cities of Caesaraugusta and Osca with Italy. Remains of Roman dwellings have been discovered in the hills and caves near the Ermita de la Alegría (Shrine of Joy).

=== Middle Ages ===
==== Muslim Era ====
During the period of Muslim rule, Monzón was disputed between the Banu Sabrit of Huesca and the Banu Qasi of Zaragoza. In the 11th century it came under the control of the Banu Hud and was taken by El Cid in 1083. The Christian kingdoms sought to capture Monzón in order to disrupt communications between the taifa kingdoms of Zaragoza and Lleida.

The infante Peter I reconquered Monzón in 1089 during the reign of his father, Sancho Ramírez. Sancho Ramírez created the so-called Kingdom of Monzón for his son Peter, before he ascended the throne of Aragon. This arrangement lasted until 1126, when Monzón briefly returned to Muslim control. Between 1130 and 1136 it was held by Christians, who lost it again between 1136 and 1141, before regaining permanent control. In 1143 the town came under the control of the Knights Templar.

==== Christian Era ====
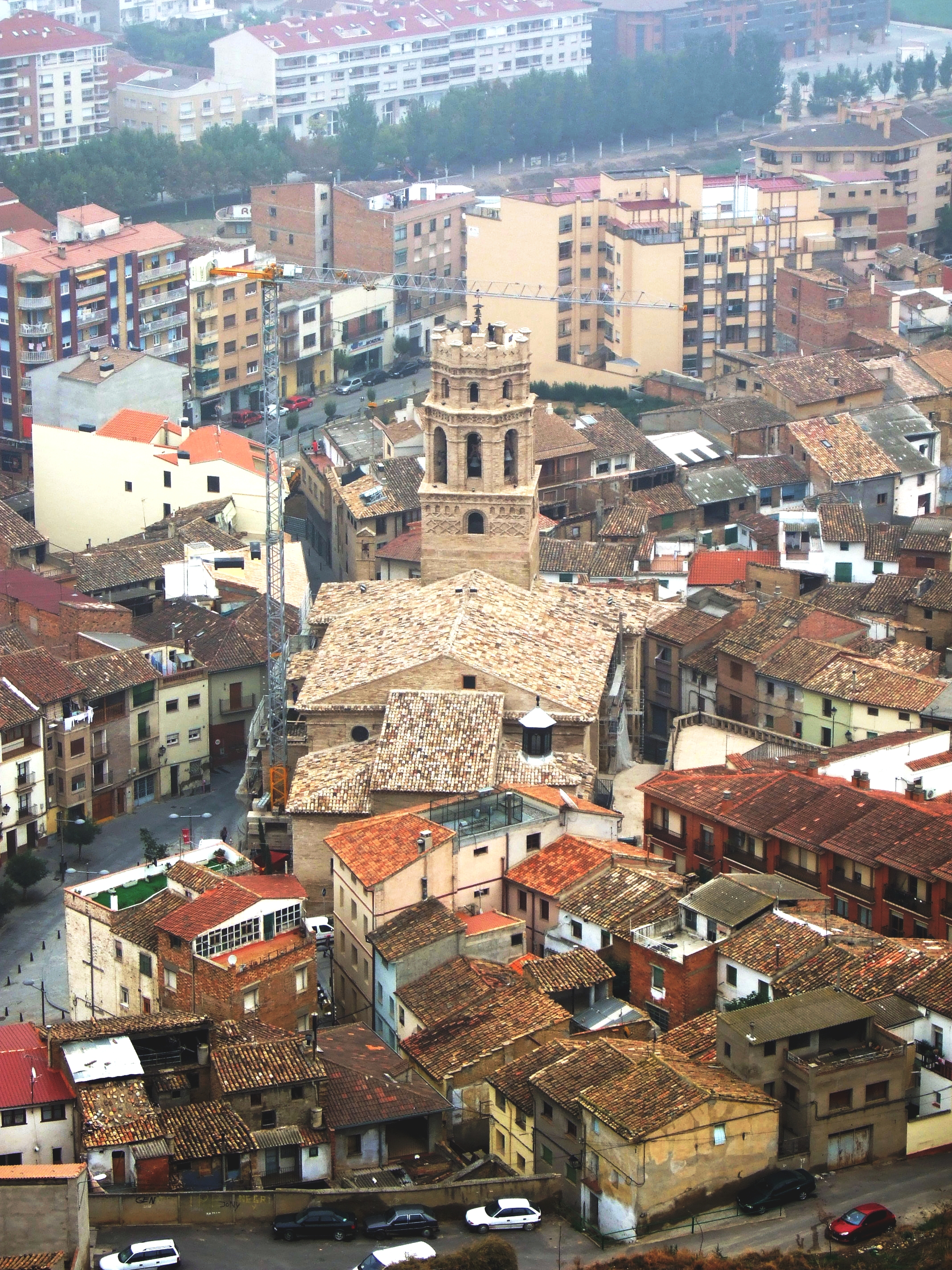
The Cathedral of Santa María del Romeral.

The Cathedral of Santa María del Romeral (Saint Mary of the Rosemary Field) developed from the 9th-century Torre del Homenaje, which hosted kings and nobles. In 1109, Urraca of Castile married her second husband, Alfonso I ("the Battler"), at Monzón despite objections from the Church concerning consanguinity.

During the Middle Ages Monzón became an important stronghold of the Knights Templar due to its strategic position between the Segre and Cinca valleys. It also served as a prominent venue for the Cortes of Aragon, particularly between the 13th and 17th centuries, due to its location between Zaragoza and Barcelona. The Teutonic Knights also maintained a commandery in Monzón from 1222.

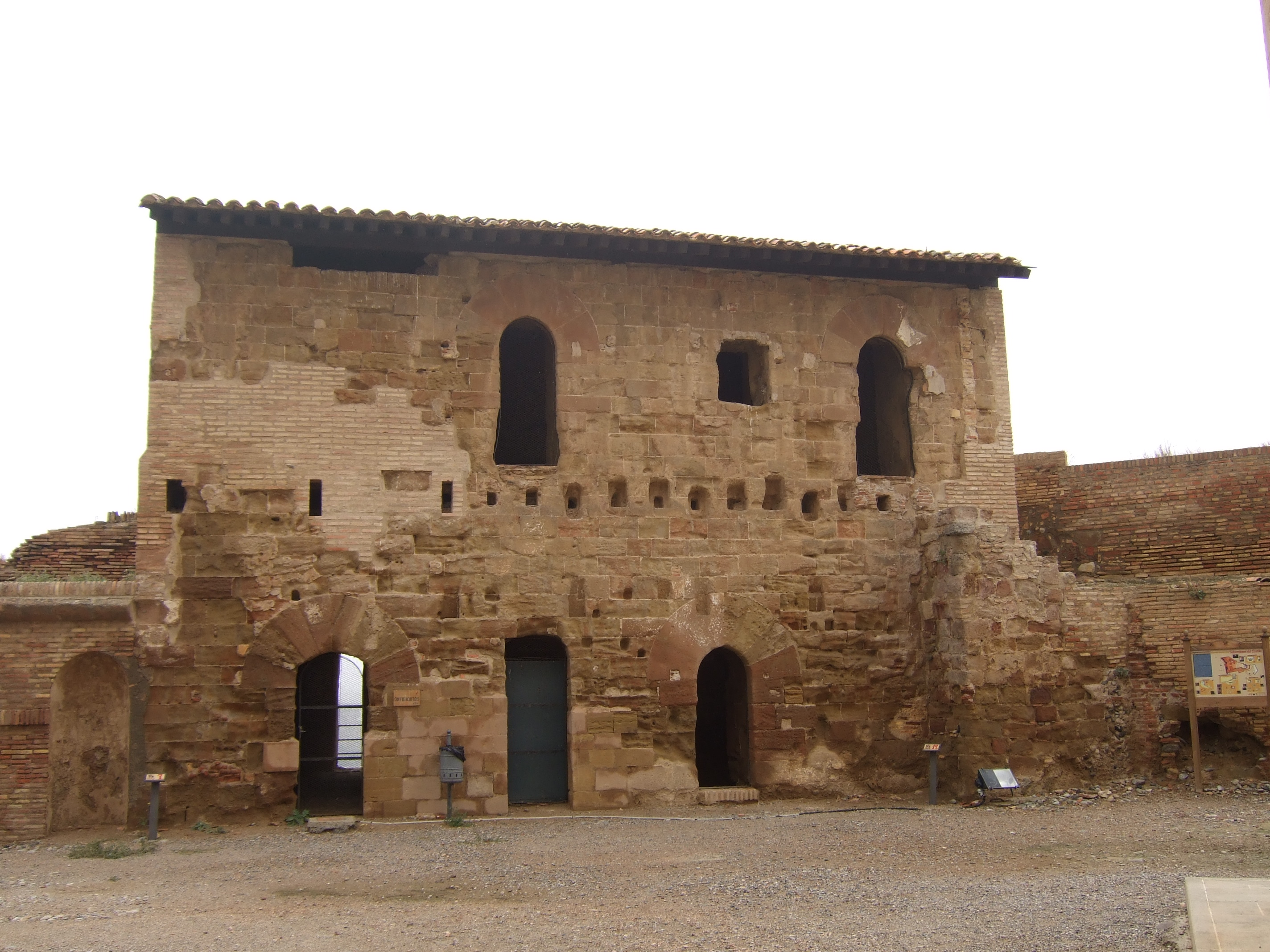
Dependencies of Monzón Castle

In the 12th century Monzón was governed at various times by the infante Ramiro Sánchez of Navarre, by Tizón, and by García Ramírez, before García's accession as King of Navarre. In 1143 the Knights Templar transferred their rights to the Crown of Aragon in exchange for possession of the Castle of Monzón and other properties, where the crown later established one of its main centres of power.

A significant event of this period was the residence of James I ("the Conqueror") in Monzón. After the death of his father, Peter II ("the Catholic"), at the Battle of Muret (1213), the Knights Templar of Monzón acted as guardians and tutors to the young king. When Pope Clement V dissolved the order in the early 14th century, Monzón resisted, but the castle was taken in 1309. In 1317 it passed to the Knights Hospitaller, although their influence gradually declined.

Between the 13th and 17th centuries, Monzón frequently hosted sessions of the Cortes of the Crown of Aragon. The Cathedral of Santa María del Romeral, with its Romanesque features, together with the castle, whose origins date to the 9th century, often accommodated the monarchs and nobility.

=== Modern and Contemporary Age ===
In 1626, Cardinal Richelieu and Gaspar de Guzmán, Count-Duke of Olivares signed the Treaty of Monzón, which ended the conflict over the Valtellina.

During the Catalan Revolt, Monzón was captured by Franco-Catalan forces under Philippe de La Mothe-Houdancourt in 1642 and retaken the following year by Castilian troops commanded by Felipe da Silva.

The Castle of Monzón, considered a strategic stronghold, was again occupied by the French during the Peninsular War. It was recaptured in 1814 by Spanish forces under General Copons, assisted by Juan Van Halen, a Spanish officer of Flemish origin who later became a lieutenant general. Van Halen had previously used similar tactics to capture Lleida and Mequinenza.

== Industry and communications ==
The industrial tradition of Monzón began in the early 20th century with the establishment of a sugar factory, which was later relocated to Jerez de la Frontera. After the Spanish Civil War, new industries were introduced, including Hidro Nitro Española (HNE), Aiscondel, Etino-Química, Polidux, and Monsanto-Aiscondel, among others. A factory producing wire, nails, and corrugated materials was also established.

This process of industrialisation was facilitated by Monzón's geographical location—approximately one and a half hours from the border and from Zaragoza—as well as by its transport connections. The town is linked by road to Zaragoza and Lleida, connected to Pamplona via the A-22, and served by a railway line that provides access to Barcelona, northern Spain, Zaragoza, and Lleida, where it connects with the AVE high-speed rail network.

== Culture ==
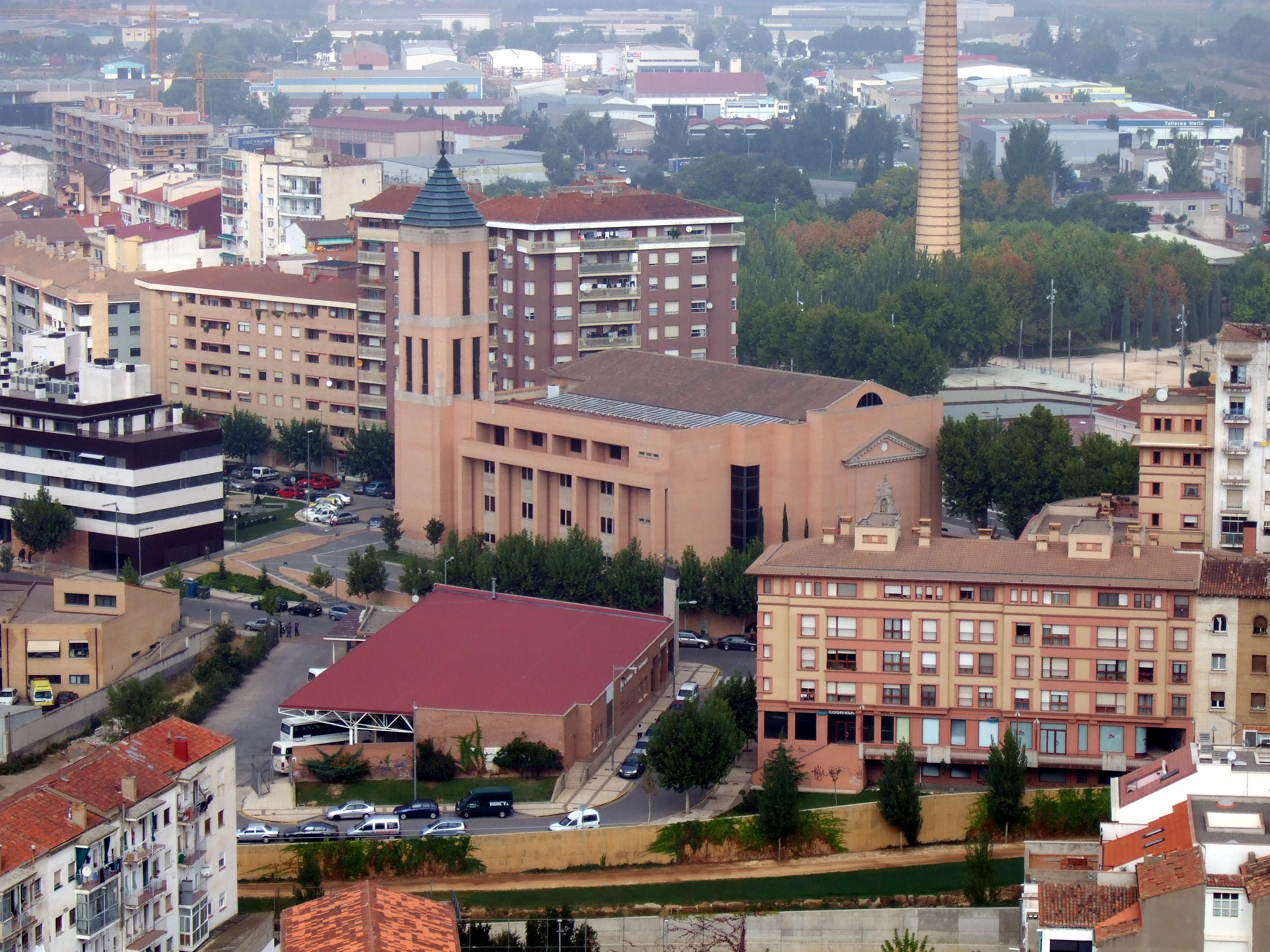
Conservatory Miguel Fleta

Music in Monzón is represented by the Grupo Folclórico de Nuestra Señora de la Alegría, the Municipal Band La Lira, the Coral Montisonense, and the Conservatory of Music Miguel Fleta. More recent ensembles include Ensemble XXI. In the field of rock music, several notable groups have emerged, particularly in the black metal genre, such as Ouija, Temple Abattoir, and Spellcraft.

Monzón also hosts a variety of cultural events and fairs, including the Aragonese Book Fair (FLA), book signings, and the Artery art fair. The town holds contests in painting and narrative, as well as various cultural gatherings. Local traditions include the feast of Saint Barbara, featuring the traditional Bautizo del Alcalde (Baptism of the Mayor), and festivities in honor of Saint Matthew during the week of September 21. Each year on Easter Monday, a pilgrimage takes place to the Ermita de la Alegría (Hermitage of the Virgin of Joy).

== Sport ==
=== Clubs ===
The local football club is Atlético Monzón.

=== Tournaments ===
Monzón hosts the annual women's tennis tournament, the Torneo Conchita Martínez, which is part of the ITF Women's Circuit.

=== Players and athletes ===
Monzón is the hometown of several notable athletes. Conchita Martínez, the first Spanish woman to win Wimbledon, was born here. Eliseo Martín, who won the bronze medal in the 3000 m steeplechase at the 2003 World Championships in Paris, is also from Monzón; he was the only non-African athlete to medal in that event since 1993.

The town has also produced Olympic athletes, including Javier Moracho (110 m hurdles), who held the Spanish record for nearly 20 years, the decathlete Álvaro Burrell, and pole vaulter Javier Gazol.

== Hydrology ==
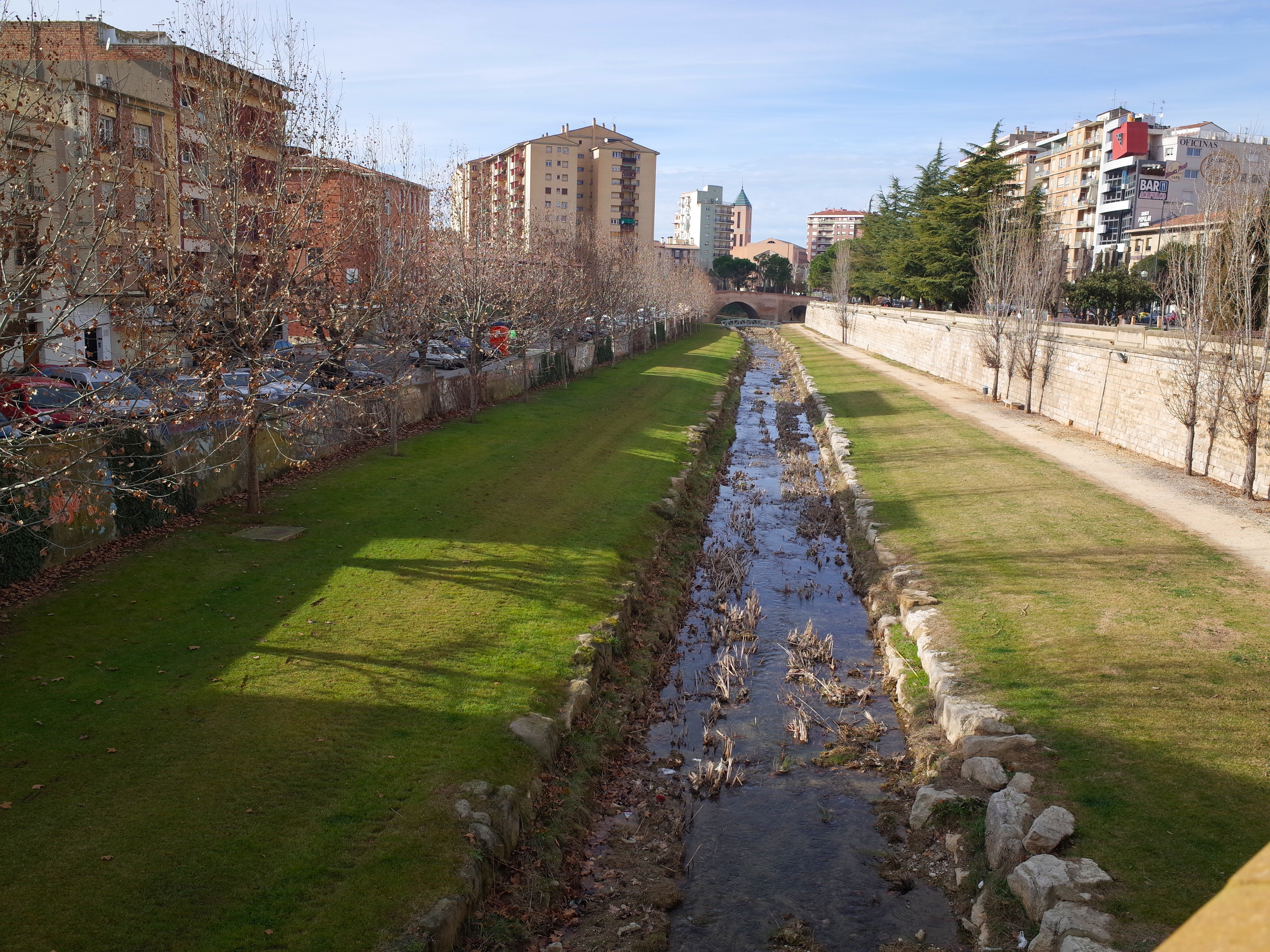
The River Sosa passing through Monzón

Monzón is crossed by the rivers Sosa and Cinca. The Cinca is the more significant of the two, with a higher environmental flow due to snowmelt in its headwaters. Although the Sosa has a much smaller flow, it is notable for the engineering work known as the Siphon of the Sosa, a viaduct carrying the Aragon and Catalonia Canal over the river. The canal was inaugurated in the early 20th century by King Alfonso XIII to extend irrigation to the eastern part of the province.

The Aragon and Catalonia Canal has made Monzón one of the leading agricultural and industrial centres in the region.

== Places of interest ==
- Castillo Templario (Castle of the Knights Templar)
- Catedral de Santa María del Romeral (Cathedral of Saint Mary of the Rosemary Field; 12th–13th centuries)
- Convento de San Francisco (Convent of Saint Francis; now dedicated to musical education and serving as the headquarters of the orchestral group Ensemble XXI)
- Ermita de la Virgen de la Alegría (Shrine of the Virgin of Joy; 17th century)
- Casa Mayor (Major House; 16th–17th centuries)
- Puerta de Luzán (Luzán Gate)

== Notable people from Monzón ==
- Ramiro Sánchez of Monzón (1070–1116), Lord of Monzón and Logroño, and father of García Ramírez of Navarre.
- John of Montson (c. 1340–1412), Dominican theologian and controversialist.
- Elijah ben Joseph Habillo, philosopher and translator.
- Ignacio de Luzán (1702–1754), poet and literary critic, whose works are studied internationally.
- Reverend Vicente Pilzano y Ezquerra (d. before the 18th century), chronicler of the city.
- José Mor de Fuentes (1762–1848), naval engineer and writer, author of works including La Serafina, La fonda de París, El calavera, A la muerte de Lord Byron, and Los nuevos desengaños.
- Joaquín Costa y Martínez (1846–1911), intellectual and leading figure of Regeneracionismo. He developed influential theories on education, water management, and agricultural policy. His notable works include Oligarquía y Caciquismo.
- Mariano de Pano y Ruata (1847–1948), president of the Ateneo and Academia de Bellas Artes de San Luis, official chronicler of the Monasterio de Sijena and of the Real Academia de la Historia. His works include Las coplas del Peregrino, Puey de Monzón, Viaje a la Meca en el siglo XVI, and La condesa de Bureta doña Consolidación de Azlor.
- Joaquín de Pano y Ruata (1849–1919), engineer, ornithologist, philologist, and translator of several languages including Chinese and Japanese. He designed bridges in Monzón, one of which served as a model for bridges in Zaragoza.
- Barón de Eroles (1860–1941), lawyer and philanthropist who introduced one of the first X-ray machines in Spain to Monzón.
- Javier Moracho (born 1957), retired hurdler, gold medallist at the 1986 European Indoor Championships and silver medallist at the 1985 World Indoor Games.
- José Luis Mumbiela Sierra (born 1969), Roman Catholic clergyman and Bishop of the Holy Trinity Diocese in Almaty.
- Conchita Martínez (born 1972), former tennis player and winner of Wimbledon in 1994.
- Eliseo Martín (born 1973), long-distance runner specialising in the 3000 metres steeplechase.

== Twin towns ==
- Barcelona, Spain
- Muret, France

== See also ==
- List of municipalities in Huesca
