= Liza del Sierra =

French pornographic actress (born 1985)

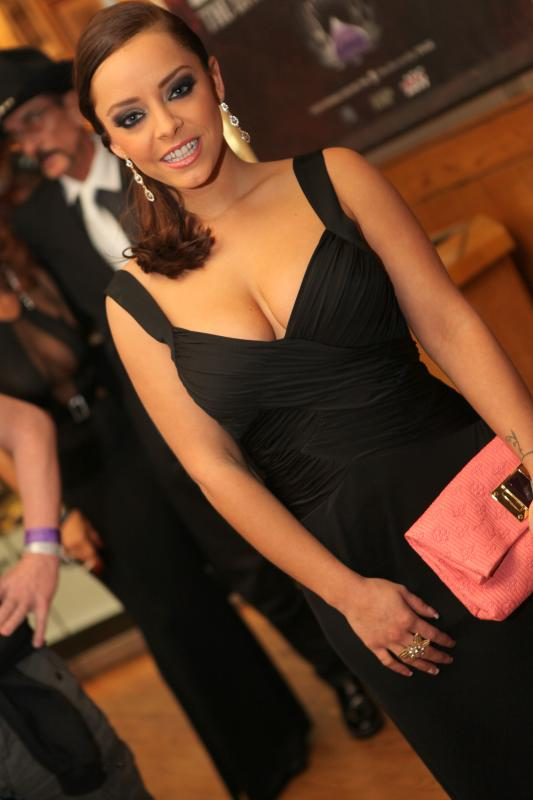
- del Sierra at the 2012 AVN Awards
- Born: Émilie Delaunay; 30 August 1985 (age 41); Pontoise, Val-d'Oise, France
- Other names: Liza, Liza D. Sierra, Lisa Del Sierra, Lysa Del Sierra, Del Sierra
- Height: 5 ft 4 in (1.63 m)
- Website: www.clubliza.fr

Liza del Sierra (also spelled Del Sierra, born 30 August 1985) is a French pornographic actress, film director and producer (adult films).

== Biography ==
Del Sierra was born Émilie Delaunay in Pontoise, in the Parisian region. She later grew up mostly in Bordeaux. After working as a stripper, she shot her first pornographic film in 2005, with her husband's approval. They later divorced.

After making several films in France, she worked for a time in Hungary's porn industry. She also stated in a 2012 interview that she had escorted for some time when she wasn't getting enough film offers.

In 2009, she received a career achievement award at the Brussels International Festival of Eroticism. In 2010, she appeared in one episode of the series Du hard ou du cochon !, the French remake of PG Porn, broadcast on Canal+. After shooting a gonzo in France with Manuel Ferrara, she went to work in the United States, where she received several AVN Awards nominations. On July 11, 2011, Complex ranked her eightieth on their list of "The Top 100 Hottest Porn Stars (Right Now)". Her American career helped her to achieve more fame in her home country, where she became familiar to the general public in the early 2010s. After returning to France, she started directing and producing. In 2014, the production of one of her films as a director was the subject of a documentary about the porn industry, broadcast on France 2.

== Awards and nominations ==
Year	Ceremony	Category	Nominee(s)	Result
2009	Brussels International Festival of Eroticism	Career achievement award		Won
2012	AVN	Best Double-Penetration Scene	Evil Anal 14 (shared with Mick Blue and Toni Ribas)	Nominated
2012	AVN	Best Group Sex Scene	Orgy: The XXX Championship (shared with Kaci Starr, Marie McCray, Aiden Ashley, Alan Stafford, Anthony Rosano, Asa Akira, Austin Matthews, Charlie Theron, Diana Doll, Evan Stone, Jaelyn Fox, Jeanie Marie, Ramón Nomar, Raven Alexis, Sean Michaels, Sophia Lomeli, Xander Corvus and Yuki Mori)	Nominated
2012	AVN	Best POV Sex Scene	Anal Workout (shared with Mick Blue)	Nominated
2012	AVN	Female Foreign Performer of the Year		Nominated
2013	XBIZ	Foreign Female Performer of the Year		Nominated
