= Lycée Camille Pissarro =

Senior high school in Pontoise, Val-d'Oise, Paris, France

Lycée Camille Pissarro is a senior high school/sixth-form college in Pontoise, Val-d'Oise, France, in the Paris metropolitan area.

Planning for the school began in 1953 and it was first established in 1959.
