= Mivchar Hapeninim =

1484 book on ethics by Shlomo ben Yehudah

Mukhtar al-Jawahir (Arabic: مختار الجواهر), Mivchar HaPeninim (Hebrew: מבחר הפנינים. lit. "The Choice of Pearls"), an ethics work of sixty-four chapters. It has been attributed to be written by Rabbi Shlomo ben Yehudah since the 19th century, but this is doubtful.

== History ==
It was originally published, along with a short commentary, in Soncino, Italy, in 1484, and has since been re-worked and re-published in many forms and abridged editions (e.g. Joseph Ḳimcḥi versified the work under the title "Shekel ha-Kodesh").

== Description ==
The work is a collection of maxims, proverbs, and moral reflections, many of them of Arabic origin, and bears a strong similarity to the Florilegium of Hunayn ibn Ishaq and other Arabic and Hebrew collections of ethics sayings, which were highly prized by both Arabs and Jews.
