= Azharot =

Azharot (Hebrew: אזהרות, "exhortations") are didactic liturgical poems on, or versifications of, the 613 commandments in rabbinical enumeration. The first known example are Ata hinchlata and Azharat Reishit, recited to this day in some Ashkenazic and Italian communities, and dating back to early Geonic times. Other versions appear in the 10th century Siddur of Saadia Gaon, as well as by two Spanish authors of the Middle Ages: Isaac ben Reuben Albargeloni and Solomon ibn Gabirol and the French author Elijah ben Menahem HaZaken.

== Etymology ==
The name of the poetical form derives from the first word of one of its earliest examples, Hebrew: אזהרות ראשית לעמך נתת. Two attempts to ascribe special meaning to that choice of term have been suggested:

1. Chazal sometimes refer to biblical prohibitions as azharot.
2. The numerological sum of a condensed form of the word (אזהרת, instead of אזהרות) equals the number of commandments

== Liturgical customs ==
In the Ashkenazic and Italian rites, Azharot are recited in the mussaf service. This was the Sephardic practice in the Middle Ages as well, but due to Halakhic concerns they were moved to other places in the liturgy. As such, most Sephardic communities have moved them to the mincha or arvit service, or to the Sabbath prior to Shavuot. Some Sephardic diaspora communities chant the Positive Commandments of the azharot on the first day of Shavuot, and the Negative Commandments on the second day. Sephardic/Eastern communities recite the azharot of Ibn Gebirol, while North African communities of Morocco, Algeria, Tunisia, and Libya may recite (either instead of or addition to Ibn Gebirol) the azharot of Barceloni.

== Poems ==
- Hebrew: אזהרות ראשית לעמך נתת
  - Recited during Musaf of the second day of Shavuot in the Ashkenazic rite, and on the first day in the Italian rite.
- Hebrew: אתה הנחלת תורה לעמך
  - Referred to variously as "Azharot of the Rabbis of the Academy" or "Azharot of Elijah or Azharot Elijah the Tishbite". Its authorship is disputed, but its origin seems to have been in the academies of Pumbedita.
    - Recited during Musaf of the first day of Shavuot in the Ashkenazic rite, and in an abbreviated form on the second day in the Italian rite.
- Hebrew: אנכי אש אכלה
  - Written by Saadia Gaon
- Hebrew: אחגור חיל לרומם הבורא (lit. "I will gird me with strength to extol the Creator")
  - According to Isaac b. Todros, to be found in the siddur of Amram Gaon, but scholarship suggests possibly actually written by Isaac Gikatilla.
- Hebrew: אוכלה אלקיך אש
  - By Ibn Gabirol (edited by Sachs-Halberstamm, "Ḳobeẓ 'al-Yad," 1893)
- Hebrew: איזה מקום בינה (lit. "Where is the abode of understanding?")
  - By Isaac b. Reuben Albargeloni
- Hebrew: אמת יהגה חכי (lit. "Truth shall my mouth indite")
  - By Elijah ha-Zaḳen b. Menahem of Mans, first published by Luzzatto in "Literaturblatt des Orients," 1850, part 16
- Hebrew: ריש לדברות אנכי
  - By Eliezer b. Nathan, for the evening service of the second day of Shavuot
- Hebrew: אני בינה שוכנת אמונה (lit. "I, Understanding, dwell on high")
  - By Isaac Petit b. Mordecai Kimḥi
- Hebrew: ארוממך ה' מלכי (lit. "I will extol Thee, O Lord, my King")
  - By Krespia ha-Naḳdan
- Hebrew: אברך לא-ל נורא (lit. "I will bless the God Tremendous")
  - By Elijah ha-Kohen Tchelebi
- "Pour forth Thy mercy"
  - Written by Menahem Tamar
- Hebrew: מה' מאוד נעלה אשאלה - Menahem Egozi
- Hebrew: אדנ-י בם
  - By Elijah Adeni (of Aden) (Amsterdam ed., 1688)
  - By Joshua Benveniste
  - By Joseph b. Solomon Yaḥya

== Reception ==
=== Criticisms ===
Abraham ibn Ezra (Yesod Moreh, gate 2, end) compared azharot to counting medicinal herbs enumerated in medical works without knowing anything of their virtues. Maimonides claims in the introduction to Sefer HaMitzvot, his own prose enumeration of the commandments, that he was motivated to compose that work because of errors in the azharot. Deference to Maimonides' criticism led major rabbis (18th-century Chaim Yosef David Azulai; 20th-century Rabbi Ovadia Yosef ) to prefer reading Maimonides' prose list to the poetic azharot. In 1971, Rabbi Yosef Qafih composed azharot based upon Maimonides' list.

=== Commentaries ===
While the original intent of the azharot may have been educational, its terse and cryptic poetic form led to a need for its content to be explained. Commentaries include:

- Netiv Mitsvotekha (Livorno, 1841), by Rabbi Saul ibn Musa ha-Kohen of Jerba (1772–1848)
- "Mahzor Shelom Yerushalayim for Shavuot" (New York, 1994) by Rabbi Shimon Hai Alouf and Rabbi Ezra Labaton (pages 279–287).
- Rabbi David Bitton (1979) on Ibn Gabirol's Azharot (Missvot 'Aseh)
- Yonah Frankel, Shavuot Machzor, pages 615–651

== See also ==
- Piyyut
- Pizmonim
