= Monzón Castle =

Spanish fortress

Coordinates: 41.9091°N 0.191633°E

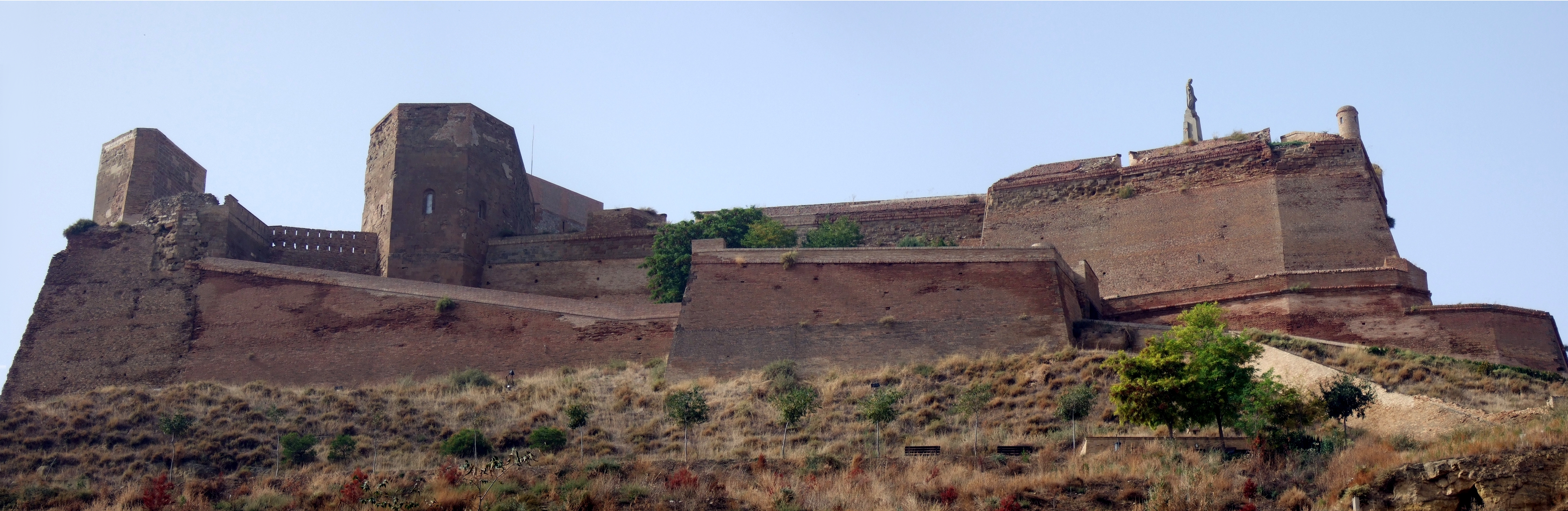
View of the castle.

Monzón Castle is a fortress located in Monzón, Spain.

Built during the tenth century under Muslim rule, Aragonese forces captured the castle in 1089 when it was conquered by Sancho Ramírez. In 1143 the castle passed to the Templars who added walls, towers, stables, a dining hall and dormitories. King James I of Aragon lived in the fort under Templar protection during his childhood.

In 1309, at the time of the dissolution of the Templars, the castle was besieged and captured by the army of James II of Aragon. The fort continued to maintain garrisons until the nineteenth century which led to the logical evolution in their walls and defenses, and their appearance today reflects their eighteenth century configuration. Monzón Castle is today partially restored and is designated as a National Monument.

== See also ==
- Castle of Montearagón
