= Hôtel de Ville, Pontoise =

Town hall in Pontoise, France

Hôtel de Ville
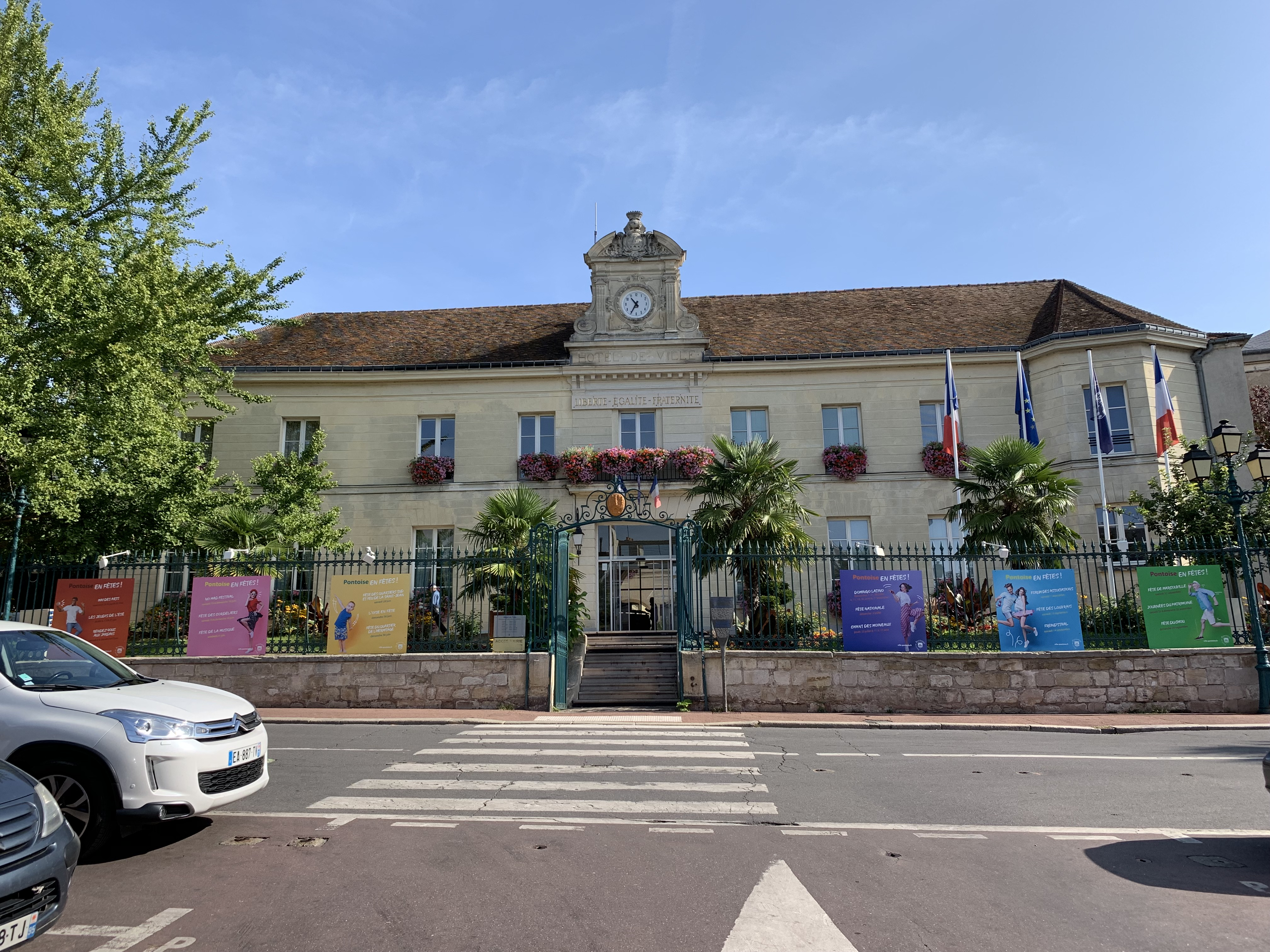
- The main frontage of the Hôtel de Ville in August 2019
- Interactive map of the Hôtel de Ville area

General information
- Type: City hall
- Architectural style: Neoclassical style
- Location: Pontoise, France
- Coordinates: 49.0509°N 2.1008°E
- Completed: 1860

The Hôtel de Ville (French pronunciation: [otɛl də vil], City Hall) is a municipal building in Pontoise, Val-d'Oise, to the northwest of Paris, standing on Place de l'Hôtel-de-Ville.

== History ==
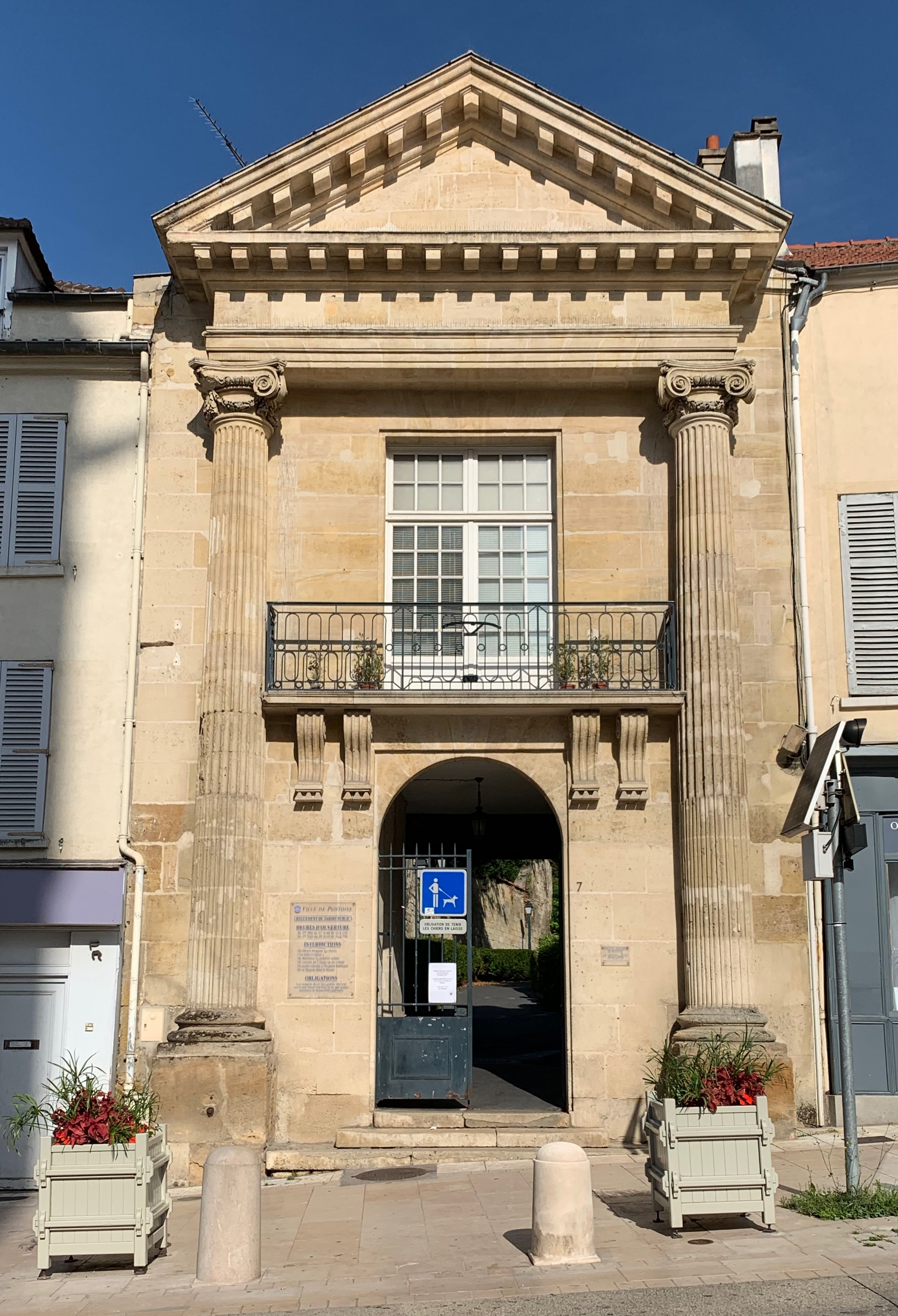
The old town hall

The first town hall in Pontoise, on Place du Petit-Martroy, was paid for by Louis François Joseph, Prince of Conti. It was designed in the neoclassical style, built in ashlar stone and was completed in around 1779. It featured a full height portico formed by a pair of Ionic order columns supporting a cornice, an entablature and a modillioned pediment. There was a round headed opening on the ground floor, providing access to the garden behind, and a French door with a balcony on the first floor.

In the mid-19th century, the town council led by the mayor, Jean-Baptiste-Charles Tavernier, decided to acquire a more substantial building. The property they selected, on what is now Place de l'Hôtel-de-Ville, was the Couvent des Cordeliers (Convent of the Cordeliers). The convent was founded outside the town walls by Blanche of Castile in 1233. In order to establish greater protection against foreign attack, the convent was relocated to its current site in 1360. A church was erected on the new site and consecrated in 1485. The monks who lived there included the 16th century historian, Noël Taillepied, whose works included "Psichologie, ou Traité de l'apparition des esprits" (Physiology, or Treatise on the Appearance of Ghosts), published in 1588.

The influential Parlement of Paris was exiled to the convent in Pontoise on three separate occasions. In 1652, during the Fronde, King Louis XIV ordered an increase in taxes to fund the Franco-Spanish War: when the Parlement objected, he sent them to the convent. Then in 1720, the Prince Regent ordered the restructuring of John Law's Company which was in financial difficulties: when the Parlement objected, he sent them to the convent again. Finally, in 1753, after some clergy members refused the sacraments to Jansenists, the Parlement started hearing appeals. King Louis XV objected and sent them to the convent once more.

After the convent was confiscated by the state as biens nationaux (for the good of the state), the monks were driven out, and it was acquired by the council in 1854. The convent was then demolished in the late 1850s, and a new municipal building was erected on the site. It was designed in the neoclassical style, built in ashlar stone and completed around 1860.

The design involved an asymmetrical main frontage of nine bays facing onto the square. The central bay featured a square headed doorway and there was a French door with a balcony on the first floor. The other bays were fenestrated with casement windows on both floors. The right-hand bay projected to form an octagonal shape on both floors. Internally, the principal room was the Salle du Conseil (council chamber). In 1886, the building was enhanced by a new decoration above the central bay: designed by Louis-Hippolyte Lebas, it consisted of a clock, flanked by pilasters supporting a segmental pediment, with a coat of arms in the tympanum.

After the liberation of the town by American troops on 30 August 1944, during the Second World War, celebrations took place in the square in front of the town hall. A plaque inscribed with the words "Liberty, Equality, Fraternity" was installed on the front of the building, below the clock, in 1998.
