= Elijah ben Menahem HaZaken =

11th-century French Tosafist

Elijah ben Menahem the Elder (Hebrew: אליהו בן מנחם הזקן; c. 980 - 1060 ), also known as Rabbeinu Eliyahu HaZaken, was an 11th-century French Tosafist and liturgical poet.

Born around 980 in France, in his early years he went to Germany, where he became a pupil of Gershom ben Judah. He later returned to France, settling in Le Mans, and allegedly married the daughter of Sherira Gaon. Elijah wrote "Azharot", a poem on the 613 commandments, containing 176 four-line strophes. The poem was known to the Tosafists and is quoted in several places Elijah also wrote "Seder HaMa'arakah", a collection of Biblical passages arranged for recitation on each day of the week.
