= Ensemble XXI =

Ensemble XXI is a Spanish orchestral group consisting of classical guitars, bowed string and wind instruments, percussion and vocals, founded in 2000–2001 under the tutelage of its conductor José Antonio Chic. Headquartered in the Conservatory of Music "Miguel Fleta" of Monzón, Huesca, Spain.

== History ==
The group was born thanks to Jose Antonio Chic, guitar teacher of the Monzon Conservatory since 1992. Chic, these days, he taught the group lessons of guitar, instrument of faint sound that usually isn't part of the staff of the classical orchestra, and he needed to release to his pupils the feeling of making music with other instruments, to create beauty together working everybody in the same direction. That's the reason he added violin, flute, cello, viola, clarinet, trumpet, contrabass, percussion and voice getting many different colors to his little ensemble.

The setback came because there were no scores for this strange formation and only then comes the aspect of José Antonio as a composer and arranger. He created an absolutely original repertory which gave to his orchestra an own personality, and special identity sign because any orchestra in the world made this kind of music.

Since that time, Ensemble XXI has recorded six albums, it has performed more than 170 concerts and it has allocated all its resources to support young musical talents by organizing international courses with prestigious teachers as Hopkinson Smith, Andrew York, Oscar Ghiglia, Roland Dyens, Joaquín Clerch, Alejandro Garrido, Ricardo Gallén, Jaime Martín, Júlia Gállego, Ane Matxain, which have benefited over 700 students from all over Spain, France, Italy and Japan.

To celebrate its 10th anniversary, it was holding a series of concerts in which they participated as guests, distinguished personalities such as Hopkinson Smith, Gemma Romanyà (CAT), Dimitri Psonis, Fernando Argenta (SP), Miguel Ángel Angulo, Ane Matxain, Emilio Ferrando and Vicente Alamá.

=== Staff ===
Currently the staff consists of over 30 young musicians trained in the Conservatory of Music "Miguel Fleta", including Maria Eugenia Boix, a young soprano who enjoyed the Fellowship "Montserrat Caballé, Bernabé Martí" Improvement of Song, among others. The members of the orchestra are chosen by their teachers of the instrument when it is down a final cycle of studies, that is why during his ten years of history have passed through its ranks some 80 musicians.

=== Sound and repertoire ===
Ensemble XXI's repertoire is unusual in the classical music circuit, including music and dances of the Renaissance, Celtic, Irish and Scottish ballads, and ethnic music and new trends. It is an innovative new combination concept between guitars and other instruments internationally recognized and appreciated for its high educational value.

=== Discography ===
- 2001 – Leyenda Irlandesa
- 2002 – Niebla
- 2004 – El bosque encantado
- 2006 – Retratos del Mar
- 2008 – Secretos de Papel
- 2010 – Postales de Verano

== Repercussion ==
Thanks to its international repercussions, it has served as a model for the development of similar musical ensembles in over 12 countries.

His music is part of the educational program of musical education, prestigious conservatories and universities in countries of great musical tradition as the United States, Canada, Belgium, France, Finland, Norway, Italy or Germany.

Recognized international music publications such as magazine Classical Guitar Magazine have written extensive reports as well as high-impact sites in the world of guitar.

== Awards and nominations ==
Award nomination for "Altoaragonés del año 2009"

== Guests ==
Soloists of prestigious orchestras as the Academy of Saint Martin in the Fields and the Mahler Chamber Orchestra, have been invited to work with Ensemble XXI on its International Music Course developed in the town of Peralta de la Sal, Huesca province, in Aragon; and on Master Classes held in the Conservatory of Music "Miguel Fleta" from Monzón. Both already have a significant impact in the music media.

=== Teachers of the International Music Course ===
- Flute:

Miguel Ángel Angulo
Mirta González

- Clarinet:

Emilio Ferrando
Carlos García
Ona Cardona

- Trumpet:

José Martínez Colomina
Ricardo Casañ
Ingrid Rebstock

- Violin:

Ane Matxain
Elena Albericio
Maite Larburu
Luis Carlos Badía

- Viola:

Alejandro Garrido
Vicente Alamá
Natasha Nikiforova

- Cello:

Juan Pérez de Albéniz

- Contrabass:

Luis Cojal

- Canto:

David Menéndez
Assumpta Mateu
María Eugenia Boix

- Guitar:

Oscar Ghiglia
José Antonio Chic
Letizia Guerra

=== Teachers of the Master Classes ===
- Guitar:

Oscar Ghiglia
Roland Dyens
Ricardo Gallén (SP)
Andrew York
Joaquín Clerch

- Flute:

Jaime Martín
Julia Gállego

- Violin:

Santiago Juan

- Percussion:

Dimitri Psonis

- Chamber music and conduction

Oscar Ghiglia
Juan Pérez de Albéniz
Joaquín Clerch
Ricardo Gallén (SP)
Andrew York
Jaime Martín
Julia Gállego
Roland Dyens
Hopkinson Smith
Francesc Llongueres
Abel Tomás
