= Menahem Egozi =

Menahem ben Moses Egozi (Hebrew: מנחם בן משה אגוזי) was a Turkish Talmudist, who lived in Constantinople in the sixteenth century. He was the author of Gal shel Egozim ('Garden of Nuts'), expositions on Genesis, published at Belvedere, near Constantinople. He also published 400 Geonic responsa in Constantinople in 1575.
