= Elijah ben Joseph Habillo =

15th-century Spanish Jewish philosopher and translator

Elijah ben Joseph Ḥabillo (Hebrew: אליהו בן יוסף חביליו), (Note: Also transliterated as Xabillo and Chabillo.) also known as Maestro Manoel, was a Spanish Jewish philosopher and translator active in Monzón, Aragon, in the second half of the fifteenth century.

Ḥabillo studied Latin with the purpose of translating into Hebrew works of Christian scholastic philosophers, particularly writings on psychology.

== Translations ==
Ḥabillo translated and adapted several works of Thomas Aquinas:

- Quaestiones Disputatae, Quaestio de Anima
- De Animae Facultatibus (Maʿamar be-Koḥot ha-Nefesh)
- De Universalibus
- Sheʾelot Maʿamar be-Nimtsa u-ve-Mahut, questions on Aquinas' treatise concerning being and quality

Ḥabillo also translated William of Ockham's Summa Totius Logices (with an added appendix) and Quaestiones Philosophicae, as well as Aristotle's De Causa, which contains thirty-two premises with explanations. According to Jellinek and Steinschneider, he was also responsible for an anonymous Hebrew translation of Vincent of Beauvais' De Universalibus, under the title Maʿamar Nikbad bi-Kelal.
